= New concept for development =

Chinese developmental philosophy

New concept for development or the new development philosophy (Chinese: 新发展理念; pinyin: Xīn Fāzhǎn Lǐniàn), also called the five major development concepts (Chinese: 五大发展理念; pinyin: Wǔdà fāzhǎn lǐniàn), is a political slogan promoted by the Chinese Communist Party (CCP). It was coined at the fifth plenary session of the 18th CCP Central Committee in 2015 to achieve the goals of the thirteenth five-year plan. The five concepts refers to development being innovative, coordinated, green, open, and shared.

== History ==
New Concept for Development was first mentioned at the fifth plenary session of the 18th CCP Central Committee in 2015 to achieve the goals of the 13th Five-Year Plan. In early 2016, General Secretary Xi Jinping described the new concept of development "as both the baton and the traffic lights" of the economic system. At the Central Economic Work Conference in 2017, it was announced that the concept formed the principal content of the Xi Jinping Thought on Economy. At the first session of the 13th National People's Congress on 11 March 2018, the preamble of the Constitution of China was amended to include the concept. At a seminar at the Central Party School in early 2021, Xi described the concept as "a systematic theoretical system that answered a series of theoretical and practical questions about the purpose, motivation, method and path of development, clarifying our party's political stance, value orientation, development model, and development path".

== Definition ==
The phrase aims to re-orient the Chinese economy to a new development pattern, and from a narrow focus on GDP growth targets towards high-quality development. It consists of five elements:

1. Innovation (创新) is the driving force for development.
2. Coordination (协调) is the inherent requirement for sustained and healthy development.
3. Green (绿色) is a necessary condition for sustainable development and reflects people's pursuit of a better life.
4. Openness (开放) is the only way for the country to prosper and develop.
5. Shared (共享) development is an essential requirement of socialism with Chinese characteristics.

== Conceptual basis ==
The new development concept holds that after 45 years of rapid growth, China's economy is very large but has distortions and inequalities that create social division and domestic economic risks. Accordingly, the new development concept states that China will deprioritize rapid growth and seek sustainable growth and common prosperity. In 2017, Xi said that through the new concept of development, China would move "to a model that is more advanced, better structured, and with a more complicated division of labor".

The new development concept holds that while China will not close its economy it must reduce its technological dependence on foreign countries and leverage its domestic market against foreign pressures.
