= Central Leading Group for Coordinated Regional Development =

Chinese Communist Party body

- 中央区域协调发展领导小组; Zhōngyāng Qūyù Xiétiáo Fāzhǎn Lǐngdǎo Xiǎozǔ
- Emblem of the Chinese Communist Party

Agency overview
- Formed: 2023; 3 years ago
- Type: Leading small group
- Jurisdiction: Chinese Communist Party
- Headquarters: Beijing
- Agency executive: Leader
- Parent agency: Central Committee of the Chinese Communist Party

Central Leading Group for Coordinated Regional Development
- Simplified Chinese: 中央区域协调发展领导小组
Transcriptions
Standard Mandarin
- Hanyu Pinyin: Zhōngyāng Qūyù Xiétiáo Fāzhǎn Lǐngdǎo Xiǎozǔ

The Central Leading Group for Social Governance is a coordination body set up under the Central Committee of the Chinese Communist Party responsible for a series of major regional coordinated development strategies in China, including the China Western Development, the Northeast Area Revitalization Plan, the Rise of Central China Plan, the priority development of the eastern region, the Coordinated Development of the Beijing-Tianjin-Hebei Region, the development of the Yangtze River Economic Belt, the construction of the Guangdong–Hong Kong–Macao Greater Bay Area, the Strategy for Integrated Development of the Yangtze River Delta, the comprehensive deepening of reform and opening up in Hainan, and the ecological protection and high-quality development of the Yellow River Basin.

== History ==
At the end of November 2018, the Central Committee of the Chinese Communist Party and the State Council issued the Opinions on Establishing a More Effective New Mechanism for Coordinated Regional Development. The Opinions said that the new mechanism for coordinated regional development should adhere to the combination of central coordination and local responsibility, strengthen the top-level design of the new mechanism for coordinated regional development by the central government, clarify the implementation responsibility of local governments, and fully mobilize the initiative and enthusiasm of local governments; adhere to the combination of differentiated treatment and fair competition, formulate differentiated policies for different regions, and pay more attention to regional integrated development, maintain fair competition in the national unified market, and prevent the creation of policy depressions and local protectionism. According to the plan, by 2035, the new mechanism for coordinated regional development would play an important role in significantly narrowing the regional development gap and achieving equalization of basic public services, relatively balanced infrastructure accessibility, and roughly equal basic living standards for the people. The "new mechanism for coordinated regional development" has been identified by many media outlets as being related to the Central Leading Group for Coordinated Regional Development.

On 5 September 2023, the State Council Information Office held a press conference on the relevant situation of the "Development Plan of Shenzhen Park of Hetao Shenzhen-Hong Kong Science and Technology Innovation Cooperation Zone". At the conference, the National Development and Reform Commission introduced the functions and working methods of the Central Leading Group for Regional Coordination and Development for the first time. At the same time, it was found that it had made several public appearances during the year: On 9 June 2023, the Jiangsu Provincial Department of Transportation and Jiangsu Transportation published an article entitled "Jiangsu actively integrates into the coordinated development pattern of the Yangtze River Delta region and promotes the high-quality development of transportation integration to be at the forefront of the country!", while on 21 July 2023, Xiong’an Release published an article entitled "Zhang Guohua and Gou Ping, Deputy Director of the State-owned Assets Supervision and Administration Commission of the State Council, held a working meeting" in which the leading group and the leading group office appeared respectively. The Outlook magazine article quoted Zhang Zhanbin, Dean of the School of Marxism of the Central Party School, on the view of regional coordinated development, which was considered to be related to the leading group.

Guo Lanfeng, a member of the Party Group of the National Development and Reform Commission and a member of the Leading Group Office, introduced at the press conference that since the 18th CCP National Congress in 2012, General Secretary Xi Jinping has personally planned, deployed and promoted a series of major regional strategies, including the Coordinated Development of the Beijing-Tianjin-Hebei Region, the Strategy for Integrated Development of the Yangtze River Delta, the Yangtze River Economic Belt, the ecological protection and high-quality development of the Yellow River Basin, the construction of the Guangdong–Hong Kong–Macao Greater Bay Area, and the Hainan Free Trade Port. He said that after the 20th CCP National Congress, the CCP Central Committee decided to merge these major strategic leading groups into the Central Leading Group for Regional Coordination and Development for unified management. He said that his personal understanding is that the Party's leadership over all work should be institutionalized and concretized in terms of regional economic development, which means planning these major regional strategies from a higher level, from a strategic and overall perspective, and systematically coordinating the major policies among various strategies.

== Role ==
The Central Leading Group for Coordinated Regional Development studies the major deployments, major plans, important policies, key projects and annual work arrangements related to the major strategies for coordinated regional development, coordinate and resolve important issues, and urge the implementation of major matters. For major issues involving the Guangdong-Hong Kong-Macao Greater Bay Area, the chief executives of the Hong Kong and Macau are specially invited to participate. At the same time, under the leadership group, the CCP can also establish special task forces or inter-ministerial joint meeting mechanisms based on major matters and major tasks to specifically promote a certain task, that is, to coordinate and promote this matter for a certain period of time.

== Office ==
The Office of the Central Leading Group for Coordinated Regional Development is the working body of the Central Leading Group for Coordinated Regional Development. It is located within the National Development and Reform Commission, and its daily work is undertaken by the Department of Coordinated Regional Development.

=== History ===
Before the 2023 reform, the Office of the Leading Group for the Coordinated Development of Beijing-Tianjin- Hebei, the Office of the Leading Group for the Development of the Western Region of the State Council, the Office of the Leading Group for the Construction of the Guangdong-Hong Kong-Macao Greater Bay Area, and the Office of the Leading Group for Promoting the Comprehensive Deepening of Reform and Opening Up in Hainan were located in the National Development and Reform Commission, and their daily work was undertaken by the Regional Economy Department of the National Development and Reform Commission. The Regional Economy Department of the National Development and Reform Commission also had the nameplate of the Office for Promoting the Rise of the Central Region.

After the 20th CCP National Congress, the CCP Central Committee decided to merge these major strategic leading groups into the "Central Leading Group for Coordinated Regional Development" for unified management. The office of the Central Leading Group for Coordinated Regional Development is located in the National Development and Reform Commission, and its daily work is undertaken by the Department of Coordinated Regional Development.
