= Yangtze River Economic Belt =

Coordinates: 30°N 110°E

Yangtze River Economic Belt 长江经济带发展规划纲要
- Region
- Subdivisions of China within the YREB
- Provinces: Anhui, Guizhou, Hubei, Hunan, Jiangsu, Jiangxi, Sichuan, Yunnan, Zhejiang
- Direct-administered municipalities: Chongqing, Shanghai
- Established: 2016

Population
  - Total: 606,000,000

The Yangtze River Economic Belt (YREB) is a region along the Yangtze River. The idea was introduced in 2014 and established in 2016, with the Chinese government aiming to increase economic growth with minimal environmental damage. Around 21% of the area of China and 40% of its population lies within the belt. Eleven province-level divisions of China are included in the YREB: Anhui, Chongqing, Guizhou, Hubei, Hunan, Jiangsu, Jiangxi, Shanghai, Sichuan, Yunnan, and Zhejiang.

== Geography ==
The YREB is made up of nine provinces and two direct-administered municipalities. Around 21% of China's area lies in the belt. Poyang Lake, located within Jiangxi, is the largest freshwater lake of China and is within the YREB.

== Economy ==
In 2021, the YREB consisted of 46% of the national GPD. Between 2016 and 2021, the YREB region saw a direct increase in economic development as a result of the plan.

As of 2020, the YREB saw an average yearly increase of 9.6% in the population of nurses per year. Growth in the nursing population was the largest in the upper regions. In 2023, the tourism industry made up 23% of the YREB's GDP.

Of cities that significantly reduced wastewater within the YREB, none saw economic regression.

== Ecological impact ==
In 2021, air pollutants were more common in the YREB than the rest of China. The Yangtze River Economic Belt plan reduced wastewater production in the Chongqing metropolitan area by 12% per year and insignificant reductions in the Yangtze Delta. Throughout the twelfth and thirteenth five-year plans, the YREB managed to eco-economically decouple itself significantly. The Asian Development Bank noted that a lack of institutional integration of ecological policy likely weakened the effects that the YREB plan had on Jiangxi.
