= Five‑Year Plan (Hong Kong) =

Hong Kong multi-year plan

The Five-Year Plan (Chinese: 香港五年規則), officially the Five-Year Plan for Economic and Social Development of the Hong Kong Special Administrative Region (Chinese: 香港特別行政區經濟和社會發展五年規劃), is the first multi-year plan for Hong Kong proposed by the Government of Hong Kong in 2026. The goal is to better align with the five-year plans of China while keeping a free-market economy, and improve social well-being.

== History ==
On February 4, 2026, Hong Kong Chief Executive John Lee Ka-chiu stated that the government would proactively align with the national 15th Five-Year Plan and formulate Hong Kong's first Five-Year Plan to integrate into and serve the overall national development strategy.

A two-month public consultation on the formulation of the First Five-Year Plan for Economic and Social Development of the Hong Kong Special Administrative Region (2026 - 2030) was first launched on June 15, 2026. The goal was to better align with the nation's 15th Five-Year Plan while keeping a free-market economy.

On September 16, 2026, Chief Executive John Lee Ka-chiu officially announced the first five-year plan at the Legislative Council of Hong Kong, with the purpose of improving citizens' life, enhancing the city's position as a world financial center as well as integrating with the national 15th Five-Year Plan of China.

== First five-year plan ==
The plan aligns with the National 15th Five-Year Plan and sets the five-year strategy for Hong Kong's development (2026-2030).

There are five major goals, including: more breakthroughs for economic development, stronger global competitiveness and influence, faster and more effective development of the Northern Metropolis, substantial improvement of social well-being, and further integration into the national development.

There are six major measures, including:

- Enhancing and developing Hong Kong's roles of international financial center, maritime center and aviation hub, trade center, and innovation and technology center, as well as an international hub for top talents.
- Taking advantages of Hong Kong's role as an international city to strengthen its global competitiveness.
- Strengthening the development of the Guangdong-Hong Kong-Macao Greater Bay Area.
- Speeding up development of the Northern Metropolis.
- Improving social well-being and protection.
- Employing an effective holistic approach to development.

There are other aspects that the government is focusing on too, including AI development and application.

The government will regularly assess and evaluate the implementation of the five-year plan, and make adjustments based on actual circumstances.

== Public response ==
The public reaction varies:

1. Some pro-government people and business leaders support the plan and view it as favorable for the development of the economy of Hong Kong.
2. Many residents are concerned about the consistency of the region's market and civil freedom.
3. Active groups warned that it may lead to more restriction of free expression.

== See also ==
- Policy Address
- Five-year plans of China
- 15th Five-Year Plan
- Xi Jinping Thought on Economy
