= New Infrastructure =

New Infrastructure Creation (Chinese: 新型基础设施建设 or 新基建) is an economic development concept created in 2018 during Central Economic Work Conference emphasizing the need for creation of new infrastructure based on hi-tech (e.g. 5G) infrastructure, as opposed to traditional Infrastructure-based development.
