= 15th Five-Year Plan =

Chinese economic development plan (2026–2030)

China
- 15th Five-Year Plan
- Full name: 15th Five-Year Plan for Economic and Social Development of the People's Republic of China
- Start date: 2025
- End date: 2030

Economic targets
- GDP at start: CN¥140.188 trillion
- The original text of the plan, hosted on Wikisource: 15th Five-Year Plan
← 14th

15th Five-Year Plan
- Simplified Chinese: 十五五规划
- Traditional Chinese: 十五五規劃
Transcriptions
Standard Mandarin
- Hanyu Pinyin: Shíwǔwǔ Guīhuà

15th Five-Year Plan for Economic and Social Development and Long-range Objectives Through the Year 2030 of the People's Republic of China
- Simplified Chinese: 中华人民共和国国民经济和社会发展第十五个五年规划纲要
- Traditional Chinese: 中華人民共和國國民經濟和社會發展第十五個五年規劃綱要
Transcriptions
Standard Mandarin
- Hanyu Pinyin: Zhōnghuá Rénmín Gònghéguó Guómín Jīngjì hé Shèhuì Fāzhǎndì Shíwǔgè Wǔnián Guīhuà Gāngyào Hé

The 15th Five-Year Plan, officially the 15th Five-Year Plan for Economic and Social Development of the People's Republic of China, is a set of goals for national economic development. The plan, abbreviated 15-5, covers the years from 2026 to 2030.

== Drafting ==
A preliminary study for the plan by the National Development and Reform Commission took place on 17 and 18 December 2023. According to Arthur Kroeber, speeches before drafting the new plan emphasized new quality productive forces, disruptive innovation, and a new national system for coordination.

The fourth plenary session of the 20th Central Committee of the Chinese Communist Party, held on 20 to 23 October 2025, focused on assessing the previous 14th Five-Year Plan and considered the proposed 15th five-year plan. On 24 October 2025, Premier Li Qiang chaired a special meeting on the preparation of the outline of the 15th Five-Year plan, with Vice Premier Ding Xuexiang being present. On 3 November 2025, CCP General Office Director Cai Qi published an opinion piece in the People's Daily, where he stressed the "extreme importance of exercising full and rigorous party self-governance to achieve the economic and social development goals of the 15th five-year plan period".

On 27 February 2026, the CCP Politburo held a meeting to discuss the draft outline of the plan, which the State Council intended to submit to the fourth session of the 14th National People's Congress for review. The National People's Congress subsequently reviewed the draft outline. It was approved by the NPC on 12 March 2026.

== Details ==
The plan seeks to achieve basic socialist modernization. It has six main principles "upholding the party's overall leadership; putting people first; ensuring high quality development; upholding comprehensive and in-depth reform; implementing state market balance to form an economic order that is 'flexible' and 'well managed'; and balancing security and development." This means pursuing high-quality development over pure growth. This development can be measured through labor and capital productivity. For the period, 4.5-5% gross domestic product growth is expected. Compared to the 14th Five-Year Plan, the 15-5 puts more emphasis on supporting businesses and less on supporting an equal distribution of wealth.

15-5 highlights a need to secure the critical supply chains for products with both civil and military applications. The central committee has stated that China must "maintain a reasonable proportion of manufacturing" and support "optimizing and upgrading traditional industries". General Secretary of the Chinese Communist Party Xi Jinping stated, "real economy cannot be lost". These statements indicate that China's future economic planning will not disregard the manufacturing sector.

The 70 percent semiconductor self-sufficiency target established under Made in China 2025, a target China missed by roughly 50 points, has been quietly deleted from the 15th Five-Year Plan and replaced with a deployment metric: digital economy value-added at 12.5 percent of GDP by 2030. Beijing is no longer measuring success by how many chips it produces. It is measuring success by how deeply computing infrastructure penetrates the economy.

Green technologies such as solar power and electric vehicles, and the accompanying rare-earth supply chains have been successful in China. In 15–5, Beijing aims to support similar policies for advanced semiconductors, biotechnology, and quantum technology.

Other efforts focus on improving China's financial strength. Reforms intended to achieve this goal include "advancing the Chinese currency's internationalization, pursuing greater openness of the capital account, and building a homegrown, risk-controllable cross-border renminbi payment system." The plan encourages adoption of more flexible regulations.

Another aspect of the 15-5 is an emphasis on improving social support systems for vulnerable groups, including people with disabilities. One example of this initiative is the opening of a "silent café" that employs deaf workers inside a government office in Huai'an.

=== Key indicators ===
The following targets were set under the plan:

Key indicators of economic and social development during the 15th Five-Year Plan period
Category	Index	Attributive	2025 Baseline	2030 Goal
Economic development	GDP growth	Indicative	—	Maintain in a reasonable range
Economic development	Labor productivity growth	Indicative	—	Higher than GDP growth
Economic development	Urbanization rate of permanent residents (%)	Indicative	67.9	71
Innovation	Average annual R&D expenditure growth (%)	Indicative	—	7.1
Innovation	High-value innovation patents per 10,000 people	Indicative	15.3	>22
Innovation	Share of value added of core digital economy industries in GDP (%)	Indicative	10.2	12.5
People's livelihood and welfare	Surveyed urban unemployment rate (%)	Indicative	5.2	<5.5
People's livelihood and welfare	Growth of per capita disposable income (%)	Indicative	—	In line with GDP growth
People's livelihood and welfare	Average years of schooling of working-age population	Binding	11.3	11.7
People's livelihood and welfare	Licensed physicians per 1,000 people	Indicative	3.2	3.7
People's livelihood and welfare	Registered nurses per 1,000 people	Indicative	3.9	5.1
People's livelihood and welfare	Share of nursing-type beds in elderly care institutions (%)	Indicative	62	73
People's livelihood and welfare	Increase in childcare enrolment rate for children under 3	Indicative	—	+6%
People's livelihood and welfare	Life expectancy	Indicative	78.6	80
Green ecology	Reduction in CO2 emissions per unit of GDP	Binding	—	-17%
Green ecology	Share of non-fossil energy in total energy consumption (%)	Binding	20.8	25
Green ecology	PM2.5 concentration in prefecture-level and above cities (pg/m3)	Binding	29.8	<27
Green ecology	Share of surface water reaching Grade III or above (%)	Binding	83	85
Green ecology	Forest coverage rate (%)	Binding	24.1	25.8
Security	Comprehensive grain production capacity (million jin)	Binding	1.39	>1.45
Security	Total energy production capacity (billion tons of standard coal)	Binding	4.8	5.8

== See also ==
- Five-year plans of China
- China Shock 2.0
- Five‑Year Plan (Hong Kong)

Preceded by 14th Plan; 2021 – 2025	15th Five-Year Plan; 2026–2030	Succeeded by 16th Plan; 2031–2035
