= Xiang Songzuo =

Chinese academic and economist

- 向松祚
- Born: Hubei, China

Xiang Songzuo (Chinese: 向松祚; pinyin: Xiàng Sōngzuò; born 1965) is a Chinese academic and economist. Currently, he is a professor at the Renmin University School of Finance and previously worked as a chief economist at the Agricultural Bank of China, and as a deputy director at the People's Bank of China.

== Background ==
Xiang was born in Zigui County, Hubei. He earned his Bachelors in Mechanical Engineering at Huazhong University in 1986, a Masters and Ph.D. in economics from Renmin University in 1993, and a Masters in International Affairs in 1999 at Columbia University, where he studied under Robert Mundell, a prominent promoter of supply-side economics. He is currently Deputy Director and Senior Fellow of the Center for International Monetary Research at Renmin University, a member of the advisory board of the Official Monetary and Financial Institutions Forum, and a special researcher at the Minsheng Research Institute of China. He is also a fellow at the Johns Hopkins University Institute for Applied Economics, Global Health, and the Study of Business Enterprise.

== Research ==
As an academic economist, he specializes in liquidity, floating exchange rates, and monetary economics.

On December 16, 2018, Xiang gave a lecture in Shanghai, which critiqued economic policy under CCP general secretary Xi Jinping and cited an unnamed report from an official institute, claiming that China's economic growth rate may be much lower than official statistics suggest, and that dramatic economic reforms were necessary, such as tax cuts consistent with the lines of supply-side economics of his former academic teacher at Columbia University. The video has since been censored on the Chinese internet, but a copy of the video has been uploaded to Youtube, where it has over 1 million views as of December 28.
