= Ningbo (disambiguation) =

Ningbo is a city in Zhejiang, China.

Ningbo may also refer to:

- Ningbo Metropolitan Area, A metropolitan area including Ningbo and three other cities in Zhejiang, China
- Ningbo dialect, dialect of Wu, one of the subdivisions of Chinese spoken language
- Port of Ningbo, in Ningbo, China
- 3543 Ningbo, main-belt asteroid
