= Hong Kong International Academy of Policing =

Police academy based in Hong Kong

The Hong Kong International Academy of Policing
- 香港國際警務學院
- Founded: November 11, 2026; 11 days ago
- Headquarters: Hong Kong
- Website: https://www.police.gov.hk/hkiap/en/index.html#collaborative

The Hong Kong International Academy of Policing (HKIAP) is a specialised police training institute operated by the Hong Kong Police Force.

== Formation ==
It was established in late 2026, as part of the 15th Five-Year Plan to provide training and formalise ties with police forces in the Middle East, ASEAN and other countries. At the opening ceremony, a representative from the Hong Kong Police Force signed memoranda of understanding with representatives from the police academies of Cambodia and Saudi Arabia, to deepen bilateral police training exchanges and jointly address future transnational law enforcement challenges.

== Training ==
The main categories of programmes offered are training programmes and police leadership forums. The academy plans to train 1000 police officers a year, of which 200 from overseas police forces. The training offered will cover strategic command, counterterrorism, crisis management and criminal investigation.
