= Coordinated Development of the Beijing-Tianjin-Hebei Region =

Regional development strategy in China

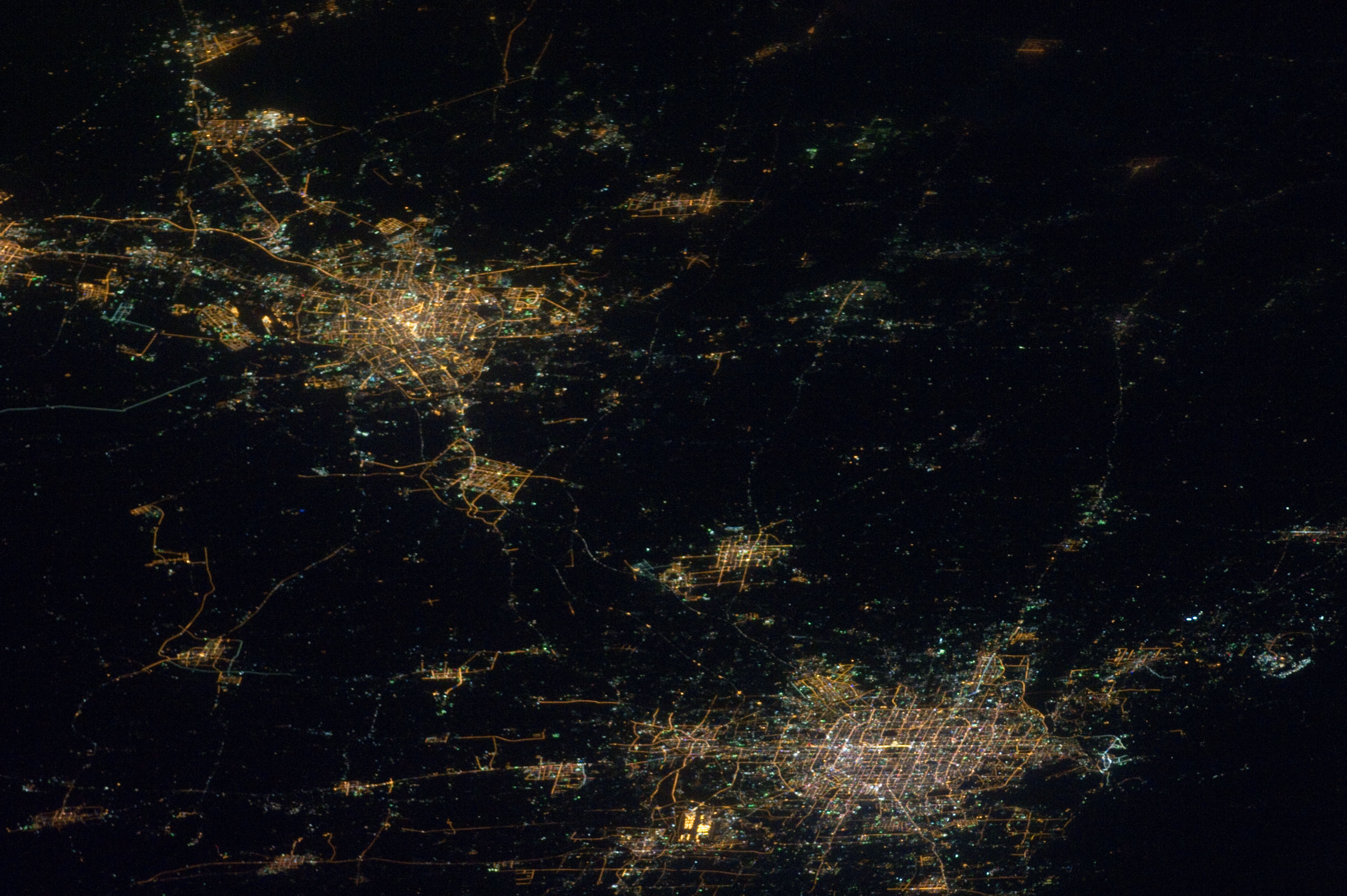
Night views of Beijing (lower right), Tianjin (upper left) and several towns in Hebei Province taken from the International Space Station

Coordinated Development of the Beijing-Tianjin-Hebei Region, also called the BTH Coordinated Development, a regional development strategy in China covering Beijing, Tianjin, and Hebei. It is a major national strategy since the 18th National Congress of the Chinese Communist Party to achieve complementary advantages between the two regions, promote the development of the Bohai Rim Economic Zone, and drive the development of northern China.

On April 30, 2015, CCP General Secretary Xi Jinping chaired a meeting of the Politburo and reviewed and approved the Outline of the Beijing-Tianjin-Hebei Coordinated Development Plan, pointing out that the core of the Beijing-Tianjin-Hebei coordinated development strategy is to "orderly relieve Beijing's non-capital functions, adjust the economic structure and spatial structure, take a new path of intensive development, explore a model for optimizing the development of densely populated and economically intensive areas, promote regional coordinated development, and form new growth poles."

During the fourteenth five-year plan period, the plan focused on the decentralization of Beijing's non-capital functions, build a policy system for decentralization, and implement a number of landmark decentralization projects. The plan focused on building Xiong'an New Area with high standards and quality, accelerate the construction of the launch area and the starting area, and promote innovation in the management system. The plan built Beijing's sub-city center with high quality and promote integrated development with Sanhe, Xianghe, and Dachang counties in Hebei Province. The plan promoted the high-quality development of Tianjin Binhai New Area and support the construction of Zhangjiakou's capital water conservation functional area and ecological environment support area. The plan improved the basic research and original innovation capabilities of Beijing's science and technology innovation center, give full play to the pioneering role of Zhongguancun National Independent Innovation Demonstration Zone, and promote the deep integration of the Beijing-Tianjin-Hebei industrial chain and innovation chain. The plan focused on basically building a Beijing-Tianjin-Hebei region on the track and improve the coordination level of airport clusters and port clusters. The plan included deepening joint prevention, control, and treatment of air pollution and strengthen the comprehensive management of groundwater overexploitation and land subsidence in North China.

== Background ==
Regional economic integration helps promote the coordinated development of urban areas at all levels and of all types, such as the coordinated development of the capital economic circle centered on London, Tokyo, Seoul, and Paris. Since the reform and opening up, especially since 1990, China's regional economy has grown rapidly, but the imbalance of regional economy has continued to intensify. The Beijing-Tianjin-Hebei region has formed an economic cliff zone surrounding Beijing and Tianjin. The "poverty belt around Beijing and Tianjin" has become a hot topic of social concern. The economic imbalance in the Beijing-Tianjin-Hebei region has gradually received the common attention of the three parties. "Beijing-Tianjin-Hebei regional integration" and "capital economic circle" have been written into the national "12th Five-Year Plan". However, due to the combined constraints of natural conditions and human factors, the coordinated development of the Beijing-Tianjin-Hebei regional economy has been bumpy, and the situation faced by the "poverty belt around Beijing and Tianjin" formed in history was still grim.

In October 2001, the Ministry of Construction organized more than 100 experts to discuss the "Beijing-Tianjin-Hebei North Urban and Rural Spatial Development Planning Research" chaired by Academician Wu Liangyong, an architect at Tsinghua University. The research proposed a planning concept with Beijing and Tianjin as the two cores, Tangshan and Baoding as the two wings, Langfang as the hinterland, and some areas around the Bohai Sea as the integration (Beijing-Tianjin-Hebei North, also known as the Greater Beijing Area, refers to the two triangular areas of Beijing - Tianjin -Tangshan and Beijing-Tianjin-Baoding governed by Beijing, Tianjin, Tangshan, Baoding, Langfang and other cities, as well as parts of the surrounding cities of Chengde, Qinhuangdao, Zhangjiakou, Cangzhou and Shijiazhuang. The central area covers an area of nearly 70,000 square kilometers and has a population of about 40 million).

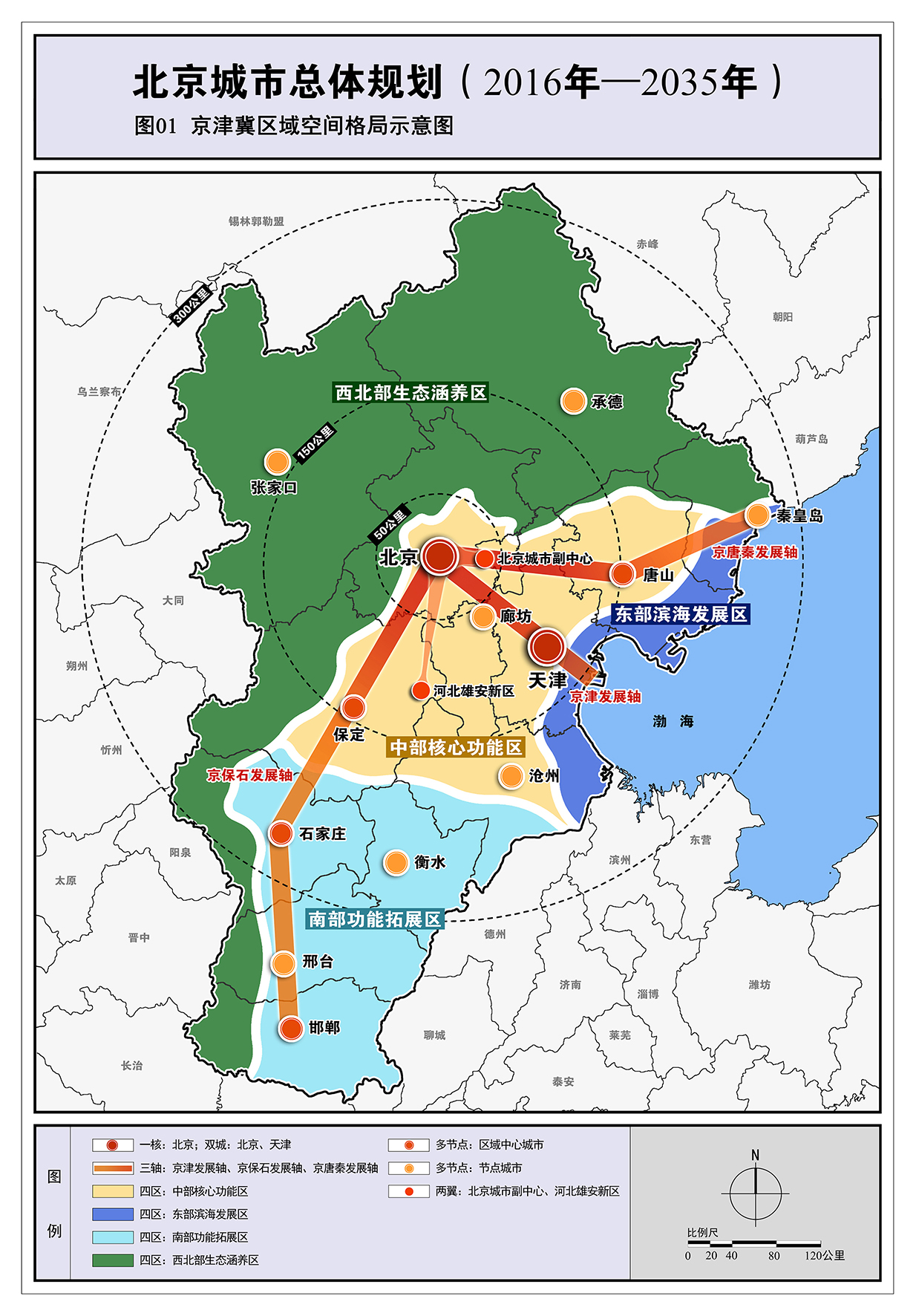
Schematic diagram of the spatial pattern of the Beijing-Tianjin-Hebei region

Between February 12–13, 2004, the National Development and Reform Commission convened the Development and Reform Commissions of Beijing, Tianjin and Hebei in Langfang to reach the "Langfang Consensus" on strengthening economic exchanges and cooperation between Beijing, Tianjin and Hebei. On November 12, 2004, as the first region for the national regional planning during China's "Eleventh Five-Year Plan", the preliminary research work on the Beijing-Tianjin-Hebei metropolitan area planning was officially launched and the "Beijing-Tianjin-Hebei Special Regional Planning and Comprehensive Planning Research Report" was formed. In 2005, the media reported that the specific implementation plan for the Beijing-Tianjin-Hebei regional planning was expected to be released in March 2006 and then submitted to the State Council for approval.

In May 2013, Xi Jinping, General Secretary of the CCP Central Committee, President of the People's Republic of China, and Chairman of the Central Military Commission, proposed during his research in Tianjin that we should write a "Twin Cities Tale" of Beijing and Tianjin in the new era of socialist modernization. In August 2013, when Xi Jinping presided over a study of Hebei's development issues in Beidaihe, he proposed to promote the coordinated development of Beijing, Tianjin and Hebei. On February 26, 2014, Xi Jinping presided over a symposium in Beijing, listened to a report on the coordinated development of Beijing, Tianjin and Hebei, and delivered an important speech.

In February 2016, the "13th Five-Year Plan for the Beijing-Tianjin-Hebei Region's National Economic and Social Development" was issued. This is China's first cross-provincial 13th Five-Year Plan. Beijing, Tianjin and Hebei will compile their own 13th Five-Year Plans based on this plan.

In April 2017, the CCP Central Committee and the State Council decided to establish the Xiongan New Area in the eastern part of Baoding City, Hebei Province, as a centralized location for the relocation of non-capital functions from Beijing.

== Leadership ==
In order to promote the coordinated development of Beijing, Tianjin and Hebei, the State Council established the Beijing-Tianjin-Hebei Coordinated Development Leading Group and the corresponding office and the Beijing-Tianjin-Hebei Coordinated Development Expert Advisory Committee.

=== Leadership team ===
Zhang Gaoli, member of the Standing Committee of the Political Bureau of the CCP Central Committee and Vice Premier of the State Council, served as the first head of the Beijing-Tianjin-Hebei Coordinated Development Leading Group.

=== Expert Advisory Committee ===
The Beijing-Tianjin-Hebei Coordinated Development Expert Advisory Committee is divided into four groups: planning and transportation group, energy and environment group, capital function positioning and appropriate decongestion group, and industry group. The head of the expert committee is Xu Kuangdi, academician of the Chinese Academy of Engineering and vice chairman of the 10th National Committee of the Chinese People's Political Consultative Conference, and the deputy head is Wu Hequan, academician of the Chinese Academy of Engineering and member of the National Information Security Group. The committee members include Zhang Junkuo, deputy director of the Development Research Center of the State Council, Xie Kechang, academician of the Chinese Academy of Engineering and coal chemical expert, Wei Fusheng, academician of the Chinese Academy of Engineering and researcher of the China National Environmental Monitoring Center, Han Buxing, academician of the Chinese Academy of Sciences, Zhao Pei, secretary general of the China Metal Society, Zhu Sendi, vice president of the China Machinery Industry Federation, Li Xiaojiang, president of the China Academy of Urban Planning and Design, Li Ping, Lu Huapu, director of the Institute of Transportation of Tsinghua University, Lin Zhonghong, vice president of the Economic Planning Institute of China Railway Corporation, Guo Jifu, director of the Beijing Transportation Development Research Center, Liu Bingsuan, dean of the Institute of Economic and Social Development of Nankai University, and He Hong, researcher of the Ecological Environment Research Center of the Chinese Academy of Sciences.

== Provincial and municipal agreements ==
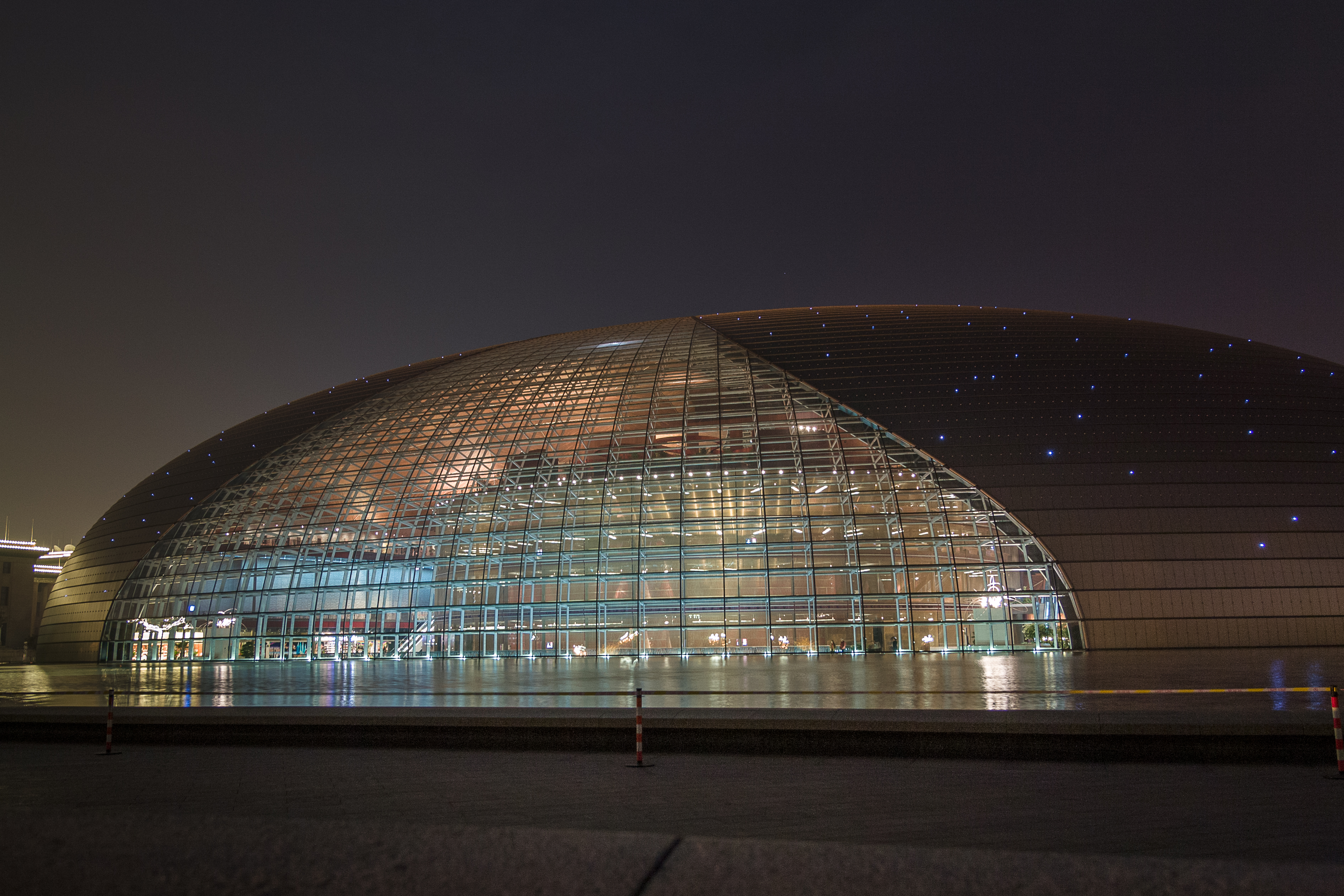
Beijing National Centre for the Performing Arts

=== Cooperation Agreement between Beijing, Tianjin and Hebei ===
On May 26, 2019, Beijing Tongzhou District, Tianjin Baodi District, and Tangshan City, Hebei Province signed a strategic cooperation framework agreement to strengthen cooperation with the Beijing-Tangshan Intercity Railway as a link.

=== Agreement between Beijing and Tianjin ===
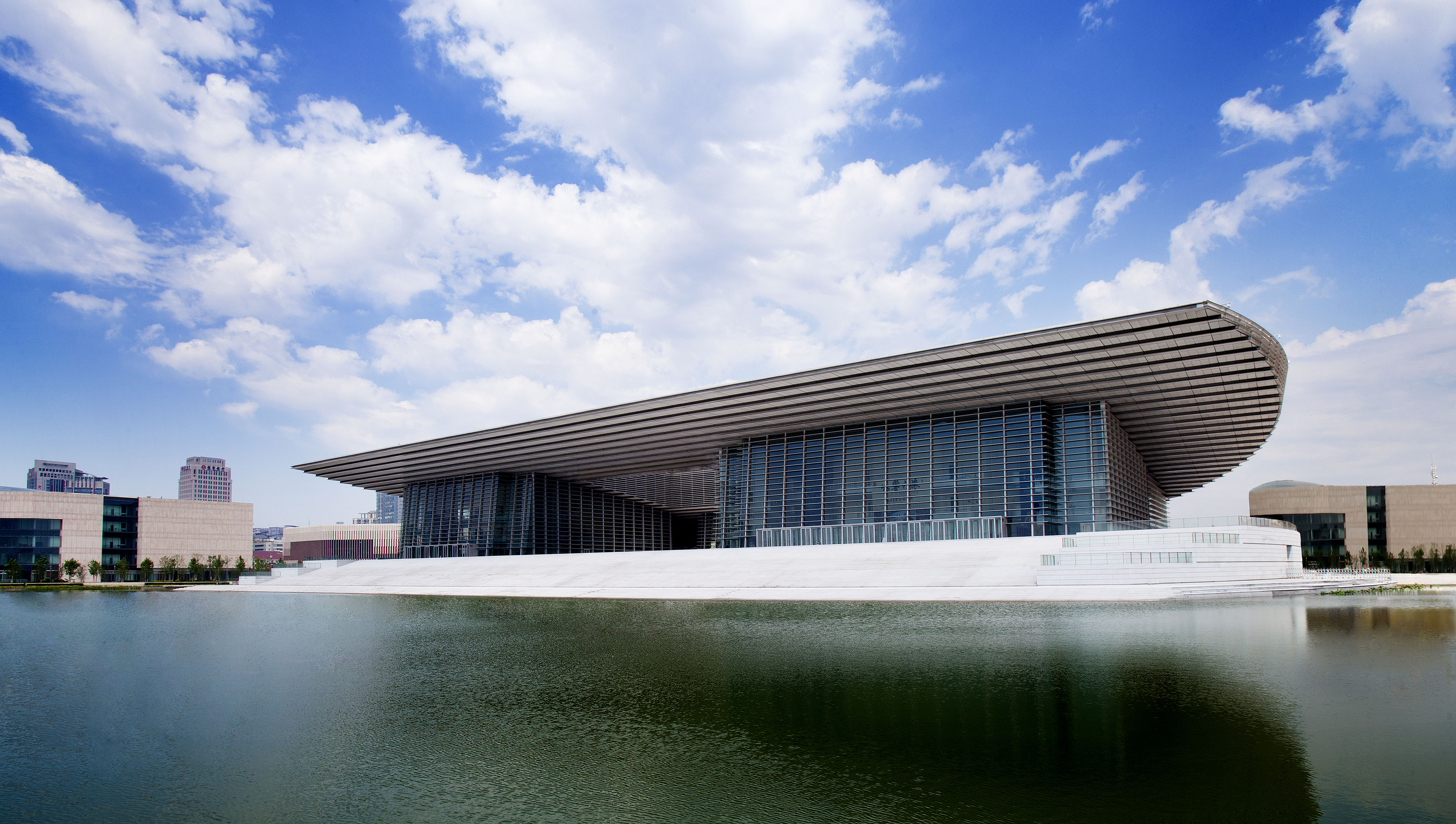
Tianjin Grand Theatre

On August 6, 2014, a delegation of Tianjin Party and government officials visited Beijing for study and inspection. After the inspection, a signing ceremony for the cooperation agreement between Tianjin and Beijing was held. Beijing Mayor Wang Anshun and Tianjin Mayor Huang Xingguo signed six cooperation agreements.

- "Agreement on key tasks for implementing the major national strategy of coordinated development of Beijing, Tianjin and Hebei"
- "Cooperation Framework Agreement on Jointly Building Binhai-Zhongguancun Science Park"
- Agreement on Further Strengthening Cooperation in Environmental Protection
- Agreement on Accelerating the Process of Market Integration
- "Cooperation Framework Agreement on Jointly Promoting the Construction of the Beijing-Tianjin Cooperation Demonstration Zone in Tianjin Future Science and Technology City"
- Memorandum of Cooperation on Transport Integration

=== Agreement between Beijing and Hebei Province ===
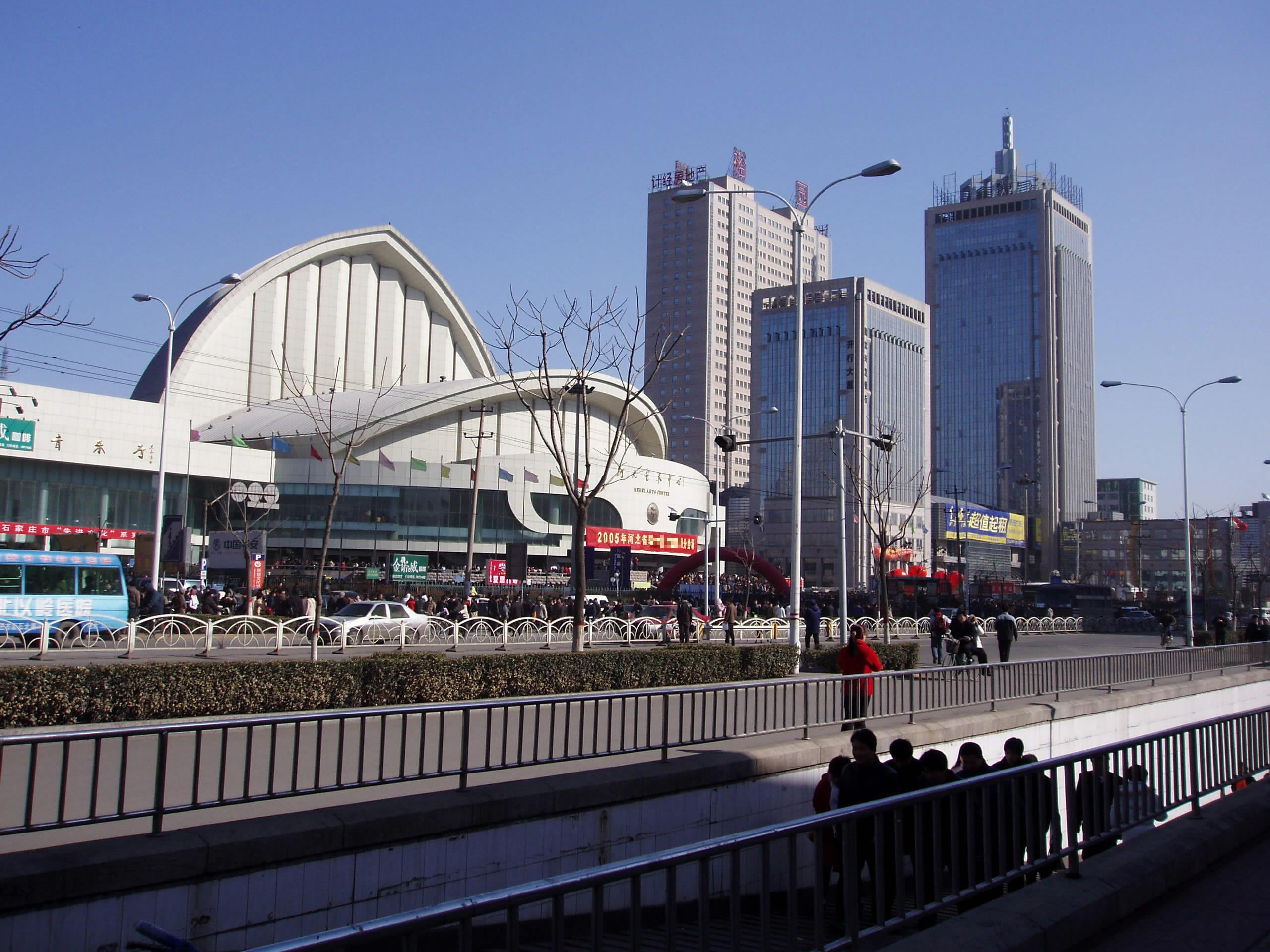
Shijiazhuang Hebei Art Center

On July 31, 2014, a delegation of the Hebei Provincial Party and Government went to Beijing for study and inspection. After the inspection, a signing ceremony for the cooperation agreement between Hebei Province and Beijing was held. Beijing Mayor Wang Anshun and Hebei Provincial Governor Zhang Qingwei signed seven cooperation agreements.

- Framework Agreement on Jointly Building Caofeidian Collaborative Development Demonstration Zone
- Agreement on Jointly Building the Beijing New Airport Economic Cooperation Zone
- Agreement on Jointly Accelerating Ecological and Environmental Construction in Zhangcheng Area
- Agreement on Jointly Accelerating the Process of Market Integration
- Cooperation Agreement on Jointly Promoting Collaborative Development of the Logistics Industry
- Memorandum of Cooperation on Transport Integration

=== Agreement between Tianjin and Hebei Province ===
On August 24, 2014, a delegation of the Hebei Provincial Party and Government went to Tianjin for study and inspection. After the inspection, a signing ceremony for the Hebei-Tianjin cooperation agreement was held. Tianjin Mayor Huang Xingguo and Hebei Provincial Governor Zhang Qingwei signed five cooperation agreements.

- Framework Agreement on Strengthening Cooperation in Ecological Environment Construction
- "Cooperation Framework Agreement on Promoting Collaborative Development of Education"
- "Cooperation Framework Agreement on Jointly Building the Hebei-Tianjin (Shexian-Tianjin Railway) Circular Economy Industry Demonstration Zone"
- Framework Agreement on Cooperation in Promoting Regional Market Integration
- Memorandum of Cooperation on Transport Integration

== Infrastructure and industrial transfer ==
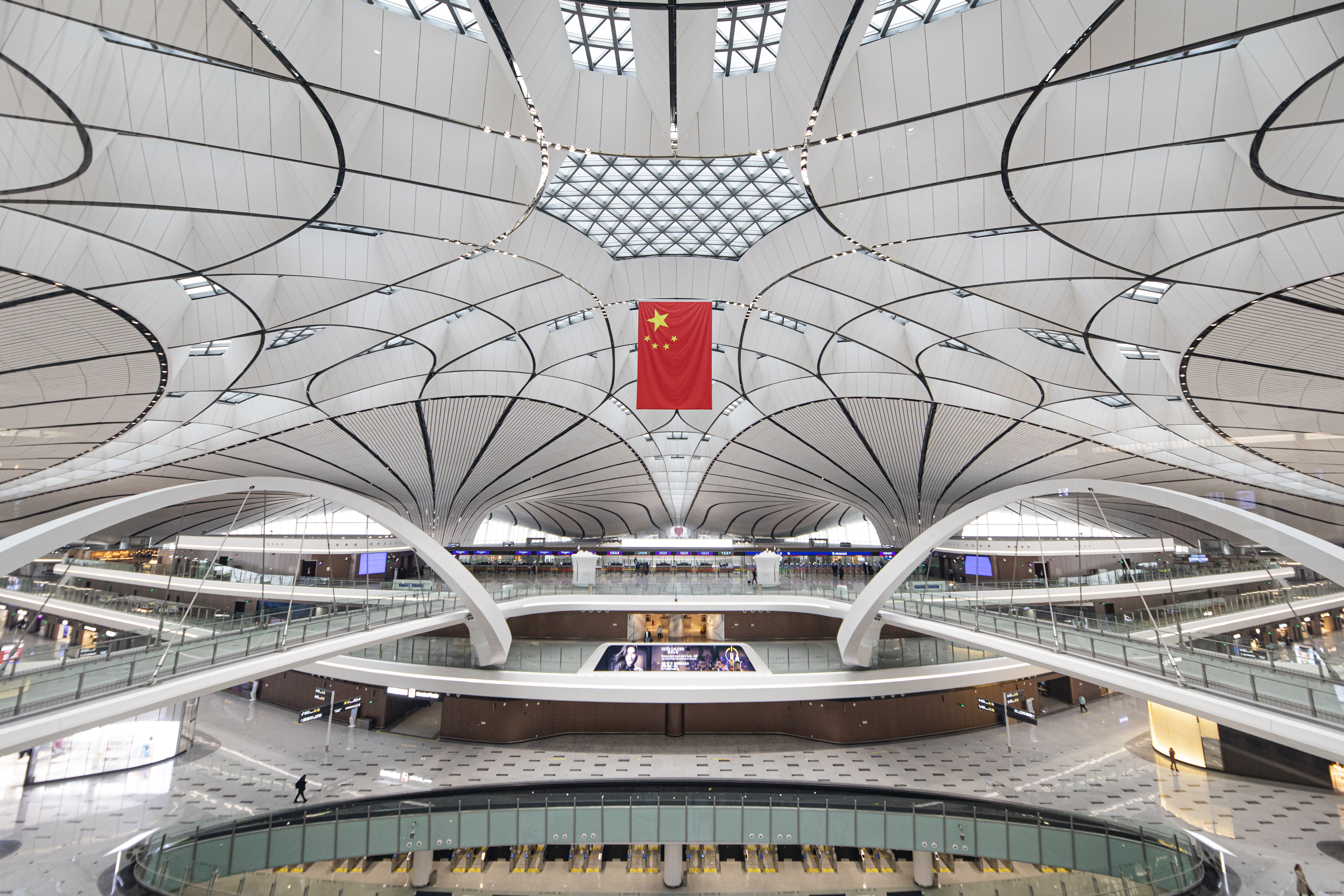
Beijing Daxing International Airport

On August 18, 2014, Tianjin Port Group and Hebei Port Group jointly invested RMB 2 billion to register and establish Bohai Jingji Port Investment Development Co., Ltd. in Tianjin Dongjiang Bonded Port Area, with the aim of making overall planning and utilization of port resources and shipping elements in Tianjin and Hebei Province, and optimizing the rational division of labor and industrial layout of ports in the Beijing-Tianjin-Hebei region. On December 30, the governments of Beijing, Tianjin and Hebei Province and China Railway Corporation signed an agreement to jointly invest in the establishment of Beijing-Tianjin-Hebei Intercity Railway Investment Co., Ltd. with a registered capital of RMB 10 billion in a ratio of 3:3:3:1.
