= Xi Jinping Thought on Economy =

Chinese ideological doctrine

Xi Jinping Thought on Economy (Chinese: 习近平经济思想) is the current economic doctrine of the People's Republic of China. It is a part of the larger Xi Jinping Thought, which is derived from the speeches of general secretary of the Chinese Communist Party Xi Jinping. It was established during the Central Economic Work Conference, held in December 2017.

== History ==
Many contents of the Xi Jinping Thought on Economy originate from the Double Eight Strategy drafted when Xi was the Party Secretary of Zhejiang, which listed eight comparative advantages of Zhejiang and eight corresponding actions to improve the province. On 12 March 2016, Xinhua News Agency published an article stating that Xi Jinping’s political economy had eight aspects: "people-centered", "moderately well-off", "basic economic system", "new development concept", "'two-handed' theory", "new normal", "supply side", and "open economy".

The Xi Jinping Economic Thought on Socialism with Chinese Characteristics for a New Era was put forward during the Central Economic Work Conference on 18 December 2017. In 2021, it was shortened to Xi Jinping Thought on Economy. In July 2021, the People's Daily reported that a Xi Jinping Economic Thought Research Center would be established in the National Development and Reform Commission. On 18 January 2022, the center was launched with the approval of the CCP Central Committee.

== Contents ==
The Outline for Studying Xi Jinping Thought on Economy, which was compiled by the Publicity Department of the Chinese Communist Party and the National Development and Reform Commission summarizes the basic contents of Xi Jinping Thought on Economy into thirteen aspects:

- Strengthening the Party’s overall leadership over economic work.
- Adhering to the people-centered development philosophy.
- Entering a new development stage.
- Adhering to the new concept for development.
- Building a new development pattern.
- Promoting high-quality development.
- Adhering to and improving the socialist basic economic system.
- Adhering to problem-oriented deployment and implementation of major national development strategies.
- Adhering to innovation-driven development.
- Vigorously developing manufacturing and the real economy.
- Unswervingly expanding opening up in an all-round way.
- Coordinating development and security.
- Adhering to correct work strategies and methods is the methodology for doing a good job in economic work.
