= Ningbo metropolitan area =

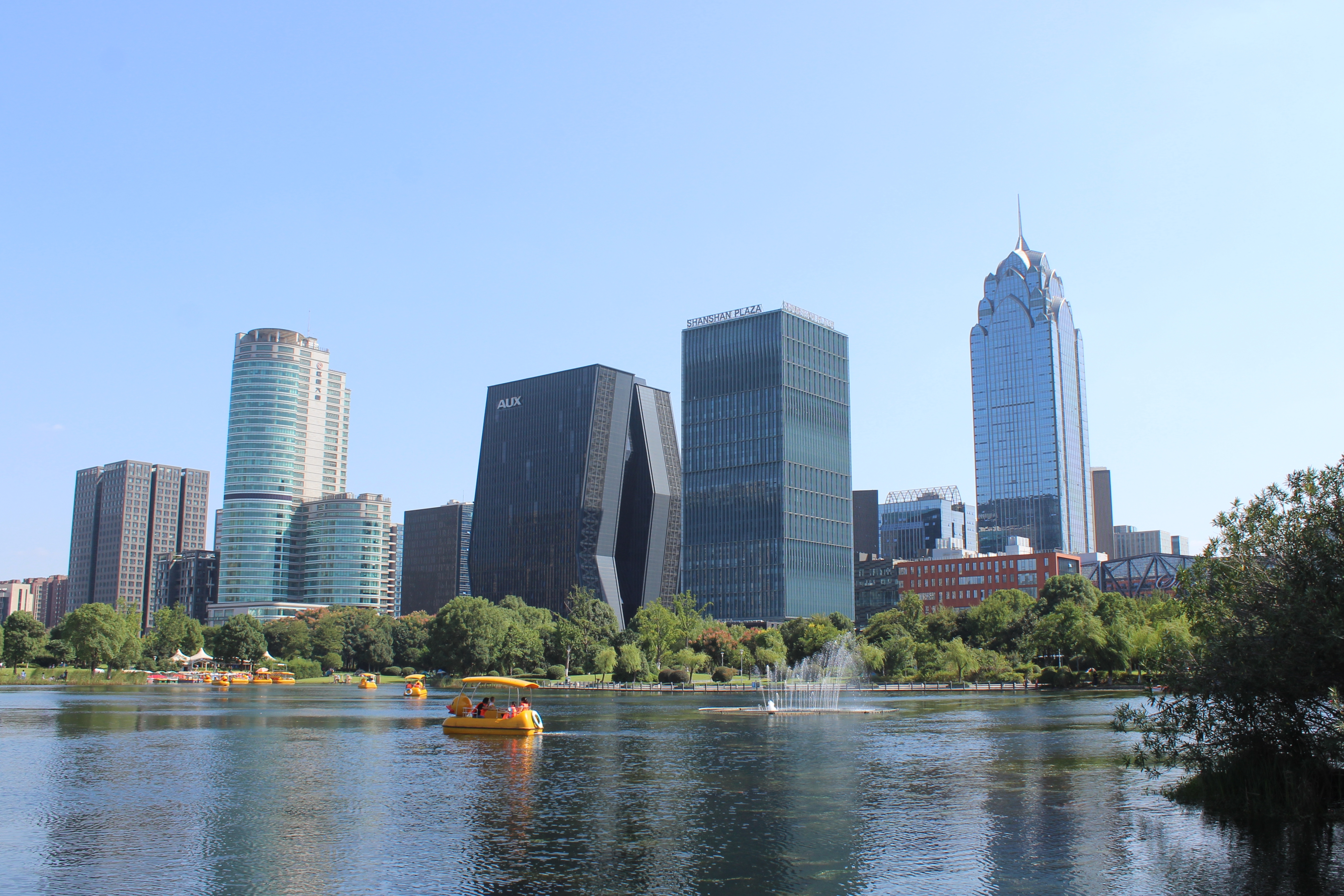
Ningbo South Business District in 2018

The Ningbo metropolitan area consists of the following cities:

- Ningbo (core city),
- Zhoushan
- Taizhou
- Shaoxing: Shengzhou County, Xinchang County

It is positioned as the leading region of the Yangtze River Economic Belt and the strategic fulcrum of the "One Belt, One Road " strategy, forming a two-way radiation between the ocean and the hinterland.

== History ==
The history of the Ningbo metropolitan area dates back to 1726 AD during the Qing dynasty. The Ningshaotai Circuit is a historical political division of China that includes the four current cities of Zhejiang province in China: Ningbo, Zhoushan, Shaoxing, and Taizhou.
