= Strategy for Integrated Development of the Yangtze River Delta =

Chinese economic development strategy

Strategy for Integrated Development of the Yangtze River Delta, also called the YD Integrated Development, is the economic development strategy of China for the Yangtze Delta urban agglomeration, covering Shanghai, Jiangsu, Zhejiang, Anhui. The strategy was first proposed by Xi Jinping, then Party Secretary of Zhejiang, in January 2003. In 2018, Xi Jinping, now General Secretary of the Chinese Communist Party, announced his support for the integration of the Yangtze River Delta to become a national strategy, and in the same year it was included in the Government Work Report of Premier Li Keqiang.

In 2019, the State Council issued the Outline of the Regional Integrated Development Plan for the Yangtze River Delta, with the goal of creating the largest urban agglomeration in China and the sixth largest in the world. This is considered to be the full formation of the New Jiangnan, marking the full recovery of the political, economic and cultural status of the Jiangnan region.

== History ==
=== Regional historical background ===
The Jiangsu, Zhejiang, Shanghai and Anhui regions share a common historical and cultural background. They were historically known as Wuyue and the Eastern Chu region. Their civilizations began with the Lingjiatan culture and the Liangzhu culture. In the pre-Qin period, they belonged to the Huaiyi and Baiyue regions. In the Spring and Autumn period, they were divided into the Chu, Wu and Yue regions. In the Warring States period, the Yangtze River Delta region was monopolized by the Chu State. In the later period, it was the political and cultural center of the Chu State. The "Lüshi Chunqiu" states that "Wu and Yue are adjacent to each other, with the same customs and language. We can live in their land." The core is the Wu language area around the Taihu Lake Basin, which was also called Xiaojiangnan in the Ming and Qing Dynasties.

The cultural formation of the Yangtze River Delta region is believed to have begun during the Six Dynasties, when Nanjing was the national economic, political, and cultural center. During the Song Dynasty, the Yangtze River Delta region was divided into Lianghuai, Liangzhe, and Liangjiang, and once again became the political and cultural center of the national regime. During the Ming Dynasty, the Yangtze River Delta region belonged to Nanzhili and Zhejiang Province. Its economic and cultural status in the country reached its peak during the Ming and Qing Dynasties, and it was "the best in the country".

After the establishment of the Nanjing National Government, the Yangtze River Delta region became the political, economic, and cultural center of the Republic of China, and the political, economic, educational, and financial foundation of the Nanjing government. This also led to the slow development of the Jiangnan region after the establishment of the People's Republic of China, and a period of decline. In Zhejiang Province, the state-owned investment between 1949 and 1978 was only 7.7 billion yuan. To this day, the number of state-owned enterprises ranks last in the country.

=== Early collaboration development ===
After Shanghai opened as a port in 1843, it replaced Suzhou and became the economic center of the Yangtze River Delta. According to the population statistics of Shanghai in January 1950, local residents in Shanghai accounted for only 15% of the total population of the city. The remaining 85% came from other places, with the majority coming from Jiangsu and Zhejiang. Among them, more than 2.3 million people were from Jiangsu, accounting for 48.6%; more than 1.2 million people were from Zhejiang, accounting for 26.1%. Since then, Shanghai has had close ties with Jiangsu and Zhejiang, with frequent exchanges of people, money and goods.

In November 1954, after the East China Bureau of the CCP Central Committee stopped its external work, the CCP Central Committee decided to establish the Shanghai Bureau of the CCP Central Committee. Its main responsibilities were to focus on rural areas, and to carry out the socialist transformation of the ownership of means of production in Shanghai, Jiangsu and Zhejiang, as well as to inspect, investigate and understand the implementation of the central government's instructions and policies. In July 1957, the Shanghai Bureau of the CCP Central Committee convened an economic cooperation meeting for Jiangsu, Zhejiang, Anhui, Fujian, Jiangxi and Shanghai, and later decided to establish an economic cooperation committee. In February 1958, the CCP Central Committee made the "Decision on Convening a Regional Cooperation Meeting", pointing out that "Shanghai, Jiangsu, Zhejiang, Anhui, Fujian, Shandong and Jiangxi are the East China Cooperation Zone" as a consultation body for economic work. Later, in June of the same year, the "Decision on Strengthening the Work of the Cooperation Zone" was made, and each cooperation zone established a cooperation zone committee. In September 1960, the Shanghai Bureau was abolished.

In September 1960, the Politburo of the CCP decided to establish six central bureaus, including the East China Bureau. On January 18, 1961, the Ninth Plenary Session of the Eighth CCP Central Committee passed the "Resolution on the Establishment of Central Bureaus", which clearly stated that "each central bureau's main task is to establish a relatively complete economic system in its region". The "Resolution" also pointed out that the East China Bureau of the CCP Central Committee represented the CCP Central Committee in leading the six provinces and one city of Shanghai, Jiangsu, Zhejiang, Jiangxi, Fujian, Anhui, and Shandong. On January 17, 1967, in response to the Cultural Revolution, the East China Bureau was attacked by the " rebels " and stopped working.

=== Shanghai Economic Zone Period ===
Although the economic development of the Yangtze River Delta is decentralized, the economy of the Yangtze River Delta region will tend to be integrated. In 1980, Shanghai launched a discussion on "Where is Shanghai going?", including a study on "Research on the establishment of a Yangtze River Delta economic zone centered on Shanghai" conducted by five people from the Shanghai Institute of Science Studies, East China Normal University and Wenhui Daily. In December 1982, after visiting East China, Vice Premier Yao Yilin submitted a report on "Preliminary Concept of Establishing the Yangtze River Delta Economic Zone" to the central government.

On December 22, 1982, the State Council issued the "Notice on the Establishment of the Shanghai Economic Zone Planning Office and the Shanxi Energy Base Planning Office", deciding to establish the Shanghai Economic Zone, which was the prototype of the Yangtze River Delta Economic Zone. On March 22, 1983, the Shanghai Economic Zone Planning Office was formally established in Shanghai. At that time, the scope of the Shanghai Economic Zone was centered on Shanghai, including Suzhou, Wuxi, Changzhou, Nantong and Hangzhou, Jiaxing, Huzhou, Ningbo, Shaoxing and other cities in the Yangtze River Delta. On August 18 of the same year, the Shanghai Economic Zone held a planning work meeting. In December 1984, Anhui, Jiangxi and Fujian provinces joined the Shanghai Economic Zone.

As the Shanghai Economic Zone continued to expand and economic cooperation within the zone gradually unfolded, Shanghai began to experience a decline in fiscal revenue and gradually developed urban diseases. Its status and role as the central city of the economic zone declined. Jiangsu and Zhejiang, on the other hand, saw their economic strength greatly enhanced due to the rapid development of township enterprises and private economy. The Shanghai Economic Zone was also unable to break the gap between the "economic zone" and the "administrative zone" and explore a new development path. On June 1, 1988, the State Planning Commission decided to abolish the Shanghai Economic Zone Planning Office, and the cooperative development between Shanghai and the Yangtze River Delta region was temporarily terminated.

=== Cooperation development suspension period ===
As early as 1988, the famous sociologist Fei Xiaotong began to plan the future development of the Yangtze River Delta. He believed that "Shanghai, located in the Yangtze River Delta, is the most suitable. If Shanghai is the leader, Jiangsu and Zhejiang are the two wings, and the Yangtze River Basin is the backbone, accelerating the economic development of this region will drive the overall take-off." Afterwards, he met with the main leaders of the Yangtze River Delta region many times to make suggestions for the development of the Yangtze River Delta. On April 9, 1990, Fei Xiaotong submitted the "Preliminary Idea on the Establishment of the Yangtze River Delta Economic Development Zone" to the CCP Central Committee in the name of the China Democratic League, and the next day it was approved by Jiang Zemin, then CCP General Secretary.

In June 1992, the State Council held a symposium on the economic planning of the Yangtze River Delta and along the Yangtze River. The meeting pointed out that the Yangtze River Delta region includes Shanghai, Nanjing, Zhenjiang, Yangzhou, Suzhou, Wuxi, Changzhou, Nantong in Jiangsu Province, Hangzhou, Jiaxing, Huzhou, Ningbo, Shaoxing, Zhoushan in Zhejiang Province, and 74 counties (cities) under their jurisdiction; in October of the same year, the 14th National Congress wrote into the report of the Party Congress that "taking the development and opening up of Shanghai Pudong as the leader, further opening up the cities along the Yangtze River, and quickly building Shanghai into one of the international economic, financial and trade centers, driving a new leap forward in the economy of the Yangtze River Delta and the entire Yangtze River Basin".

=== Planning for integrated development ===
In December 2002, after Xi Jinping took office as the Secretary of the Zhejiang Provincial Committee of the Chinese Communist Party, he stated at the Second Plenary Session (Enlarged) of the 11th Zhejiang Provincial Committee of the CCP that he would "take the initiative to connect with Shanghai and actively participate in economic cooperation and exchanges in the Yangtze River Delta region." In January of the following year, Xi Jinping pointed out at the First Session of the 10th Zhejiang Provincial People's Congress that "with the Hangzhou Bay area as the forerunner, we will take the initiative to connect with Shanghai, cooperate in infrastructure and information construction, industrial division of labor, energy development and utilization, environmental protection and other aspects, and actively promote the integrated development of the Yangtze River Delta region's economy." This was the first time that the "integrated development of the Yangtze River Delta region's economy" was proposed. This year is also known in the industry as the "first year of the Yangtze River Delta".

In March 2003, Xi Jinping proposed the establishment of a regular meeting mechanism for the main leaders of the Yangtze River Delta region, and since then, regional cooperation in the Yangtze River Delta has heated up. That year, Zhejiang signed the "Agreement on Further Promoting Economic Cooperation and Development between Shanghai and Zhejiang" and the "Agreement on Further Strengthening Economic and Technological Exchanges and Cooperation" with Shanghai and Jiangsu respectively, and issued the "Several Opinions on Actively Connecting with Shanghai and Actively Participating in Cooperation and Exchanges in the Yangtze River Delta Region". In July of the same year, Xi Jinping proposed the "Eight Eight Strategy" at the Fourth Plenary Session of the 11th Zhejiang Provincial Committee of the CCP, which is to further give play to Zhejiang Province's eight advantages and promote eight measures. The second of these measures is "to further give play to Zhejiang's location advantages, actively connect with Shanghai, actively participate in cooperation and exchanges in the Yangtze River Delta region, and continuously improve the level of domestic and foreign opening up".

In 2004, Hefei, Ma'anshan, Wuhu, Chuzhou and Chaohu in Anhui Province attended the "Annual Mayors Summit" of the Yangtze River Delta Urban Economic Coordination Council as "observers" and submitted applications for membership.

In December 2005, the first symposium of major leaders from two provinces and one city in the Yangtze River Delta was held in Hangzhou. This symposium also reiterated the issue of regional cooperation in the Yangtze River Delta.

In March 2007, Xi Jinping was transferred to the position of Secretary of the Shanghai Municipal Committee of the Chinese Communist Party. In May of the same year, Xi Jinping pointed out in his report to the 9th Party Congress of Shanghai that "we should think and plan about the future development of Shanghai in the context of the central government's strategic positioning of Shanghai's development, the general trend of economic globalization, the overall pattern of national development, and the overall deployment of the country for the development of the Yangtze River Delta region." On July 22, Xi Jinping visited Zhejiang and Jiangsu. During this visit, Xi repeatedly made it clear that "cooperation in the Yangtze River Delta region should be strengthened".

On November 30, 2007, a symposium of the main leaders of the two provinces and one city in the Yangtze River Delta was held in Shanghai. At the meeting, it was pointed out that "new requirements were put forward to further improve and enhance the regional coordination mechanism and promote the all-round and in-depth development of cooperation in the Yangtze River Delta region".

In September 2008, the State Council of the People's Republic of China issued the "Guiding Opinions on Further Promoting Reform, Opening-up and Economic and Social Development in the Yangtze River Delta Region", which clearly stated that "the integrated development of the Yangtze River Delta region should be promoted". In December of the same year, a symposium of major leaders in the Yangtze River Delta region was held in Ningbo, and for the first time, major party and government leaders from Anhui Province were invited to attend. As a result, the Yangtze River Delta cooperation formed a "3+1" situation of Shanghai, Jiangsu, Zhejiang and Anhui.

In 2010, the National Development and Reform Commission issued the "Regional Plan for the Yangtze River Delta", defining the Yangtze River Delta region as all 25 prefecture-level cities in Jiangsu, Zhejiang and Shanghai. On the basis of the original 16 cities, Xuzhou, Huai’an, Lianyungang, Suqian, Yancheng, Jinhua, Wenzhou, Lishui and Quzhou were added.

In May 2016, the State Council's executive meeting approved the "Yangtze River Delta Urban Agglomeration Development Plan". Based on the original 25 cities, some cities in Jiangsu and Zhejiang were removed, and eight cities in Anhui Province were included in the Yangtze River Delta Urban Agglomeration. Since then, the scope of the Yangtze River Delta region has expanded from "two provinces and one city" to "three provinces and one city".

In July 2018, the "Three-Year Action Plan for the Integrated Development of the Yangtze River Delta Region (2018-2020)" was issued. The Action Plan covers 12 cooperation topics, including transportation and energy, science and technology innovation, industry, informatization, credit, environmental protection, public services, and business and finance.

==== Yangtze River Delta Special Economic Zone ====
In May 2007, Fudan University and the University of Hong Kong jointly completed a report titled "A Study on the Integration and Transformation of the Yangtze River Delta Economic Zone". The report surveyed 16 cities with relatively high economic development levels in the region, collected more than 2,000 samples and analyzed them, concluding that the Yangtze River Delta's economic level has surpassed that of the Pearl River Delta.

Based on this, the six professors from Fudan University and Hong Kong University who drafted the report proposed to expand the administrative scope of Shanghai and establish the Yangtze River Delta Special Administrative Region. They hoped to further stimulate the sustained economic growth by relying on the improvement of administrative level and the expansion of autonomy. They also hoped that the suggestions and research results on the establishment of a special administrative region would be adopted and finally accepted by the relevant departments, and finally become a reality after being raised to the decision-making and implementation level. The National Development and Reform Commission responded to the suggestion by saying that there was no need to establish a unified special administrative region for the time being, and clearly stated that it did not agree with the so-called "Yangtze River Delta surpassing the Pearl River Delta in all aspects".

On May 23, after Xinmin.com published an article about six professors proposing to establish a special administrative region in the Yangtze River Delta, six professors from Fudan University and the University of Hong Kong issued a statement on May 24, saying that they had "never proposed expanding the administrative territory of Shanghai or establishing a special economic zone in the Yangtze River Delta" and that the Xinmin.com reporter had neither received the above research report nor interviewed them.

=== Elevated to a national strategy ===
On November 5, 2018, at the opening ceremony of the first China International Import Expo, Xi Jinping, then General Secretary of the CCP Central Committee and President of China, delivered a keynote speech, announcing that the integration of the Yangtze River Delta region had been elevated to a national strategy. On November 22, 23, and 30, the Standing Committees of the People's Congresses of Shanghai, Jiangsu, Anhui, and Zhejiang held meetings and voted to pass their respective "Decisions on Supporting and Ensuring Higher-Quality Integrated Development in the Yangtze River Delta Region."

On March 5, 2019, Chinese Premier Li Keqiang mentioned "elevating the integrated development of the Yangtze River Delta region to a national strategy" when delivering the 2018 Government Work Report. On May 13, 2019, the Politburo of the CCP held a meeting to review the Outline of the Integrated Development Plan for the Yangtze River Delta Region. On July 2, Shanghai Mayor Ying Yong revealed at a press conference held by the State Council Information Office that the Outline of the Integrated Development Plan for the Yangtze River Delta Region had been formally reviewed, approved and issued. On October 15, 2019, seven cities, namely Bengbu, Huangshan, Lu'an, Huaibei, Suzhou, Bozhou and Fuyang, joined the Yangtze River Delta Urban Economic Coordination Council. The Yangtze River Delta urban agglomeration has now expanded to 41 cities in Jiangsu, Zhejiang, Anhui and Shanghai. On December 1, 2019, the CCP Central Committee and the State Council officially issued the Outline of the Regional Integrated Development Plan for the Yangtze River Delta.

On November 30, 2023, Xi Jinping hosted a symposium in Shanghai on deepening the integrated development of the Yangtze River Delta. At the symposium, he expressed the need to further promote the integrated development of the Yangtze River Delta.

== Development plan ==
According to the Outline of the Regional Integrated Development Plan for the Yangtze River Delta, the integrated development of the Yangtze River Delta region is positioned as “one pole, three zones and one highland”, that is, to build it into “a strong and active growth pole for national development, a model area for high-quality development, a leading area for the first basic realization of modernization, a demonstration area for regional integrated development and a new highland for reform and opening up in the new era”.

According to Li Jinbin, Party Secretary of Anhui, the Yangtze River Delta region will achieve “six integrations”, namely, spatial layout integration, scientific and technological innovation integration, industrial development integration, market opening integration, ecological and environmental protection integration, and infrastructure and public service integration. The Yangtze River Delta integration sub-planning system involves the construction of metropolitan areas and urban integration, including the Shanghai "1+6" metropolitan area, the Yangtze River urban agglomeration, the Nanjing metropolitan area, the Hefei metropolitan area, the Hangzhou Bay metropolitan area, the Nanjing-Zhenjiang-Yangzhou urban integration, the Suzhou-Wuxi-Changzhou urban integration, the Shanghai-Suzhou-Tongcheng urban integration, the Yangzhou-Taizhou urban integration, the Hangzhou-Jiaxing -Huzhou integration, the Hangzhou-Shaoxing-Ningbo urban integration, etc. Relying on the construction of urban integration pilot areas and demonstration areas between adjacent cities, the integration strategy will eventually be implemented and promoted to form a "super metropolitan area" in the Yangtze River Delta. According to the version officially issued by the CCP Central Committee and the State Council, the scope of the Yangtze River Delta integration planning includes the entire area of Shanghai, Jiangsu Province, Zhejiang Province, and Anhui Province, covering an area of 358,000 square kilometers.

During the "14th Five-Year Plan" period, it is planned to aim at internationally advanced scientific and technological innovation capabilities and industrial systems, accelerate the construction of the Yangtze River Delta G60 Science and Technology Innovation Corridor and the Shanghai-Nanjing Industrial Innovation Belt, and improve the Yangtze River Delta region's ability to allocate global resources and radiate and drive national development. Accelerate infrastructure interconnection, achieve full coverage of high-speed rail in cities at prefecture level and above in the Yangtze River Delta, and promote integrated management of port clusters. Build the Hongqiao International Open Hub, strengthen the open economic agglomeration function of the Lingang New Area of the Shanghai Pilot Free Trade Zone, and deepen the coordinated development of the Shanghai-Jiangsu-Zhejiang-Anhui Pilot Free Trade Zones. Accelerate the sharing of public services and optimize the layout of high-quality education and medical and health resources. Promote joint protection and governance of the ecological environment, and build a high-level demonstration zone for ecological green integrated development in the Yangtze River Delta.

According to the “Decision on Supporting and Safeguarding Higher-Quality Integrated Development in the Yangtze River Delta” adopted earlier by the Standing Committees of the People's Congresses of the four regions, the key areas and tasks for the local people's congresses to support and safeguard the integrated development of the Yangtze River Delta region were clarified, and efforts were made to promote the establishment of a unified market standard system and an interconnected people's livelihood system in the Yangtze River Delta region.

=== Development plans for various regions ===
On June 18, 2019, at the high-end forum "Theory, Methods and Practice of Integrated Development of the Yangtze River Delta Region" hosted by the Nanjing Institute of Geography and Lake Research of the Chinese Academy of Sciences and the Commercial Press, Zhao Yihuai, Party Secretary and Vice President of the Shanghai Development and Reform Research Institute, stated that Shanghai, Jiangsu, Zhejiang and Anhui in the Yangtze River Delta are drafting local implementation plans or action plans based on the national planning outline. Among them, Zhejiang Province passed the "Zhejiang Province Action Plan for Promoting Integrated Development of the Yangtze River Delta Region" on June 14, becoming the first province in the Yangtze River Delta to pass a local development plan. Shanghai issued the "Shanghai Implementation Plan for Implementing the Outline of the Yangtze River Delta Regional Integrated Development Plan" on June 27. Anhui Province and Jiangsu Province passed the "Anhui Province Action Plan for Implementing the Outline of the Yangtze River Delta Regional Integrated Development Plan" and the "Jiangsu Implementation Plan for the Outline of the Yangtze River Delta Regional Integrated Development Plan" in mid-July 2019. In addition, provinces and cities will cooperate with the Office of the National Leading Group to formulate a number of special plans and supporting policies in the form of “1+2+X”.

==== Yangtze River Delta Integration Demonstration Zone ====
In 2011, during the development of Greater Hongqiao in Shanghai, Chen Jianjun, then executive director of the Regional and Urban Development Research Center of Zhejiang University, wrote a report proposing to “use Greater Hongqiao as the hub of the Yangtze River Delta and establish a Yangtze River Delta integration pilot zone”, which was approved by Zhao Hongzhu, then Secretary of the Zhejiang Provincial Party Committee. In 2013, the Yangtze River Delta Common Fund was established, and Chen Jianjun and his team developed a specific plan based on the concept of the “Yangtze River Delta integration pilot zone”. According to the plan, the pilot zone will be centered on the Shanghai Hongqiao hub area, including the wide triangle area including Shanghai Changning, Qingpu, Jiading, Minhang, Kunshan in Jiangsu, and Jiashan in Zhejiang. The plan was approved in 2014, but was not successfully implemented.

In January 2019, the concept of “Yangtze River Delta Integration Demonstration Zone” appeared in the work reports of the Shanghai and Zhejiang governments. On March 6, Li Qiang, member of the Politburo of the CCP and Secretary of the CCP Shanghai Municipal Committee, stated at the plenary meeting of the Shanghai delegation of the National People's Congress that a Yangtze River Delta Integration Demonstration Zone would be established at the junction of Shanghai, Jiangsu and Zhejiang. Before the establishment, relevant discussions had already begun, and Qingpu District of Shanghai, Jiashan County of Zhejiang Province and Wujiang District of Suzhou City of Jiangsu Province, located at the junction of Shanghai, Jiangsu and Zhejiang, became the sites of the integrated demonstration zone. Integration projects in the fields of transportation, infrastructure, and technology in the three places have also been gradually implemented. At present, the demonstration zone has begun to implement pilot projects to explore innovations. For example, the license application for market operators in the three places has been realized in the region. The first enterprise license named after the demonstration zone has been issued in Qingpu District. At the same time, the demonstration zone will also focus on promoting ecological and green integration.

On October 30, 2019, the State Council agreed in principle to the “Overall Plan for the Yangtze River Delta Ecological Green Integrated Development Demonstration Zone”. The plan mentioned that the Yangtze River Delta Integrated Development Demonstration Zone includes Shanghai Qingpu, Jiangsu Wujiang and Zhejiang Jiashan. The next day, the Yangtze River Delta Ecological Green Integrated Development Demonstration Zone was established. The plan proposed to improve the layout of rail transit and strengthen the medium and low-capacity local lines between urban clusters. In June 2020, the Shanghai Transportation Commission went to Suzhou and Jiaxing to coordinate the rail network planning of the demonstration zone to promote the integration of rail transit in the integrated demonstration zone. In the same year, Line 1 of the demonstration zone was included in the “Several Measures of the Jiaxing Municipal Development and Reform Commission to Support Jiashan in Building the Yangtze River Delta Ecological Green Integrated Development Demonstration Zone” and the “List of Key Projects for the “Hub Jiaxing” Campaign and the Construction of a Strong Transportation City”. The line starts at the Oriental Green Boat Station in Qingpu, Shanghai, and ends at the Jiashan Station of the Shanghai-Jiaxing Intercity Railway. The total length is about 36 kilometers (24 kilometers in Jiashan). In the same year, the draft land space planning for the Yangtze River Delta Ecological Green Integrated Development Demonstration Zone proposed to build a multi-level public transportation system consisting of high-speed railways, intercity rail, urban rail and medium and low-capacity buses. At the end of 2020, the mutual recognition of professional titles began to be implemented in the Yangtze River Delta Ecological Green Integrated Development Demonstration Zone.

On May 20, 2021, the Yangtze River Delta Ecological Green Integrated Development Demonstration Zone allowed employees to withdraw Shanghai Housing Provident Fund to repay housing loans in Wujiang District, Suzhou City and Jiashan County, Jiaxing City. On May 31, the Yangtze River Delta Ecological Green Integrated Development Demonstration Zone launched a cross-provincial integrated service window. At the same time, since May, Qingpu, Wujiang and Jiashan in the Yangtze River Delta Demonstration Zone have realized cross-regional medical insurance settlement. In June, 52 enterprises, institutions, research institutes and social organizations including the Shanghai Ecological Society and the Green Digital Development Research Center of the Shanghai Academy of Social Sciences jointly initiated the establishment of the Yangtze River Delta Ecological Green Integrated Development Demonstration Zone Green Low-carbon Development Action Community and jointly issued a green low-carbon development action initiative. The Shanghai Demonstration Zone Line, Jiashan to Xitang Line and Water Village Tourism Line were included in the Yangtze River Delta multi-level rail transit system planning, passing through the Water Village Living Room Station of the Demonstration Zone.

On October 9, 2021, the “Planning and Construction Guidelines for the Pilot Start-up Area of the Yangtze River Delta Ecological Green Integrated Development Demonstration Zone” was implemented. This is the first cross-provincial planning and construction guideline in the People's Republic of China. In September 2022, Jiangsu, Zhejiang, and Shanghai issued the second batch of support policies for the demonstration zones, totaling 17 articles, covering scientific and technological innovation, revitalization of existing assets, joint construction of carbon credit pilot projects, land space utilization, optimization of the business environment, coordinated development of education, talent mobility, law enforcement and judicial coordination, and integrated police services.

In February 2023, the “Overall Plan for the National Land Space of the Yangtze River Delta Ecological Green Integrated Development Demonstration Zone (2021-2035)” was approved. In March 2023, three hospitals in the Yangtze River Delta Integration Demonstration Zone piloted a model of “treatment first, payment later”. On September 7, 2023, 817 designated retail pharmacies in the Yangtze River Delta Integration Demonstration Zone launched real-time cross-provincial medical insurance settlement services. On October 26, 2023, the pilot zone of the Yangtze River Delta Integration Demonstration Zone received a joint reply from the people's governments of Shanghai, Jiangsu, Zhejiang and one city. According to the plan, the planning scope of the pilot zone includes Zhujiajiao Town and Jinze Town in Qingpu District, Shanghai, Lili Town in Wujiang District, Suzhou City, Jiangsu Province, Xitang Town and Yaozhuang Town in Jiashan County, Jiaxing City, Zhejiang Province, covering an area of about 660 square kilometers.

In February 2024, the executive committee of the Yangtze River Delta Integration Demonstration Zone, together with the People's Governments of Qingpu District, Wujiang District, and Jiashan County, jointly issued the “Guidelines for Planning and Construction of the Pilot Start-up Area of the Yangtze River Delta Ecological Green Integration Development Demonstration Zone (Land Use, Public Services, Safety and Resilience) (Trial Implementation)”.

=== Promotion ===
In order to publicize the development of the Yangtze River Delta integration, on October 10, 2018, the Shanghai Municipal Committee of the CCP's official newspaper, Jiefang Daily, launched the Yangtze River Delta Weekly. Subsequently, Dragon TV, a subsidiary of Shanghai Radio and Television Station, also launched a weekly current affairs program, China's Yangtze River Delta, on October 19 of the same year.

On October 28, 2020, the Yangtze River Delta Voice of Shanghai People's Broadcasting Station was launched. It is the first regional radio station in the country opened by a local radio station, mainly broadcasting programs related to the integration of the Yangtze River Delta.

=== Decision-making organization ===
The State Council has established a leading group to promote the integrated development of the Yangtze River Delta, and has set up an office. The group leader is Han Zheng, member of the Standing Committee of the Politburo of the CCP and Vice Premier of the State Council. In January 2018, the Yangtze River Delta Regional Cooperation Office was established. Its office is located in Xuhui District, Shanghai, and is divided into nine working groups.

=== Related Conferences ===
On March 7, 2019, Li Jinbin, Secretary of the CCP Anhui Provincial Committee and Chairman of the Standing Committee of the Anhui Provincial People's Congress, announced at the plenary meeting of the Anhui delegation to the National People's Congress that a symposium of major leaders in the Yangtze River Delta region would be held in Wuhu, Anhui in May 2019, and the first Yangtze River Delta integrated development high-level forum would be held at the same time, marking that the integration of the Yangtze River Delta has entered a new stage.

== Economic development ==
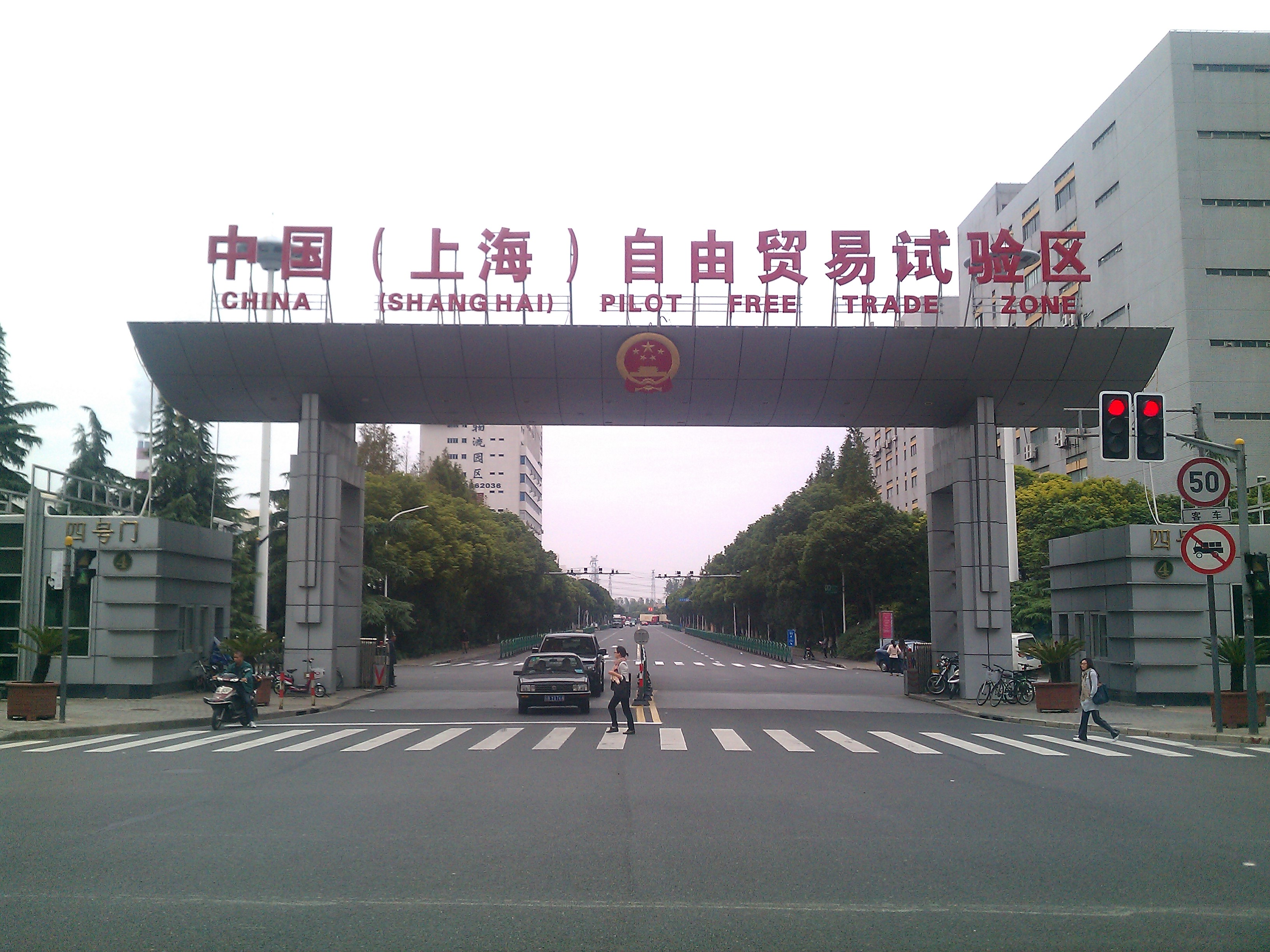
Gate 4 of Shanghai FTZ

The total economic output of the three provinces and one city in the Yangtze River Delta (Shanghai, Jiangsu, Zhejiang, and Anhui) is nearly RMB 20 trillion, accounting for nearly a quarter of China's total. In addition, the economic development of counties in the Yangtze River Delta is relatively balanced. In the 2018 ranking of the top 100 counties in China, Jiangsu, Zhejiang, and Anhui have a total of 43 county-level administrative regions, which has laid a good foundation for regional cooperation.

In terms of free trade zones, the Yangtze River Delta region currently has the Shanghai Free Trade Zone, the Zhejiang Free Trade Zone, and the Jiangsu Free Trade Zone. The collaboration among the three can better promote the integrated development of the Yangtze River Delta. The Lingang New Area of the Shanghai Free Trade Zone, established in August 2019, also pays more attention to the Yangtze River Delta integration strategy. On May 10, 2021, the Yangtze River Delta Free Trade Pilot Zone Alliance was established.

== Specific measures ==
=== Public Affairs ===
On March 14, 2018, the Archives Bureau of Jiangsu Province and the Archives Bureaus of Shanghai, Zhejiang, and Anhui Provinces jointly signed a cooperation agreement in Shanghai to carry out the "remote file search and convenient service" work for people's livelihood archives, which means that residents of Shanghai, Jiangsu, Zhejiang, and Anhui can check people's livelihood archives in different places and across archives. At the same time, Jiangsu Province is also stepping up the development of an online query system for people's livelihood archives. On September 4, 2019, the archives departments of Shanghai, Jiangsu, Zhejiang, and Anhui jointly signed the "Memorandum of Understanding on Key Collaborative Projects of Archives Departments in the Yangtze River Delta Region". After the residents of Shanghai, Jiangsu, Zhejiang, and Anhui pass the real-name verification, they can search online for relevant people's livelihood archives in archives in Shanghai and some cities in Jiangsu, Zhejiang, and Anhui provinces.

On September 28, 2018, Shanghai, Jiaxing, Hangzhou, Jinhua, Suzhou, Huzhou, Xuancheng, Wuhu and Hefei along the G60 Science and Technology Innovation Corridor implemented the “one window, one network, one application” policy, allowing applicants to apply for business licenses and industrial product production licenses in the above cities. Based on the “one network, one application” policy, the above regions also issued the first batch of business licenses and industrial product production licenses in mainland China.

In April 2019, according to information revealed at the Shanghai "One-stop Online Service" work promotion meeting, Shanghai will set up a special window for the Yangtze River Delta "One-stop Online Service" in Jing'an District to realize the remote handling of government services in the Yangtze River Delta region, and at the same time released the Yangtze River Delta region government service "One-stop Online Service" pilot work plan. The plan clearly stated that the first batch of 30 enterprise service items along the G60 Science and Technology Innovation Corridor will be piloted to realize the remote "One-stop Online Service" and plans to promote a number of high-frequency government service items to achieve "one-stop certification, full-network service" online and "separate acceptance, remote service" offline from April to December; the use of electronic certificates and licenses will realize the exemption of service materials and remote issuance of certificates in the Yangtze River Delta city cluster. By 2020, the government service business process in the Yangtze River Delta region will be standardized.

On May 22, 2019, Shanghai, Suzhou, Hangzhou, Jiaxing, Huzhou, Jinhua, Hefei, Wuhu, Xuancheng, Anqing, Ma'anshan, Chuzhou, Chizhou and Tongling realized the first batch of 51 government service items (including 30 corporate service items and 21 personal service items) through the "one-stop service" service in different places. At the same time, a cross-provincial identity authentication system for government service users was established, business standards were unified and standardized, and a flagship store for the "one-stop service" service in the Yangtze River Delta region was set up on the national government service platform. Shanghai, Jiangsu, Zhejiang and Anhui also jointly determined the offline special window work mechanism and standard specifications, and opened 120 offline service points to realize the mutual transfer of the "12345" government service hotline in the Yangtze River Delta. In addition, users who have installed the government service client in any of the four places of Shanghai, Jiangsu, Zhejiang and Anhui on their mobile phones can use the "senseless roaming" service. The first batch of services that realize "senseless roaming" has a total of 176 items. At the same time, 7 types of certificates have also realized electronic certificates on the above-mentioned government service clients. According to the plan, it is expected that by the end of 2019, the 26 cities in the Yangtze River Delta urban agglomeration will be able to implement a “one-stop service” system for all government affairs, and promote the integration of consultation and complaint services on the Yangtze River Delta's “12345” government hotline.

Starting from October 20, 2021, Zhejiang Province will launch a pilot program for the “cross-province application” for first-time resident ID cards. Starting from December 1, 2021, the “cross-province application” for first-time resident ID cards will be implemented in the Yangtze River Delta region.

Starting from November 23, 2021, residents with household registration in the Yangtze River Delta region can apply for household registration of their newborns at the public security bureau in their actual place of residence, and no longer need to return to their place of household registration to apply.

=== Enterprise ===
On July 1, 2020, Yangtze River Delta Investment (Shanghai) Co., Ltd., a state-owned enterprise funded by the Shanghai State-owned Assets Supervision and Administration Commission, was established. It is a Shanghai-owned functional guarantee enterprise and represents Shanghai in the construction of the Yangtze River Delta Integration Demonstration Zone. It was officially listed in Zhujiajiao Town on October 23 of the same year.

On August 25, 2020, the Yangtze River Delta Ecological Green Integrated Development Demonstration Zone Developer Alliance was established. Among the first members were 14 companies and 2 985 universities. The developer alliance continued to expand. In July 2022, the number of members expanded to 53.

=== Government collaboration ===
On May 27, 2018, the Yangtze River Delta Regional Police Integration Work Conference was held in Shanghai. On the same day, the public security organs of Shanghai, Jiangsu, Zhejiang, and Anhui signed the “Yangtze River Delta Regional Police Integration Framework Agreement” at the conference. According to the agreement, the Yangtze River Delta will rely on the construction of smart governments and smart cities in the four regions to achieve data integration and sharing, while strengthening the construction of “smart public security”. In order to cooperate with the first China International Import Expo that year, the public security organs of Shanghai, Jiangsu, Zhejiang, and Anhui also jointly signed the “China International Import Expo Security Police Cooperation Agreement between the Public Security Organs of Shanghai, Jiangsu, Zhejiang, Anhui, and One City”.

In January 2019, the Shanghai, Jiangsu, Zhejiang, and Anhui market supervision bureaus jointly signed the “Memorandum of Cooperation on the Construction of an Integrated Market System in the Yangtze River Delta Region.” According to the document, the Yangtze River Delta will implement the “three links, three interactions, and three unifications” project work plan of “joint construction of business environment, joint management of key areas, joint supervision and law enforcement, market information exchange, mutual recognition of standard systems, and market development integration, and gradually achieve unified market rules, unified credit governance, and unified market supervision.” Subsequently, a joint meeting on market supervision for the construction of an integrated market system in the Yangtze River Delta region was held in Shanghai on April 17.

On April 19, 2019, Shanghai, Jiangsu, Zhejiang, and Anhui signed the "Letter of Intent on Cooperation in Optimizing the Intellectual Property Business Environment in the Yangtze River Delta Region", marking the official launch of the Yangtze River Delta region's intellectual property protection cooperation mechanism.

On July 4, 2019, the Supervisory and Judicial Committees of the People's Congresses of Shanghai, Jiangsu, Zhejiang, and Anhui jointly signed the "Agreement on Deepening the Cooperation Mechanism of the Supervisory and Judicial Work of the People's Congresses in the Yangtze River Delta" at the Yangtze River Delta Regional People's Congress Supervisory and Judicial Work Cooperation Conference. According to the agreement, the Supervisory and Judicial Committees of the People's Congresses of the three provinces and one city will cooperate by establishing a regular exchange mechanism, implementing a liaison system, and improving information sharing channels to promote the interconnection, construction, and sharing of judicial data and information. At the same time, it is planned to establish a Yangtze River Delta judicial expert think tank platform.

On August 24, 2019, the courts of Shanghai, Jiangsu, Zhejiang, and Anhui fully realized cross-regional case filing in the Yangtze River Delta. Earlier in June, the Supreme People's Court pointed out that "it is necessary to accelerate the reform of cross-regional case filing and litigation services" and first realized cross-regional case filing in Shanghai and Jiangsu through "mobile micro-courts". In September of the same year, the three courts in the Yangtze River Delta Integration Demonstration Zone - Jiashan County People's Court of Zhejiang Province, Wujiang District People's Court of Suzhou City, Jiangsu Province, and Qingpu District People's Court of Shanghai jointly announced the establishment of a judicial cooperation mechanism among the three courts.

On August 26, 2020, the Shanghai, Jiangsu, Zhejiang, and Anhui market supervision bureaus jointly signed seven cooperation agreements and one memorandum, covering the integrated development of market supervision technology, strengthening antitrust law enforcement cooperation, unified application of electronic business licenses, joint promotion of green product certification cooperation, capacity verification of inspection and testing institutions, mutual recognition of cooperation in the field of legal metrology, and cooperation on consumer complaint cloud platforms.

In October 2020, the People's Governments of Shanghai, Jiangsu, and Zhejiang Provinces issued the “Catalogue of Government-Approved Investment Projects in the Yangtze River Delta Ecological Green Integrated Development Demonstration Zone (2020 Edition)”. This is the first cross-provincial approval catalogue jointly issued by local governments in the People's Republic of China.

On October 14, 2020, the Shanghai Municipal Public Security Bureau and the Zhejiang Provincial Public Security Department jointly launched the “inter-provincial and municipal household registration online migration” measure between Shanghai and Zhejiang. From that day on, when residents with Shanghai and Zhejiang household registration transfer their household registration between Shanghai and Zhejiang, they only need to apply at the public security police station in the place of transfer, without having to go to the place of transfer to handle it.

On June 23, 2021, the Yangtze River Delta Regional Cooperation Conference of Discipline Inspection and Supervision Agencies was held in Shanghai. The discipline inspection and supervision agencies of Shanghai, Jiangsu, Zhejiang and Anhui signed the “Agreement on Establishing a Cooperation Mechanism for Discipline Inspection and Supervision in the Yangtze River Delta” at the conference.

=== Ecological Environment ===
In 2015, Han Zheng, then member of the Politburo of the CCP and Secretary of the Shanghai Municipal Committee of the CCP, stated at the third working meeting of the Yangtze River Delta Regional Air Pollution Prevention and Control Coordination Mechanism that the Yangtze River Delta "should give greater emphasis to green development, take the lead in improving development quality and efficiency, combine air pollution prevention and control with various development factors such as energy, industry, transportation, and urban planning layout, and achieve a win-win situation for environment and development." As of 2018, the monitoring data of the Yangtze River Delta region's air quality automatic monitoring stations and key pollutant-discharging units have been shared online, and discussions are underway to share the data of the air "super stations" in various regions to further improve the sophistication of shared data. In addition, the three provinces and one city in the Yangtze River Delta have also signed the "Memorandum of Joint Punishment and Joint Reward for Environmental Protection Credit", which unifies the identification standards for serious corporate dishonesty and shares information and joint punishment and joint reward measures.

In October 2018, Shanghai established the Yangtze River Delta Regional Ecological Environment Cooperation Expert Committee, and the relevant ecological environment joint research center was officially established. In May 2019, the Taihu Basin Management Bureau of the Ministry of Water Resources and the water and ecological environment departments of Shanghai, Jiangsu, and Zhejiang formulated and issued the "Taihu Basin Water Environment Comprehensive Management Information Sharing Plan". Currently, the Yangtze River Delta is also preparing to build an ecological environment monitoring network covering the entire demonstration area.

In October 2020, the “Special Plan for Joint Protection of Key Cross-Border Water Bodies in the Yangtze River Delta Ecological Green Integrated Development Demonstration Zone” was announced, and Shanghai, Jiangsu, and Zhejiang will establish a joint river and lake chief mechanism to implement joint supervision of cross-border rivers and lakes.

=== Transportation ===
On May 8, 2017, Han Zheng, then member of the Politburo of the CCP and Secretary of the Shanghai Municipal Committee of the CCP, stated that “we will promote the integration of transportation in the Yangtze River Delta region and make Shanghai accessible to major cities within 90 minutes”. In May 2019, the Ministry of Transport of the People's Republic of China formulated the preliminary research results of the “Higher Quality Integrated Development Plan for Transportation in the Yangtze River Delta Region” and provided it to the National Development and Reform Commission. The “Plan” will be submitted for approval and issuance in accordance with procedures after further revision and improvement.

According to the plan, the Yangtze River Delta region will achieve integrated transportation development around rail transit, highways, ports and shipping, civil aviation, and postal services, promote the construction of a number of major transportation infrastructure projects, and strengthen cross-regional and cross-modal integrated development. Some commentators believe that the Yangtze River Delta should break administrative boundaries, strengthen various transportation links with other cities and administrative regions in the region, attach importance to the connection and transfer between urban rail transit, public transportation and other transportation systems and regional trunk networks, improve the efficient connection between large external transportation hubs such as airports and high-speed railways and urban transportation networks such as rail transit and public transportation, and improve overall efficiency and service quality.

==== Railway ====
In recent years, the Yangtze River Delta region has vigorously promoted railway construction, especially high-speed railways. High-speed railways not only shorten the time and space distance between cities and promote the integrated development of the Yangtze River Delta, but also promote the formation of a balanced regional spatial structure through the formation and development of urban agglomerations and economic axes. Although the Yangtze River Delta has a relatively wide high-speed rail network, its operating capacity is limited and the operating frequency is difficult to meet demand, so it does not have sufficient capacity to support its business.

In order to better promote the integrated development of the Yangtze River Delta, the Yangtze River Delta region is currently constructing the northern section of the Shanghe -Hangzhou High-speed Railway, the Anhui section of the Zhengfu High -speed Railway, the Xuzhou-Yancheng Railway, and the Lianyungang-Huai'an section of the Lianzhen Railway. It is also promoting the construction of 10 key projects under construction, including the Lianxu Passenger Dedicated Line, the Hefei -Anqing Passenger Dedicated Line, and the Shanghai-Nantong Railway. At the same time, it is coordinating the promotion of seven projects, including the Shanghai-Suzhou-Huzhou Railway and the Xuancheng-Jixi High-speed Railway. The national railway stations in Shanghai have also increased the number of trains to and from multiple cities in the Yangtze River Delta. The amount of investment in railway infrastructure by the Shanghai Bureau Group, the main owner of the Yangtze River Delta Railway, has ranked first among all railways since 2016.

==== Highway ====
In the early years, some roads between provinces in the Yangtze River Delta region were not interconnected, so there was a saying of "dead-end roads". In particular, there were many roads connecting Qingpu District, Shanghai, with Jiangsu and Zhejiang provinces that were not connected. For this reason, in June 2018, Shanghai, Jiangsu, Zhejiang and Anhui jointly signed the "Yangtze River Delta Region Interprovincial Dead-End Road Cooperation Framework Agreement", with the first batch of 17 interprovincial dead-end road projects being implemented. In October of the same year, Shanghai Qingpu Yingdian Road and Jiangsu Kunshan Xinle Road were connected, becoming the first interprovincial dead-end road project to be completed after the signing of the "Agreement".

As early as 2003, the Yangtze River Delta region first proposed the concept of integrated road transport cooperation. Later in 2019, Shanghai, Jiangsu, Zhejiang and Anhui also signed the "Yangtze River Delta Cooperation Agreement on Controlling Overloaded Freight Transport Vehicles" to carry out joint law enforcement; at the same time, they promoted the work of abolishing provincial highway toll stations. In terms of legal system construction, the Yangtze River Delta will also promote information interconnection and joint prevention and control of highway overload control, "two passenger and one dangerous" vehicle management, and promote the construction of a credit reporting system for the freight industry in the Yangtze River Delta region.

==== Aviation ====
According to statistics, the future aviation demand of the Yangtze River Delta urban agglomeration is expected to reach 300 million passengers. Currently, the Yangtze River Delta region is compiling a strategic plan for the coordinated development of civil aviation in the Yangtze River Delta. Nantong City plans to build a new Nantong airport in the future ; Suzhou City also plans to build a new Suzhou airport, and Jiaxing's civil-military airport is also under expansion. At the same time, the plan points out that the regional aviation hub functions of Hangzhou, Nanjing, and Hefei will be optimized and enhanced, and the construction of Suzhou Shuofang Airport in Southern Jiangsu as a regional hub airport will be supported; the construction of Huai'an air cargo hub will be accelerated.

==== Interprovincial public transportation ====
In 2010, the transportation departments of Shanghai and Jiangsu Province piloted a bus-like route between Jiading, Shanghai and Taicang, Jiangsu. According to the plan announced in 2011, the Yangtze River Delta region will open bus routes such as Shihua to Zhapu, Shihua to Pinghu, Fengjing to Jiashan, Liantang to Jiashan, Zhujiajiao to Xitang, Baoshan to Taicang, Baoshan to Kunshan, Qingpu to Kunshan, and Chongming to Qidong to facilitate public transportation for residents in the two places.

As of April 2019, the Yangtze River Delta region has opened 37 inter-provincial bus-operated passenger routes, including 13 connecting Jiangsu and Shanghai, 7 connecting Shanghai and Zhejiang, 11 connecting Jiangsu and Anhui, and 6 connecting Jiangsu and Zhejiang. In November 2019, including the two inter-provincial routes opened by Wujiang in March of that year, 5 bus routes were opened in the Yangtze River Delta Integration Demonstration Zone, uniformly named Demonstration Zone Bus. In addition, there are inter-provincial bus routes such as Jiading Route 7B, Pinghu Route 228, Baihe Route 6, and Qing'an Line.

However, there are no clear regulations on inter-provincial bus routes in the existing administrative laws and regulations. Although some routes are recognized as "inter-provincial buses" in Shanghai, their management is still based on the inter-provincial passenger transport regulations that do not allow stops along the way. Therefore, there are certain defects in industry supervision and administrative law enforcement.

In terms of inter-provincial rail transit, the Huaqiao section of Shanghai Metro Line 11, which opened at the end of 2013, is the first inter-provincial (municipal) subway line in mainland China. On June 24, 2023, Suzhou Metro Line 11 opened, connecting the two rail transit networks of Suzhou and Shanghai to better achieve the integration of the Yangtze River Delta.

==== Ticket and card interoperability ====
Starting from December 1, 2018, the Shanghai Metro, Hangzhou Metro and Ningbo Rail Transit realized the interoperability of the official client QR code for boarding. As of August 2019, the rail transit official client of Shanghai, Hangzhou, Ningbo, Wenzhou, Hefei, Nanjing, Suzhou and Wuxi have joined the Yangtze River Delta Rail Transit Boarding QR Code Interoperability Network. The rail transit official client of the above seven cities, except Shanghai, has realized the interoperability with the Shanghai Metro Boarding QR Code, while the interoperability of other cities is limited. It is expected that by the end of 2019, the rail transit QR codes of 10 cities in the Yangtze River Delta will realize interoperability.

On April 26, 2019, Shanghai Public Transport Card Company, a subsidiary of Shanghai Jiushi Group, invited citizen card and transportation card companies in Jiangsu Province and 12 cities including Nanjing, Hangzhou, Suzhou, Wuxi, Nantong, Ma'anshan, Ningbo, Shaoxing, Jiaxing, Wenzhou, Huzhou and Taizhou to discuss issuing physical and virtual card products with unified technical standards of the Ministry of Transport, so as to achieve the goal of "free travel in the Yangtze River Delta".

Starting from January 2024, Shanghai and Jiaxing will realize the interconnection of public transportation QR codes, and citizens of both cities can use the local issued QR code to travel on public transportation.

=== Healthcare ===
In 2017, Shanghai First People's Hospital, Jiangsu Provincial People's Hospital, Zhejiang Provincial People's Hospital, and Anhui Provincial Hospital (First Affiliated Hospital of USTC) jointly initiated the establishment of the "Yangtze River Delta Urban Agglomeration Hospital Collaborative Development Strategic Alliance", planning to achieve complementary and shared medical resources. As of 2018, 112 hospitals in 26 cities have joined the alliance. Prior to this, the Yangtze River Delta region had established a number of comprehensive or specialized medical alliances and was also improving its aviation rescue system. The North Branch of Ruijin Hospital, which was opened in 2013 and is located in Jiading New Town and close to Suzhou, has also attracted patients from Kunshan, Taicang and other places. At the same time, Shanghai Tongji University Affiliated Oriental Hospital established the "Yangtze River Delta Stem Cell Industry Alliance" with medical research institutes and biotechnology companies in Suzhou, Hangzhou and other places, and invited more institutions to join in promoting the establishment of national standards for stem cell preparations.

On June 8, 2018, the West Campus of Huashan Hospital Affiliated to Fudan University, the Yangtze River Delta Precision Medical Inspection Industry Platform, the Yangtze River Delta Eye Health Industry Alliance, the Yangtze River Delta Famous Doctor Studio and other cross-regional health industry projects moved into Shanghai New Hongqiao International Medical Park. In the same month, Shanghai First People's Hospital, Jiangsu Provincial People's Hospital, Zhejiang Provincial People's Hospital and Anhui Provincial Hospital signed a cooperation agreement with Tencent to jointly promote the construction of " Internet + Medical Alliance" in the Yangtze River Delta region and build an integrated online and offline medical service model. The cooperation covers the construction of information platforms such as hospital management, intelligent imaging, medical services, and cloud medical schools, involving electronic health cards, intelligent medical imaging, medical insurance payment, remote consultation and other medical service links.

On September 28, 2018, the Yangtze River Delta region piloted direct settlement of outpatient expenses for medical treatment in other places. 15 municipal hospitals in Shanghai, some community health service centers in Jinshan District and Songjiang District, as well as Nantong City, Yancheng City, Xuzhou City in Jiangsu Province, Jiaxing City, Ningbo City in Zhejiang Province, Chuzhou City, Ma'anshan City in Anhui Province and other regions became the first batch of pilot areas to realize direct settlement of outpatient expenses for medical treatment in other places. After completing the cross-provincial and cross-regional registration, insured persons can use the national unified social security card to go to medical institutions that have opened outpatient services in other places for medical treatment, and directly swipe the card to settle the payment. The treatment standards are based on the "medical treatment location directory and insurance location treatment". As of 2019, all secondary and tertiary medical institutions in Shanghai, all major medical institutions in prefecture-level cities in Jiangsu and Zhejiang provinces, and major medical institutions in four cities in Anhui Province have been included in the network coverage, totaling more than 1,300 institutions; 29 cities in the Yangtze River Delta urban agglomeration have implemented the medical insurance card system.

In December 2018, Shanghai Jiao Tong University School of Medicine Affiliated Renji Hospital Ningbo Branch (Hangzhou Bay Hospital) opened for trial operation. The hospital was jointly established by Shanghai Jiao Tong University School of Medicine Affiliated Renji Hospital, Ningbo Second Hospital and Ningbo Hangzhou Bay New Area Management Committee. The experts stationed in the hospital came from Shanghai Renji Hospital and Ningbo Second Hospital.

In May 2019, the health commissions of Shanghai, Jiangsu, Zhejiang, and Anhui jointly signed the Memorandum of Understanding on Health Cooperation. The contents of the memorandum include promoting the integration of public health, promoting the homogeneous development of medical services, deepening cooperation in innovation in traditional Chinese medicine, promoting the interconnection of health information, jointly promoting health science and technology innovation, and establishing a comprehensive law enforcement supervision linkage coordination mechanism. At the same time, the Yangtze River Delta Health Research Institute was established. On September 25, 2019, 41 cities in the Yangtze River Delta implemented the medical insurance card system, allowing citizens to pay their medical insurance accounts in real time by swiping their medical insurance cards when seeking medical treatment in other places. On January 1, 2021, the Yangtze River Delta Public Health (Internet) Radio was launched. This is the first regionalized and public health online radio station in the People's Republic of China. In December 2021, the Yangtze River Delta Medical Innovation and Development Alliance was established.

=== Education ===
As early as 2009, the heads of the education administrative departments of Shanghai, Jiangsu and Zhejiang signed the "Agreement on the Establishment of a Consultation Mechanism for the Collaborative Development of Education in the Yangtze River Delta" to establish a consultation mechanism for the collaborative development of education in the Yangtze River Delta, and to achieve educational integration in terms of sharing educational resources, exchanging educational information, and mutual recognition of non-academic education.

On December 18, 2018, at the 10th Yangtze River Delta Education Integration Development Conference, Shanghai, Jiangsu, Zhejiang, and Anhui signed the "Yangtze River Delta Region Education Higher Quality Integrated Development Strategic Cooperation Framework Agreement" and the "Yangtze River Delta Region Education Integration Development Three-Year Action Plan", which clearly stated that in the next three years, the Yangtze River Delta will take the lead in deepening cooperation in several fields such as higher education, vocational education, and teacher resources. At the same time, it will establish a number of key cooperation projects such as the Yangtze River Delta Regional Education Modernization Monitoring Center and the Yangtze River Delta Joint Vocational Education Group. Among them, the Yangtze River Delta Joint Vocational Education Group will give full play to the regional advantages of various provinces and cities to carry out staggered training of vocational education. Zhang Xueliang, professor at Shanghai University of Finance and Economics and dean of the Yangtze River Delta Integrated Development Research Institute, believes that the cooperation between local governments and university scientific research forces in the Yangtze River Delta can organize cross-departmental, cross-disciplinary, high-level theoretical research, decision-making consultation and talent training, promote the close integration of academic research and economic and social development, and introduce international high-quality scientific and educational resources to create an international education brand.

=== Travel ===
On March 21, 2018, the Yangtze River Delta Theme Park Industry Alliance was officially established with the aim of supporting the development of theme parks in the Yangtze River Delta region. Its members include 11 theme park companies, including Changzhou Dinosaur Park, Fantawild, OCT Group, and Wanda Group.

The Yangtze River Delta region has distinct Jiangnan cultural characteristics, strong complementarity of tourism resources, and frequent travel between residents. The two regions are important tourist sources and destinations for each other, and therefore have a basis for regional tourism cooperation. Since 2018, in order to achieve tourism integration, the Yangtze River Delta region has successively held tourism promotion activities and signed cooperation agreements to strengthen cross-regional tourism resource sharing and tourist exchanges.

=== Technological innovation ===
As early as 2016, Songjiang District of Shanghai established the “ Yangtze River Delta G60 Science and Technology Innovation Corridor ” named after the Shanghai-Kunming Expressway G60. In 2017, Songjiang District of Shanghai cooperated with Hangzhou and Jiaxing of Zhejiang Province to build the “Shanghai-Jiaxing-Hangzhou G60 Science and Technology Innovation Corridor” and signed the “Shanghai-Jiaxing-Hangzhou G60 Science and Technology Innovation Corridor Construction Strategic Cooperation Agreement”.

On May 21, 2018, Jiading District of Shanghai and Suzhou City of Jiangsu Province signed a strategic cooperation framework agreement to jointly establish the “Jiading-Kunming-Taitai Collaborative Innovation Core Circle” and comprehensively strengthen cooperation in six areas, including planning, science and technology innovation, industry, transportation, ecology, and people's livelihood.

On June 1, 2018, Songjiang District of Shanghai, Jiaxing, Hangzhou, Jinhua, Suzhou, Huzhou, Xuancheng, Wuhu and Hefei jointly signed the "G60 Science and Technology Innovation Corridor Strategic Cooperation Agreement" in Songjiang District of Shanghai, marking the formal establishment of a new positioning, new layout and new measures for the G60 Science and Technology Innovation Corridor. According to the agreement, the eight cities and one district will integrate the advantages of the Yangtze River Delta in all aspects and launch a series of science and technology innovation measures in accordance with the "Made in China 2025 Strategic Plan". The G60 Science and Technology Innovation Corridor will be based on seven strategic emerging industries: artificial intelligence, integrated circuits, biomedicine, high-end equipment, new energy, new materials, and new energy vehicles.

On May 28, 2019, the Yangtze River Delta G60 Science and Technology Innovation Corridor Biomedicine Industry Alliance was established in the Hangzhou Medical Port in Qiantang New District. On September 25, Shanghai Jiading, Jiangsu Suzhou, Zhejiang Wenzhou and Anhui Wuhu signed the "Strategic Agreement on Deepening the Integrated Development of Science and Technology Innovation in the Yangtze River Delta" to strengthen cooperation in the Yangtze River Delta in terms of strategic coordination, results docking, resource sharing, and ecological co-construction.

On May 27, 2021, the Yangtze River Delta integrated circuit, biomedicine, new energy vehicles, and artificial intelligence industry chain alliances were established. In addition, the Yangtze River Delta Science and Technology Innovation Community Construction Office, the Yangtze River Delta Integration Demonstration Zone New Development Construction Co., Ltd., and the Yangtze River Delta Integration Demonstration Zone Water Village Living Room Development and Construction Co., Ltd. were established. On June 3, 2021, the Yangtze River Delta National Technology Innovation Center was unveiled in Shanghai. On August 27, 2022, the Yangtze River Delta Science and Technology Innovation Community Construction Office Meeting was held in Shanghai.

=== Cultural and Sports Exchange ===
In 2018, Shanghai, Jiangsu, Zhejiang, Anhui and Shanghai Institute of Physical Education signed the "Yangtze River Delta Sports Industry Cooperation Agreement (2018-2020)", planning to implement 22 sports industry integration projects, including the development of sports characteristic towns, the creation of national sports industry bases, etc., and promote the upgrading of sports goods manufacturing industry.

On May 22, 2019, 15 media outlets in the Yangtze River Delta established the “Yangtze River Delta New Omnimedia Consortium” in Wuhu, Anhui Province, and the above 15 media outlets became the first members of the consortium. According to the plan, the consortium will regularly carry out joint interviews and establish a content cooperation and sharing platform and a new media technology cooperation and sharing platform.

=== Housing ===
On June 9, 2022, the Shanghai Housing Provident Fund Management Committee, Suzhou Housing Provident Fund Management Committee, and Jiaxing Housing Provident Fund Management Committee jointly issued the "Notice on the Pilot Program of Withdrawing Housing Provident Funds for Non-local Rentals in the Yangtze River Delta Ecological Green Integrated Development Demonstration Zone", allowing employees in the Yangtze River Delta Ecological Green Integrated Development Demonstration Zone to withdraw housing provident funds and pay for non-local rentals.
