= New productive forces =

Chinese political slogan of CCP General Secretary

New productive forces (Chinese: 新质生产力; pinyin: Xīn zhí shēngchǎnlì), also called new quality productive forces, is a political slogan promoted by the Chinese Communist Party (CCP). It was coined by CCP General Secretary Xi Jinping during a visit to Heilongjiang in 2023 to promote manufacturing and innovation in the Chinese economy.

== History ==
The term was first mentioned by CCP General Secretary Xi Jinping during an inspection trip in Heilongjiang Province in September 2023, where he called for a new economic model based on innovation in advanced sectors and for China to "lead the development of strategic emerging industries and future industries".

From 11 to 12 December 2023, during the Central Economic Work Conference, Xi said the "core of deepening supply-side structural reform is to promote industrial innovation through scientific and technological innovation, especially disruptive and cutting-edge technologies to spawn new industries, new models, new drivers, and develop new productive forces".

On 5 March 2024, on the sidelines of the second session of the 14th National People's Congress, Xi addressed deputies from Jiangsu Province, calling for local governments to develop new productive forces based on their local conditions in order prevent the formation of bubbles or adaptation of a single economic model. He also said "developing new productive forces does not mean neglecting or abandoning traditional industries" but rather to "use new technologies to transform and upgrade traditional sectors and actively promote high-end, intelligent and green industries". On the same day, the State Council listed new productive forces as a top priority in a government report.

In 2024, Xi'an University of Science and Technology established a "New Quality Productive Forces Research Center", to be led by university president Lai Xingping. From Xi's first mention of the term in September 2023 to 1 May 2024, the term appeared on Chinese academic database CNKI 1,073 times.

== Overview ==
The New York Times describes the focus on new productive forces as increasing innovation and economic growth by large investments in manufacturing, especially on high-tech and clean energy sectors, as well as more spending on research and development.

In March 2024, Xinhua News Agency said in contrast to "traditional productive forces" the new productive forces are an "advanced productivity that plays a leading role in innovation and breaks away from the traditional economic growth mode and productivity development path". It says it features "high technology, high efficiency, and high quality".

State media has used it to refer to industries ranging from tourism to the "new three"; electric vehicles, batteries and renewable energy. Xi has said the test for new productive forces will be whether they will be able to generate improvements in total factor productivity. Xi also said the new productive forces will come from the application of science and technology to production. Study Times of the Central Party School called the term as a development of the theory of the productive forces from Marxism and said it further enriches Xi Jinping Thought on Economics.
