= Zhejiang Free-Trade Zone =

Zhejiang Free-Trade Zone 中国（浙江）自由贸易试验区
- Free-Trade Zone
- Country: China
- Province: Zhejiang
- City: Zhoushan

Area
  - Total: 119.95 km^{2} (46.31 sq mi)
- Time zone: UTC+8 (China Standard)
- Website: http://www.china-zsftz.gov.cn/

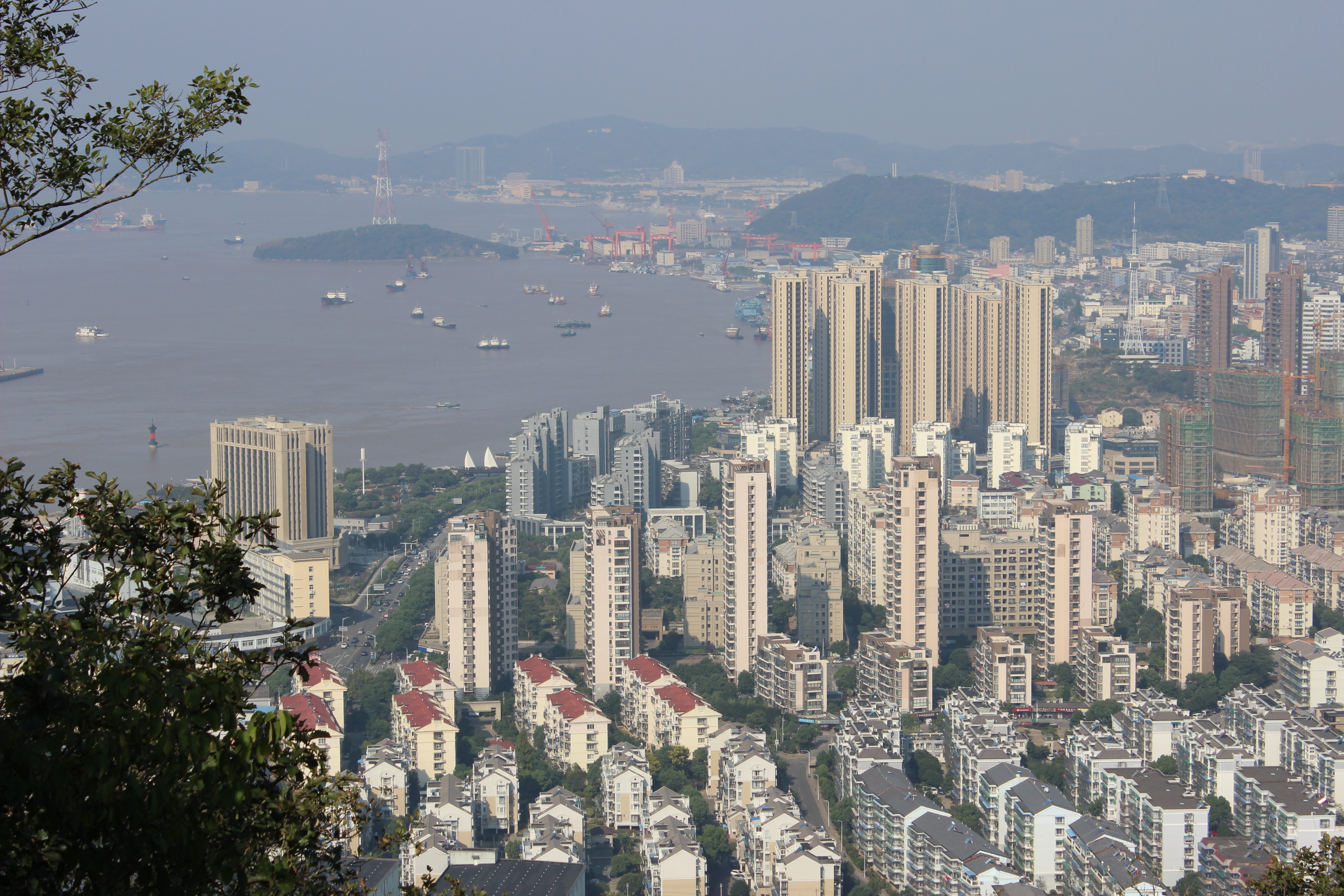
Dinghai harbor

Zhejiang Free-Trade zone, officially China (Zhejiang) Pilot Free-Trade Zone (Chinese: 中国（浙江）自由贸易试验区; pinyin: Zhōngguó (Zhèjiāng) Zìyóu Màoyì Shìyànqū) is a free-trade zone in Zhoushan, Zhejiang Province, China. Covering a total area of 119.95 square kilometres (46.31 sq mi) of land spaces and anchorage sea water, the FTZ consists of three parts - Outlying Islands Zone, Northern Zhoushan Island Zone and Southern Zhoushan Island Zone.

Established in 2014, the FTZ primarily focuses on trade of bulk commodity in eastern China, such as petroleum and oil products.
