= 12th Five-Year Plan =

Chinese economic development plan (2011–2015)

China
- 12th Five-Year Plan
- Full name: 12th Five-Year Plan for Economic and Social Development of the People's Republic of China
- Start date: 2011
- End date: 2015

Economic targets
- Average GDP growth rate: 7.89%
- GDP at start: CN¥47.310 trillion
- GDP at end: CN¥67.670 trillion
- The original text of the plan, hosted on Wikisource: 12th Five-Year Plan
← 11th	13th →

12th Five-Year Plan
- Simplified Chinese: 十二五规划
- Traditional Chinese: 十二五規劃
Transcriptions
Standard Mandarin
- Hanyu Pinyin: Shí'èrwǔ Guīhuà

12th Five-Year Plan for Economic and Social Development of the People's Republic of China
- Simplified Chinese: 中华人民共和国国民经济和社会发展第十二个五年规划纲要
- Traditional Chinese: 中華人民共和國國民經濟社會發展第十二個五年規劃綱要
Transcriptions
Standard Mandarin
- Hanyu Pinyin: Zhōnghuá Rénmín Gònghéguó Guómín Jīngjì hé Shèhuì Fāzhǎn dì Shí'èr gè Wǔ Nián Guīhuà Gāngyào

The 12th Five-Year Plan of China, officially the 12th Five-Year Plan for Economic and Social Development of the People's Republic of China, was a set of economic goals designed to strengthen the Chinese economy between 2011 and 2015. It was drafted during the fifth plenum of the 17th Central Committee of the Chinese Communist Party (CCP) held in October 2010.

== Drafting ==
The Twelfth Five-Year Guideline was debated in mid-October 2010 at the fifth plenum of the 17th Central Committee, the same session in which Xi Jinping was selected as Vice Chairman of the Central Military Commission. A full proposal for the plan was released following the plenum and approved by the National People's Congress (NPC) on 14 March 2011.

== Goals ==
The goals of the plan included addressing rising inequality and creating an environment for more sustainable growth by prioritizing more equitable wealth distribution, increased domestic consumption, and improved social infrastructure and social safety nets. Improvements in the social safety net were intended to reduce precautionary saving. The plan sought to expand the services industry in order to increase employment and continue urbanization to help raise real wages.

The plan is representative of China's efforts to rebalance its economy, shifting emphasis from investment towards consumption and development from urban and coastal areas toward rural and inland areas – initially by developing small cities and greenfield districts to absorb coastal migration. Economic rebalancing was the plan's core objective. The plan also continues to advocate objectives set out in the Eleventh Five-Year Plan to enhance environmental protection, accelerate the process of opening and reform, and emphasize Hong Kong's role as a center of international finance.

Early in the Twelfth Five-Year Plan period, Chinese policymakers concluded that the China had achieved energy intensity targets set by the Eleventh Five-Year Plan. China had also emerged as a world leader in renewable energy technology. The Twelfth Five-Year Plan targeted the use of non-fossil fuel energy sources to 11.4% of energy use over 2011–2015. The Plan also provided for the development of an ultra-high-voltage (UHV) transmission corridor to increase the integration of renewable energy from the point of generation to its point of consumption. Additionally, the Plan called for gradual implementation of a national carbon trading market in China. To facilitate carbon trading and to more broadly help assess emissions targets and meet the transparency requirements of the Paris Agreement, the Plan improved the system for greenhouse gas emissions monitoring. This was the first time that carbon emissions trading had featured in one of China's Five-Year Plans.

The plan's sustainable development section also encouraged the development of eco-cities.

== Results ==
By 2015, China had achieved the energy intensity targets set by the Twelfth Five-Year Plan for hydro power, wind power, solar power, carbon intensity, energy intensity, and non-fossil share of primary energy.

== See also ==
- Archives of Yuhuan

Preceded by 11th Plan; 2006 – 2010	12th Five-Year Plan; 2011 – 2015	Succeeded by 13th Plan; 2016 – 2020
