= 14th Five-Year Plan =

Chinese economic development plan (2021–2025)

China
- 14th Five-Year Plan
- Full name: 14th Five-Year Plan for Economic and Social Development and Long-range Objectives Through the Year 2035 of the People's Republic of China
- Start date: 2021
- End date: 2025

Economic targets
- Average GDP growth rate: 5.53%
- GDP at start: CN¥114.924 trillion
- GDP at end: CN¥140.188 trillion
- The original text of the plan, hosted on Wikisource: 14th Five-Year Plan
← 13th	15th →

14th Five-Year Plan
- Simplified Chinese: 十四五规划
- Traditional Chinese: 十四五規劃
Transcriptions
Standard Mandarin
- Hanyu Pinyin: Shísìwǔ Guīhuà

14th Five-Year Plan for Economic and Social Development and Long-range Objectives Through the Year 2035 of the People's Republic of China
- Simplified Chinese: 中华人民共和国国民经济和社会发展第十四个五年规划和2035年远景目标纲要
- Traditional Chinese: 中華人民共和國國民經濟社會發展第十四個五年計畫和2035年遠景目標綱要
Transcriptions
Standard Mandarin
- Hanyu Pinyin: Zhōnghuá Rénmín Gònghéguó Guómín Jīngjì hé Shèhuì Fāzhǎn dì Shísì gè Wǔ Nián Guīhuà hé 2035 Nián Yuǎnjǐng Mùbiāo Gāngyào

The 14th Five-Year Plan, officially the 14th Five-Year Plan for Economic and Social Development and Long-range Objectives Through the Year 2035 of the People's Republic of China, was a set of Chinese economic development goals designed to strengthen the national economy between 2021 and 2025. It was drafted during the fifth plenum of the 19th Central Committee of the Chinese Communist Party (CCP) held from 26 to 29 October 2020.

The 14th Five-Year Plan was drafted against the backdrop of worsening China–United States relations and the COVID-19 pandemic, which caused China's economy to shrink in the first quarter of 2020 – the first time in 44 years. Continuing themes from the prior two five-year plans, the 14th Five-Year Plan seeks to boost the services sector, increase urbanization and expand the social safety net to reduce precautionary savings, and also emphasizes high-tech innovation and hard science researches. To address the issue of an aging population, the 14th Five-Year Plan seeks to expand healthcare and retirement system initiatives.

== Drafting ==
On 25 November 2019, Premier Li Keqiang chaired a special meeting on the preparation of the 14th Five-Year plan. In March 2020, the drafting panel for the plan was established, with CCP General Secretary Xi Jinping as its leader and Politburo Standing Committee members Li Keqiang, Wang Huning and Han Zheng as deputy leaders.

The plan was drafted during the fifth plenum of the 19th Central Committee of the CCP held from 26 to 29 October 2020. Han Wenxiu, the deputy director of the Office of the Central Financial and Economic Affairs Commission, said Xi Jinping had personally led the drafting process through multiple meetings of the Politburo, its Standing Committee, and the drafting panel that he headed.

== Goals ==
=== Economy ===
Broadly outlined in late October 2020, the new plan aims at China becoming a "moderately developed" economy by 2035. It anticipates future growth as largely based on domestic consumption of goods and services, and aims to reduce disparities between urban and rural living standards. The plan includes the "peaceful development" of relations with Taiwan, which China considers to be its territory. The Chinese Government also wishes to continue opening up the economy, furthering the implementation of the Belt and Road Initiative.

The trade war between the United States and China caused Xi to roll out dual circulation, with "internal circulation" and "external circulation" servicing domestic and foreign trade respectively. The strategy is designed to keep China open to the world economy while increasing its self-reliance.

=== Environment ===
Economists expect the plan's target growth rate for the period to exceed five percent annually. The 2021–2025 plan is anticipated to have aggressive goals on sustainable energy to reach China's announced goals of carbon neutrality by no later than 2060.

- New Energy Technologies: Xi Jinping has announced that new energy technologies such as car batteries from state-owned enterprises will make it so that half of the vehicles in China be electric or fuel-cell powered, and half hybrid by 2035.
- Develop a plan to achieve peak carbon emissions by the end of the 2020s.
- Increase the proportion of non-fossil fuel energy use to 20% by 2025, compared to 15% at the end of 2019.
- Improve water conservation infrastructure.

=== Energy ===
The Fourteenth Five-Year Plan placed increased emphasis on the green transition as essential to China's pursuit of high-quality and sustainable growth.

Recommendations regarding the development of up to 60 gigawatts hydropower capacity on the Yarlung Tsangbo.

=== Transport ===
- Improve civil aviation, including the construction of 30 new airports.
- Completion of the "Eight Vertical and Eight Horizontal" high-speed rail network.
- Focus on improving transportation to Xinjiang and Tibet and improve international border connections.

=== Research and development ===
The plan aims to increase China's scientific and technical capabilities. China aims to make "major breakthroughs in core technologies" and to prioritize technological self-sufficiency.

The plan aims to increase R&D spending every year by 7%, with the proportion of that going to basic research increasing from 6% to more than 8%. and aid the development of real-world applications by fostering closer links between business, industry, and academia – historically such links have been weak. Businesses will be encouraged to invest in R&D through tax incentives.

The plan aimed to boost quantum information and computing, brain science, semiconductors, seed industry, genetic research, regenerative medicine, biotechnology, clinical medicine and health, and deep space, deep sea and polar exploration. The plan prioritizes development towards an integrated communications system, including earth observation and navigation satellites. Other technological areas emphasized by the plan included photonics and artificial intelligence.

The plan set the goal of building four comprehensive national science centers, to be located in Huairou, Zhangjiang, the Greater Bay Area, and Hefei.

China still is unable to independently develop advanced semiconductors that match the performance of those made in Taiwan or South Korea. Chinese officials, entrepreneurs, and academics have acknowledged this and called for increased research efforts to develop an indigenous semiconductor supply chain.

About a trillion dollars of government funding have been set aside under the technology initiative, part of which will be used by central and local governments to jointly invest in a series of third-generation chip projects, according to people with knowledge of the matter.

"For our country, technology and innovation is not just a matter of growth," Liu He told a three-story auditorium packed with China's top scientists in a separate meeting in May 2021. "It's also a matter of survival."

The government supported cultivation of small and medium enterprises (SME) in niche markets, aiming for 10,000 'little giants', which compete directly with German Mittelstand firms. By 2024, the number of designated SMEs had already far surpassed the goal.

=== Urbanization ===
The Fourteenth Five-Year Plan sets a target urbanization rate of 65%, as measured by permanent population living in cities (i.e., as opposed to hukou status).

- Lifting of restrictions on Hukou system for cities under 3 million urban residents and relax it for larger cities. All urban residents will obtain full access to basic urban public services, and rural migrants will be able to get urban residency.
- Development of clusters of large, medium-sized, and small cities.

The plan directs the development of more centralized cities and avoiding urban sprawl. The plan calls for acceleration of urban renewal to develop "human-centric cities." The plan's related Climate Change Special Plan emphasizes ecologically oriented urban planning, including through means like urban green rings, public transportation, and bicycle lanes and walking paths.

=== Security ===
The Fourteenth Five-Year Plan discusses the holistic national security approach as part of the plan's "Integrated Approach to Security and Development." It states that holistic national security "calls for the integration of national security imperatives into every aspect of national development, so as to be better able to implement our national security strategy, safeguard national security, respond effectively to both traditional and non-traditional security threats, and forestall any challenges to China's modernization." It describes the strengthening of national security as requiring a holistic examination of "political security, which is of overarching importance, the security of the people, which is the ultimate concern, and economic security, which underpins all other considerations, to military, scientific and technological, cultural, and social perspectives, which reinforce efforts in other areas."

=== Key indicators ===
Key indicators of economic and social development during the 14th Five-Year Plan period

Category	Index	Attributive	2020	2025	Annual average/cumulative
Economic development	Gross Domestic Product (GDP) growth (%)	Indicative	2.3	—	Keep within a reasonable range, and propose suggestions as appropriate each year.
Economic development	Overall labor productivity growth (%)	Indicative	2.5 (Note: Projected figure.)	—	Higher than GDP growth
Economic development	Urbanization rate of permanent residents (%)	Indicative	60.6 (Note: Figure is for 2019.)	65	—
Innovation	Growth in total social R&D expenditure (%)	Indicative	—	—	>7. Strive to increase investment intensity higher than the actual level during the "13th Five-Year Plan" period.
Innovation	Number of high-value invention patents per 10,000 people (items)	Indicative	6.3	12	—
Innovation	The proportion of added value of core digital economy industries to GDP (%)	Indicative	7.8	10	—
People's livelihood and welfare	Growth rate of per capita disposable income of residents (%)	Indicative	2.1	—	Basically in sync with GDP growth
People's livelihood and welfare	Urban surveyed unemployment rate (%)	Indicative	5.2	—	<5.5
People's livelihood and welfare	Average years of schooling for the working-age population (in years)	Binding	10.8	11.3	—
People's livelihood and welfare	Number of practicing (assistant) physicians per 1,000 people	Indicative	2.9	3.2	—
People's livelihood and welfare	Basic pension insurance participation rate (%)	Indicative	91	95	—
People's livelihood and welfare	Number of childcare facilities for children under 3 years old per 1,000 people	Indicative	1.8	4.5	—
People's livelihood and welfare	Life expectancy (years)	Indicative	77.3	—	1 (Note: Figure is cumulative over five years.)
Green Ecology	Energy consumption per unit of GDP decreased by (%)	Binding	—	—	13.5
Green Ecology	Reduction in carbon dioxide emissions per unit of GDP (%)	Binding	—	—	18
Green Ecology	Percentage of days with good or excellent air quality in prefecture-level and above cities (%)	Binding	87 (Note: In 2020, the percentage of days with good or excellent air quality, and the percentage of surface water reaching or exceeding Class III water quality in prefecture-level and above cities, were significantly higher than in normal years due to factors such as the COVID-19 pandemic.)	87.5	—
Green Ecology	The percentage of surface water that meets or exceeds Class III water quality standards (%)	Binding	83.4	85	—
Green Ecology	Forest coverage rate (%)	Binding	23.2	24.1	—
Security	Comprehensive Grain Production Capacity (100 Million Tons)	Binding	—	>6.5	—
Security	Comprehensive energy production capacity (Note: Meaning the production capacity for coal, oil, natural gas, and non-fossil energy.) (100 million tons of standard coal equivalent)	Binding	—	>46	—

Preceded by 13th Plan; 2016 – 2020	14th Five-Year Plan; 2021–2025	Succeeded by 15th Plan; 2026–2030
