= 13th Five-Year Plan =

Chinese economic development plan (2016–2020)

China
- 13th Five-Year Plan
- Full name: 13th Five-Year Plan for Economic and Social Development of the People's Republic of China
- Start date: 2016
- End date: 2020

Economic targets
- Average annual GDP growth rate: 5.73%
- GDP at start: CN¥67.671 trillion
- GDP at end: CN¥101.599 trillion
- The original text of the plan, hosted on Wikisource: 13th Five-Year Plan
← 12th	14th →

13th Five-Year Plan
- Simplified Chinese: 十三五规划
- Traditional Chinese: 十三五規劃
Transcriptions
Standard Mandarin
- Hanyu Pinyin: Shísānwǔ Guīhuà

13th Five-Year Plan for Economic and Social Development of the People's Republic of China
- Simplified Chinese: 中华人民共和国国民经济和社会发展第十三个五年规划纲要
- Traditional Chinese: 中華人民共和國國民經濟社會發展第十三個五年規劃綱要
Transcriptions
Standard Mandarin
- Hanyu Pinyin: Zhōnghuá Rénmín Gònghéguó Guómín Jīngjì hé Shèhuì Fāzhǎn dì Shísān gè Wǔ Nián Guīhuà Gāngyào

The 13th Five-Year Plan of China, officially the 13th Five-Year Plan for Economic and Social Development of the People's Republic of China, was a set of economic goals designed to strengthen the Chinese economy between 2016 and 2020.

== Content ==
The Plan increased China's target for the use of non-fossil fuel energy sources to 15% over the 2016–2020 period. It included planning to address wind energy and solar energy feed-in to the grid and prioritizing dispatch policies for renewable energy. It also required that the government develop regulations for China's carbon emissions trading system.

Continuing themes from the Twelfth Five-Year Plan, the Thirteenth Five-Year Plan also sought to boost the services sector, increase urbanization, and expand the social safety net to reduce precautionary savings.

Regarding urbanization, the Thirteenth Five-Year Plan highlighted nineteen city clusters to be developed and strengthened pursuant to a geographic layout referred to as two horizontals and three verticals (liang heng san zong). The highlighted clusters included the Beijing-Tianjin-Hebei region, the Yangtze River delta region, and the Greater Bay area. Development of these clusters includes establishing regional coordination mechanisms, sharing development costs and benefits, collaborative industrial development, and shared governance approaches to ecological issues and environmental protection.

Reducing reliance on foreign technology was a major goal of the plan.

=== Focus areas ===
- Innovation: Move up in the value chain by abandoning old heavy industry and building up bases of modern information-intensive infrastructure
- Achieve significant results in innovation-driven development
- Balancing: Bridge the welfare gaps between countryside and cities by distributing and managing resources more efficiently
- Greening: Develop environmental technology industry, as well as ecological living and ecological culture.
- Achieve an overall improvement in the quality of the environment and ecosystems
- Opening up: Deeper participation in supranational power structures, more international co-operation
- Sharing: Encourage people of China to share the fruits of economic growth, so to bridge the existing welfare gaps
- Healthcare: Implement universal healthcare proposed in 2020 Health Action Plan.
- Moderately prosperous society: Finish building a moderately prosperous society in all respects

=== Policies ===
- "Everyone is an entrepreneur, creativity of the masses" (大众创业，万众创新)
- "Made in China 2025" (中国制造2025)
  - Initiative to comprehensively upgrade Chinese industry and to obtain a bigger part of the global production chains.
  - Aims to address four worrying trends in current situation:
    1. (Nationally) vital technologies lack a (domestic) core platform
    2. Chinese industrial products are perceived internationally as inferior quality
    3. Domestic industrial competition is fierce due to overly homogeneous structure
    4. Poor conversion of academic research results to practical application
- "Economy needs a Rule of Law" (建构法制经济)
- "National defense reform"
  - Organisational reform of the army, slashing number of highest generals, as well as concentrating branches' functions, moving some under Defence Ministry
- "New national Urbanization" (国家新型城镇化)
- "Reformed one-child policy"

Preceded by 12th Plan; 2011 – 2015	13th Five-Year Plan; 2016–2020	Succeeded by 14th Plan; 2021 – 2025
