= High-quality development =

Chinese Communist Party slogan

High-quality development (Chinese: 高质量发展; pinyin: Gāo zhìliàng fāzhǎn) is a political slogan promoted by the Chinese Communist Party (CCP). It was coined by CCP General Secretary Xi Jinping at the 19th CCP National Congress in October 2017 to promote a more sustainable development of the Chinese economy.

== History ==
The term was first used by Xi Jinping at the 19th CCP National Congress in October 2017. During the meeting, he said China was transitioning away from a "high-speed growth phase" to high-quality growth.

In October 2020, the 5th Plenary Session of the 19th CCP Central Committee declared that China "has entered a stage of high-quality development." During the Central Economic Work Conference in December 2023, Xi called high-quality development the "hard truth of the new era". The 3rd plenary session of the 20th CCP Central Committee declared that high-quality development is "the top mission of building a modern socialist country".

== Content ==
The main components of high-quality development include:

1. Building a high-level socialist market economic system.
2. Building a modern industrial system.
3. Comprehensively promoting rural revitalization.
4. Promoting coordinated regional development
5. Promoting high-level opening up to the outside world.
