= Central Economic Work Conference =

Chinese annual economic conference

- Simplified Chinese: 中央经济工作会议
- Traditional Chinese: 中央經濟工作會議
Transcriptions
Standard Mandarin
- Hanyu Pinyin: Zhōngyāng Jīngjì Gōngzuò Huìyì

The Central Economic Work Conference is an annual meeting held in the People's Republic of China which sets the national agenda for the economy of China and its financial and banking sectors. It is convened jointly by the Central Committee of the Chinese Communist Party and the State Council of the People's Republic of China, following themes and keywords set by the CCP Politburo Standing Committee. As of 2012, the meetings, which are closed, were being held for 2 or 3 days during the 2nd or 3rd week of December.

== History ==
The 2012 conference was held over the weekend of December 15 and 16. It was attended by all members of the Politburo Standing Committee of the Chinese Communist Party as well as outgoing Premier Wen Jiabao. A summary of the proceedings was published by Xinhua, the official Chinese news agency. Xi Jinping, General Secretary of the Chinese Communist Party and Li Keqiang, incoming Premier of the People's Republic of China, addressed the conference. Increased urbanization was projected as a path to increasing domestic demand as a pathway to shifting emphasis to internal rather than export demand.

The keywords for the December 2012 conference were "healthy development"; in 2011 they were "steady growth". The theme healthy development reflects a change in concern from mere growth to restructuring of the economy in sustainable ways. Dealing with overreaching by "privileged people", anti-corruption efforts, was one theme expressed by official Chinese media.

The 2020 conference addressed the COVID-19 pandemic in mainland China and adherence to the 14th five-year plan (2021–2025).

== Functions ==
The conference is convened jointly by the Central Committee of the Chinese Communist Party and the State Council of the People's Republic of China. It is attended by all the members of the CCP Politburo, ministers, provincial leaders, and executives of state-owned financial and industrial enterprises. The meeting generally takes place in mid-December, after a meeting of the Politburo. It usually lasts for 2 or 3 days. After its conclusion, various government departments hold their own work conferences in December. The meeting sets the national agenda for the economy of China and its financial and banking sectors for the upcoming year.
