= Xi Jinping =

Leader of China since 2012

- 习近平
- Xi in 2026

General Secretary of the Chinese Communist Party
- Incumbent
- Assumed office 15 November 2012
- Preceded by: Hu Jintao

President of China
- Incumbent
- Assumed office 14 March 2013
- Premier: Li Keqiang (2013–2023); Li Qiang (2023–present)
- Vice President: Li Yuanchao (2013–2018); Wang Qishan (2018–2023); Han Zheng (2023–present)
- Preceded by: Hu Jintao

Chairman of the Central Military Commission
- Incumbent
- Assumed office: Party Commission: 15 November 2012; State Commission: 14 March 2013
- Deputy: Fan Changlong (2013–2018); Zhang Youxia (2018–2026); Xu Qiliang (2013–2023); He Weidong (2023–2025); Zhang Shengmin (2025–present)
- Preceded by: Hu Jintao
Other offices held
Vice President of China
In office 15 March 2008 – 14 March 2013
President	Hu Jintao
Preceded by	Zeng Qinghong
Succeeded by	Li Yuanchao
Vice Chairman of the Central Military Commission
In office: Party Commission: 18 October 2010 – 15 November 2012; State Commission: 28 October 2010 – 14 March 2013; Serving with Guo Boxiong and Xu Caihou
Chairman	Hu Jintao
Party Secretary of Shanghai
In office 24 March 2007 – 27 October 2007
Preceded by	Han Zheng
Succeeded by	Yu Zhengsheng
Party Secretary of Zhejiang
In office 24 December 2002 – 25 March 2007
Preceded by	Zhang Dejiang
Succeeded by	Zhao Hongzhu
Governor of Zhejiang
In office 12 October 2002 – 22 January 2003
Preceded by	Zeng Qinghong
Succeeded by	Li Yuanchao
Governor of Fujian
In office 9 August 1999 – 12 October 2002
Preceded by	He Guoqiang
Succeeded by	Lu Zhangong

Personal details
- Born: 15 June 1953 (age 73) Beijing, China
- Party: Communist Party of China (since 1974)
- Spouses: Ke Lingling (m. 1979; div. 1982); Peng Liyuan (m. 1987)
- Children: Xi Mingze
- Parents: Xi Zhongxun; Qi Xin
- Relatives: Xi family
- Education: Tsinghua University (BS, LLD)
- Awards: Full list
- Scientific career
- Thesis: A Tentative Study on China's Rural Marketization (2001)
- Doctoral advisor: Liu Meixun (刘美珣)
- Xi's voice Xi speaking to reporters after the First Plenary Session of the 20th Central Committee of the Chinese Communist Party; Recorded 22 October 2022

Chinese name
- Simplified Chinese: 习近平
- Traditional Chinese: 習近平
Transcriptions
Standard Mandarin
- Hanyu Pinyin: Xí Jìnpíng
- Bopomofo: ㄒㄧˊ ㄐㄧㄣˋ ㄆㄧㄥˊ
- Wade–Giles: Hsi^{2} Chin^{4}-pʻing^{2}
- MPS2: Shí Jìn-píng
- IPA: [ɕǐ tɕîn.pʰǐŋ]
Hakka
- Romanization: Sip^{6} Kiun^{4}
- Pha̍k-fa-sṳ: Si̍p Khiun-phìn
Yue: Cantonese
- Yale Romanization: Jaahp Gahn-pìhng
- Jyutping: Zaap6 Gan6-ping4
- IPA: [tsap̚˨ kɐn˨.pʰɪŋ˩]
Southern Min
- Hokkien POJ: Si̍p Kīn-pêng
- Tâi-lô: Si̍p Kīn-pîng
- Bbánlám Pìngyīm: Síp Gîn-bíng
Eastern Min
- Fuzhou BUC: Sĭk Gê̤ṳng-ping
- Central institution membership: 2007–: 17th, 18th, 19th, 20th Politburo Standing Committee; 2007–: 17th, 18th, 19th, 20th Politburo; 2007–2012: Member (first-ranked), 17th Secretariat; 2002–: Full member, 16th, 17th, 18th, 19th, 20th Central Committee; 1997–2002: Alternate member, 15th Central Committee; 1998–: Delegate, 9th, 10th, 11th, 12th, 13th, 14th National People's Congress; Leading Groups and Commissions: 2018–present: Director, Central Financial and Economic Affairs Commission; 2018–present: Director, Central Foreign Affairs Commission; 2018–2023: Director, Central Cyberspace Affairs Commission; 2018–present: Director, Central Comprehensive Law-based Governance Commission; 2018–present: Director, Central Comprehensively Deepening Reforms Commission; 2014–present: Leader, Leading Group for Defence and Military Reform; 2014–2018: Leader, Leading Group for Internet Security and Informatization; 2013–present: Chairman, National Security Commission; 2013–2018: Leader, Leading Group for Financial and Economic Affairs; 2013–2018: Leader, Central Leading Group for Comprehensively Deepening Reforms; 2012–present: Leader, Central Leading Group for Taiwan Affairs; 2012–2018: Leader, Foreign Affairs Leading Group; 2007–2012: Leader Group for Party Building; c. 2007–2012: Leader, Leading Group for Activities of Deepening the Study and Practice of the Scientific Outlook on Development; 2007–2012: Leader, Central Coordination Group for Hong Kong and Macau Affairs; Other offices held: 2016–present: Commander-in-chief, Central Military Commission Joint Operations Command Center; 2010–2013: Vice Chairman, State Central Military Commission; 2010–2012: Vice Chairman, Party Central Military Commission; 2008–2013: Vice President of China; 2007–2012: President, Central Party School; 2007: Party Committee Secretary, Shanghai municipality; 2002–2007: Party Secretary, Zhejiang province, director, Standing Committee of the Zhejiang Provincial People's Congress; 2002: Deputy Party Secretary & acting governor, Zhejiang province; 1999–2002: Governor, Fujian province; 1995–2002: Deputy Party Secretary, Fujian province; 1990–1996: Party Secretary, Fuzhou; 1990–1996: Chairman, Standing Committee of the Fuzhou Municipal People's Congress; 1988–1990: Party Secretary, Ningde; 1985–1988: Deputy Mayor, Xiamen; 1983–1985: Party Secretary, Zhengding County; Paramount Leader of the People's Republic of China: ← Hu Jintao; (Current holder)

Xi Jinping (Note: English: /ˈʃiː dʒɪnˈpɪŋ/ SHEE jin-PING, often mispronounced /ˈʒiː/ ZHEE; Chinese: 习近平; pinyin: Xí Jìnpíng, pronounced [ɕǐ tɕîn.pʰǐŋ]) (born 15 June 1953) is a Chinese politician who is the paramount leader of China. He has served as the general secretary of the Chinese Communist Party (CCP) and chairman of the Party Central Military Commission (CMC) since 2012, and as the president of China and chairman of the State Central Military Commission since 2013.

The elder son of Xi Zhongxun's second marriage to Qi Xin, Xi was born in Beijing. He is considered a princeling but kept a low-key image in his early career. As a teenager, his father was purged, and he was sent down to the rural village of Liangjiahe, Shaanxi, during the Cultural Revolution. He lived in a yaodong there, joined the CCP after several failed attempts, and served as the local party secretary. After studying chemical engineering at Tsinghua University as a worker-peasant-soldier student, Xi rose through the party ranks. He served as governor of Fujian from 1999 to 2002 before serving as governor and party secretary of Zhejiang from 2002 to 2007. Xi briefly replaced disgraced Shanghai party secretary Chen Liangyu in 2007, the same year he joined the Politburo Standing Committee and became the first-ranked member of the Secretariat. Appointed vice president in 2008 and vice chairman of the CMC in 2010, he succeeded Hu Jintao as China's leader in 2012, becoming the first paramount leader to be born after the foundation of the People's Republic of China.

Under his leadership, China adopted the Made in China 2025 policy and promoted higher-value manufacturing and efforts to reduce reliance on foreign technology. His tenure has also been characterized by a sweeping anti-corruption campaign, a restructuring of the People's Liberation Army, poverty alleviation, increased state control over the economy and society, and regulatory crackdowns on the private sector, notably in real estate, technology, and for-profit tutoring, alongside expanded censorship and mass surveillance and a deterioration in human rights. During the COVID-19 pandemic, he imposed zero-COVID policies for two years before lifting them following widespread protests.

Xi has pursued an assertive foreign policy, including toward China–United States relations, in the South China Sea, and along the Sino-Indian border dispute. He expanded China's economic and diplomatic presence in Africa and Eurasia through the Belt and Road Initiative. His 2015 meeting with Taiwanese president Ma Ying-jeou, the first between cross-strait leaders since the Chinese Civil War, was followed by deteriorating relations under the Democratic Progressive Party. He oversaw the enactment of the 2020 Hong Kong national security law, which effectively suppressed the city's pro-democracy camp. In 2018, Xi amended the constitution to remove presidential term limits and, upon his re-election in 2023, became the first Chinese president to serve more than two terms. Xi's ideology, known as Xi Jinping Thought, has been incorporated into the party and national constitutions.

== Early life and education ==
Xi Jinping was born on 15 June 1953 in Beijing as the third child of Xi Zhongxun and his second wife Qi Xin. A Chinese Communist Party (CCP) revolutionary, Xi's father held a series of posts after the founding of the People's Republic of China in 1949, including head of the Party Publicity Department, vice premier, and vice chairperson of the Standing Committee of the National People's Congress. Xi has two older sisters, Qi Qiaoqiao, born in 1949, and Qi An'an (齐安安), born in 1952. Xi's father was from Fuping County, Shaanxi.

Xi went to Beijing Bayi School, where students were primarily the children of high-ranking military officials. In 1963, when Xi was ten years old, his father was purged from the CCP and sent to work in a factory in Luoyang, Henan. Following the start of the Cultural Revolution in 1966, Xi was persecuted due to his father's status. Student militants ransacked the Xi family home. His mother was forced to publicly denounce his father, as he was paraded before a crowd as an enemy of the revolution. After the Bayi School closed down in 1967, Xi was transferred to the Beijing No. 25 School. In 1968, when Xi was aged 15, his father was imprisoned. Xi left Beijing and arrived in Liangjiahe Village, Yan'an, Shaanxi in the Down to the Countryside Movement. At the time, Yan'an was one of the poorest places in the country. After a few months, unable to stand rural life, he ran away to Beijing. He was arrested during a crackdown on deserters from the countryside and sent to a work camp to dig ditches. He later returned to the village under the persuasion of his aunt Qi Yun and uncle Wei Zhenwu.

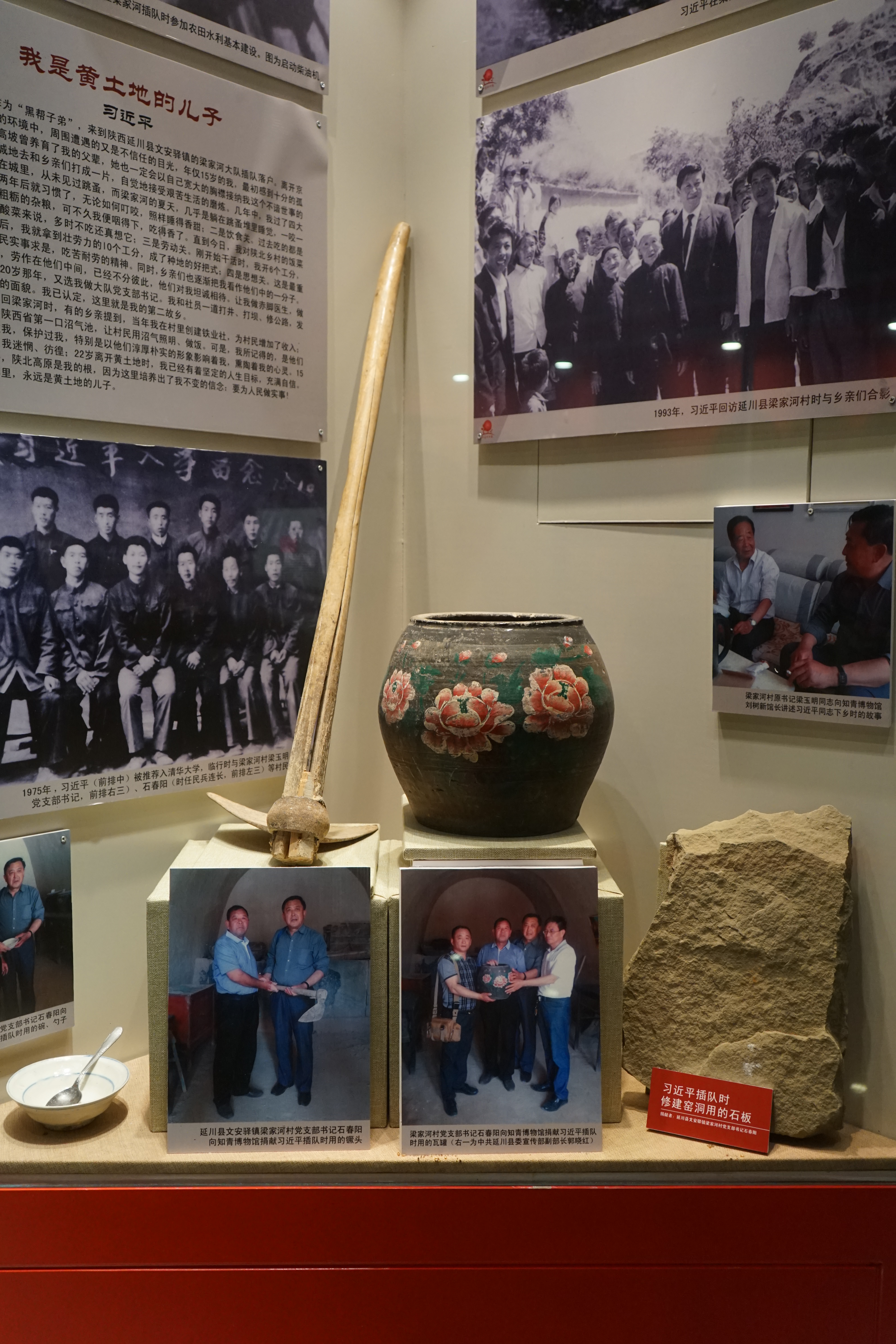
Items used by Xi during his time working in the countryside in Liangjiahe

He then spent a total of seven years in Liangjiahe, where he lived in a yaodong, a type of cave house found in northern China. During his time in Liangjiahe, Xi's half-sister Heping hanged herself at her military academy. In 1973, Yanchuan County assigned Xi to Zhaojiahe Village in the Jiajianping Commune to lead social education efforts. Due to his effective work and strong rapport with the villagers, the community expressed a desire to keep him. However, after Liangjiahe Village advocated for his return, Xi was sent back there. The village branch secretaries supported his application to the CCP. Yet, due to his father Xi Zhongxun still facing political persecution, the application was initially denied by the higher authorities. According to one account, Xi applied for CCP membership twice; his first application was rejected due to his father's status, but the second time, due to a new policy of not judging offsprings due to their parents, the application was approved. Around that time, as the Liangjiahe village underwent leadership changes, Xi was recommended to become the Party branch chairman of the Liangjiahe Brigade, later taking office. In 1975, when the Yan'an region was allocated two spots at Tsinghua University, Xi applied to the university in all three of his allowable choices. From 1975 to 1979, Xi studied chemical engineering at Tsinghua University as a worker-peasant-soldier student in Beijing.

== Early political career ==
=== Central Military Commission ===
After graduating in April 1979, Xi worked at the General Office of the State Council as one of the three secretaries of Geng Biao, who was the secretary-general of the Central Military Commission. As part of his job, Xi participated in central meetings and decision-making, dealt with regional and foreign affairs, and became familiar with the handling of central documents, including confidential ones. Xi worked to inspect the armed forces, draft documents, and oversee Hong Kong, Macau, and Taiwan affairs together with Geng.

=== Hebei ===
In March 1982, Xi was appointed deputy party secretary of Zhengding County in Hebei. Together with Lü Yulan, the other deputy party secretary of Zhengding, Xi wrote a letter to the central government addressing the excessive requisitions that burdened local farmers. Their efforts successfully convinced the central government to reduce the annual requisition amount by 14 million kilograms. Xi also set up a pilot project for the household responsibility system in one of the poorer communes despite reservations from some in the local leadership.

As the secretary of the CCP Zhengding County Committee in July 1983, Xi initiated several development projects, including the development of "Nine Articles of Zhengding talents", the construction of Changshan Park, the restoration of the Longxing Temple, the formation of a tourism company, and the establishment of the Rongguo Mansion and Zhengding Table Tennis Base. He also persuaded the China Teleplay Production Center to set the filming base of Dream of the Red Chamber in Zhengding and secured 3.5 million yuan to build Rongguo Mansion, which significantly boosted the county's tourism industry, generating 17.61 million yuan in revenue that year. Additionally, Xi invited prominent figures such as Hua Luogeng, Yu Guangyuan, Pan Chengxiao to visit Zhengding, which eventually led to the development of the county's "semi-urban" strategy, leveraging its proximity to Shijiazhuang for diverse business growth.

In September 1984, during a briefing session chaired by He Zai, the secretary-general of the CCP Central Organization Department, Xi's strategic vision and comprehensive understanding of Zhengding County's development were highlighted. He Zai, along with Wei Jianxing, deputy head of the CCP Central Organization Department, communicated these findings to Hu Yaobang, describing Xi as a leader with a strategic outlook and a strong alliance ideology between workers and peasants. In 1985, Xi participated in a study tour on corn processing and traveled to Iowa, the United States, to study agricultural production and corn processing technology. During his visit to the U.S., the CCP Central Organization Department decided to transfer him to Xiamen as a member of the Standing Committee of the CCP Xiamen Municipal Committee and as vice mayor.

=== Fujian ===
Arriving in Xiamen as vice mayor in June 1985, Xi drafted the first strategic plan for the development of the city, the Xiamen Economic and Social Development Strategy for 1985–2000. From August, he oversaw the resolution for Yundang Lake's comprehensive treatments, and prepared Xiamen Airlines, the Xiamen Economic Information Center, and the Xiamen Special Administrative Region Road Project. He then married Peng Liyuan in Xiamen. In September 1988, he was appointed as the secretary of Ningde before being elevated to head of the region. Ningde's economy was far worse at that time than that of Fuzhou and Xiamen. Xi condensed his work log and memories of his Ningde period into the book Getting out of Poverty, and led local poverty eradicating efforts and local CCP building projects. The CCP Fujian Provincial Committee decided in May 1990 to assign Xi to Fuzhou City as the Municipal Committee Secretary. In 1995, Xi Jinping was elevated to deputy secretary of the Fujian Provincial Committee of the Chinese Communist Party.

In September 1997, he was elected as an alternate member of the 15th CCP Central Committee by the 15th Party National Congress. In 1998, he became a member of the 9th National People's Congress. In 1999, he was promoted to the office of Vice Governor of Fujian, and became governor a year later. Xi proposed the concept of the Golden Triangle at Min River and oversaw the construction of the Fuzhou 3820 Project Master Plan, which outlines Fuzhou's growth strategy for 3, 8, and 20 years. He also championed the development of Fuzhou Changle International Airport, the Min River Water Transfer Project, the Fuzhou Telecommunication Hub, and Fuzhou Port, among others. He also focused on attracting Taiwanese and foreign investment, establishing Southwest TPV Electronics and Southeast Automobile in Fuzhou, and fostering Fuyao Glass, Newland Digital Technology and other manufacturing firms. He served as governor of Fujian from 1999 to 2002, during which he presented the notion of "Megalopolises" and advocated for the inter-island growth strategy of Fuzhou and Xiamen, which motivated local officials to swiftly overcome the repercussions of the Yuanhua smuggling case (Chinese: 远华走私案) and adopt a new development strategy. Xi also oversaw the development of "Digital Fujian", including the province's complaint hotline into the "12345 Citizen Service Platform", so enhancing organizational efficiency.

=== Zhejiang ===
In October 2002, Xi left Fujian and became the deputy governor, acting governor and deputy Party secretary of neighbouring Zhejiang. He eventually took over as provincial Party Committee secretary after the 16th Party National Congress, occupying a top provincial office for the first time in his career. In November 2002, he was elected a full member of the 16th Central Committee by the 16th Party National Congress, marking his ascension to the national stage. While in Zhejiang, Xi presided over reported growth rates averaging 14% per year. During this period, Zhejiang increasingly transitioned away from heavy industry. Xi's career in Zhejiang was marked by a tough and straightforward stance against corrupt officials. This earned him a name in the national media and drew the attention of China's top leaders. Between 2004 and 2007, Li Qiang acted as Xi's chief of staff through his position as secretary-general of the Zhejiang Party Committee, where they developed close mutual ties. During this period, Xi and Li drafted the Double Eight Strategy, which listed eight comparative advantages of Zhejiang and eight corresponding actions to improve the province.

=== Shanghai ===
Following the dismissal of Shanghai Party secretary Chen Liangyu in September 2006 due to a social security fund scandal, Xi was transferred to Shanghai on 24 March 2007, where he was the party secretary there for seven months. While in Shanghai, he worked on preserving unity of the local party organisation. He pledged there would be no purges during his administration, despite the fact many local officials were thought to have been implicated in the Chen Liangyu corruption scandal. In Shanghai, Xi was known for supporting market based reforms. On most issues, Xi largely echoed the line of the central leadership. He developed a reputation in his early career for avoiding controversy and not making political opponents.

=== Vice presidency ===
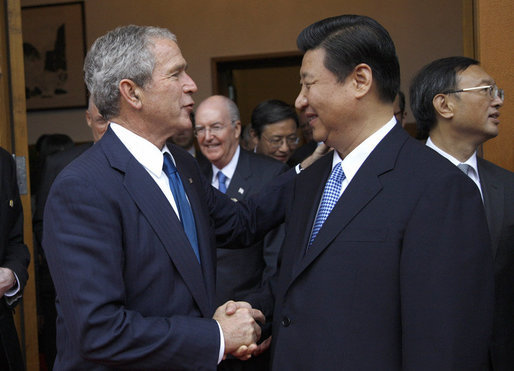
Xi greeting U.S. president George W. Bush in August 2008

Immediately after the 17th Party National Congress, Xi was elected by the first plenary session of the 17th Central Committee to be the 6th-ranking member of the Politburo Standing Committee on 22 October 2007. In addition, Xi became the first-ranking member of the 17th Secretariat. He also led the Central Leading Group for Party Building and the Central Hong Kong and Macau Affairs Leading Group, as well as being the deputy leader of the Central Foreign Affairs Leading Group. He was ranked above Li Keqiang in the PSC, an indication that he was going to succeed Hu Jintao as China's next leader. This assessment was further supported at the first session of the 11th National People's Congress in March 2008, when Xi was elected as vice president of China.

Following his elevation, Xi held a broad range of portfolios. He was put in charge of the comprehensive preparations for the 2008 Summer Olympics in Beijing, as well as being the central government's leading figure in Hong Kong and Macau affairs. In addition, he also became the president of the Central Party School, the CCP's cadre-training and ideological education school. In the wake of the 2008 Sichuan earthquake, Xi visited Shaanxi, which was also hit by the earthquake. After the Olympics, Xi was assigned the post of committee chair for the preparations of celebrations for the 60th anniversary of the People's Republic of China. He was also reportedly at the helm of a top-level CCP committee dubbed the 6521 Project, which was charged with ensuring social stability during a series of politically sensitive anniversaries in 2009. Following the July 2009 Ürümqi riots, Xi was put in charge to restore order, aided by security chief Zhou Yongkang. Xi also took active part in diplomacy, visiting various countries as vice president.

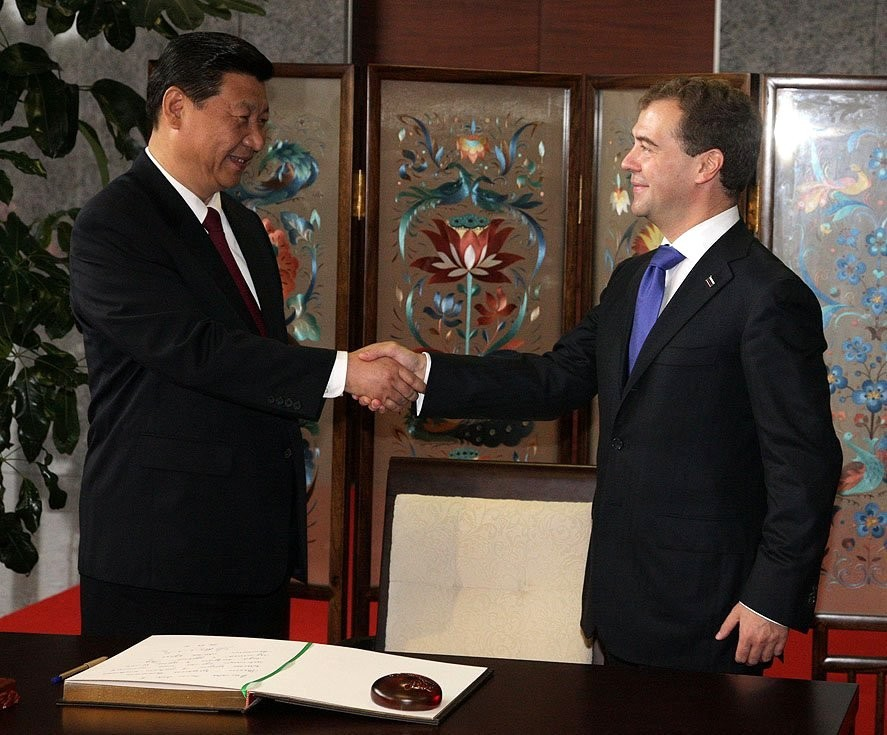
Xi with Russian president Dmitry Medvedev on 28 September 2010

Xi's position as the apparent successor to become the paramount leader was threatened with the rapid rise of Bo Xilai, the party secretary of Chongqing at the time. Bo was expected to join the PSC after the 18th Party Congress, with most expecting that he would try to eventually maneuver himself into replacing Xi. Bo's policies in Chongqing inspired imitations throughout China and received praise from Xi himself during Xi's visit to Chongqing in 2010. Records of praises from Xi were later erased after he became paramount leader. Bo's downfall would come with the Wang Lijun incident, which opened the door for Xi to come to power without challengers. On 18 October 2010, at the fifth plenary session of the 17th Central Committee, Xi was elected to be a vice chairman of the CCP Central Military Commission, followed by his appointment as vice chairman of the state CMC on 28 October by the Standing Committee of the National People's Congress.

A few months before his ascendancy to the party leadership, Xi disappeared from official media coverage and cancelled meetings with foreign officials for several weeks beginning on 1 September 2012, causing rumors. He then reappeared on 15 September. On 15 November 2012, immediately after the 18th Party National Congress, Xi was elected by the first plenary session the 18th Central Committee to the posts of Party general secretary and chairman of the Party CMC. This made him both the CCP leader and, informally, China's paramount leader. The following day Xi led the new line-up of the PSC onto the stage in their first public appearance. The membership of the PSC was reduced from nine to seven, with Xi and Li Keqiang retaining their seats; the other five members were new. In December 2012, Xi visited Guangdong in his first trip outside Beijing since taking the general secretaryship. The overarching theme of the trip was to call for further economic reform and a strengthened military. Xi was elected president on 14 March 2013, in a confirmation vote during the first session of the 12th National People's Congress in Beijing. He received 2,952 for, one vote against, and three abstentions. He replaced Hu Jintao, who retired after serving two terms. Xi was also elected as the chairman of the state CMC. He subsequently nominated Li Keqiang to be the premier, who was then appointed by the NPC.

== Leadership ==
=== Political developments ===
Political observers have called Xi the most powerful Chinese leader since Chairman Mao Zedong, especially since the ending of presidential two-term limits in 2018. Xi has departed from the CCP's previous collective leadership practices. Observers have said that Xi has seriously diluted the influence of the once-dominant Tuanpai, also called the Youth League Faction, which were CCP officials who rose through the Communist Youth League (CYLC). Xi has had a cult of personality constructed around himself since entering office with books, cartoons, pop songs and dance routines honouring his rule. Xi's cult of personality has been especially pronounced in Xinjiang. In 2016, the sixth plenary session of the 18th Central Committee officially announced Xi as the leadership core, making him the fourth leader to have been given this designation after Mao Zedong, Deng Xiaoping and Jiang Zemin; Hu Jintao was never given this designation.

Xi and other members of the new 20th Politburo Standing Committee meeting the press following Xi's re-election as general secretary in October 2022

Xi was re-elected as general secretary and CMC chairman by the 19th Central Committee after the 19th Party National Congress, held between 18 and 24 October 2017; the 19th Politburo was noted for containing no potential successor. In March 2018, the first session of the 13th National People's Congress passed constitutional amendments including removal of term limits for the president and vice president, the creation of a National Supervisory Commission, as well as codifying the leading role of the CCP. Xi was reappointed as president, now without term limits, while Li Keqiang was reappointed premier. In its sixth plenary session in November 2021, the 19th Central Committee adopted the Resolution on the Major Achievements and Historical Experience of the Party over the Past Century, which evaluated the party's historical legacy from its foundation in 1921 until its 100th anniversary in 2021. The third historical resolution after the ones adopted by Mao and Deng, Xi's one did not herald a major change in how the CCP evaluated its history in comparison. To accompany the resolution, the CCP promoted the terms Two Establishments and Two Upholds, calling the CCP to unite around and protect Xi's core status within the party.

The 20th Party National Congress, held between 16 and 22 October 2022, has overseen amendments in the CCP constitution, with the overall result of the Congress further strengthening Xi's power. Xi was subsequently re-elected as general secretary of the CCP and chairman of the CMC for a third term during the first plenary session of the 20th Central Committee held on 23 October 2022, held immediately after the Party Congress. Xi's re-election made him the first party leader since Mao Zedong to be chosen for a third term. The new Politburo Standing Committee elected by the Central Committee was filled almost completely with people close to Xi, with four out of the seven members of the previous PSC stepping down. Xi was unanimously re-elected as the president and chairman of the PRC Central Military Commission on 10 March 2023 during the first session of the 14th National People's Congress. At the same time, Xi ally Li Qiang succeeded Li Keqiang as the Premier.

=== Anti-corruption campaign ===
"To speak the truth" means to focus on the nature of things, to speak frankly, and follow the truth. This is an important embodiment of a leading official's characteristics of truth seeking, embodying justice, devotion to public interests, and uprightness. Moreover, he highlighted that the premise of telling the truth is to listen to the truth.

— Xi Jinping during a speech in 2012

Xi called for a crackdown on corruption immediately after he ascended to power, starting an anti-corruption campaign. In his inaugural speech as general secretary, Xi mentioned that fighting corruption was one of the toughest challenges for the party. A few months into his term, Xi outlined the Eight-point Regulation, listing rules intended to curb corruption and waste during official party business; it aimed at stricter discipline on the conduct of officials. Xi vowed to root out "tigers and flies", that is, high-ranking officials and ordinary party functionaries. He also launched the Party's Mass Line Education and Practice Activities, guiding CCP cadres to use mass line and instill Party discipline. The campaign lasted from 2013 to 2014.

Xi's anti-corruption campaign has led to the downfall of prominent incumbent and retired CCP officials, including members of the PSC. Xi initiated cases against former CMC vice chairmen Xu Caihou and Guo Boxiong, former PSC member and security chief Zhou Yongkang and former CCP General Office director Ling Jihua. Xi has overseen significant reforms of the Central Commission for Discipline Inspection (CCDI), CCP's highest internal control institution. He and CCDI Secretary Wang Qishan further institutionalized CCDI's independence from the day-to-day operations of the CCP, improving its ability to function as a bona fide control body. Along with Wang Qishan, Xi's administration spearheaded the formation of "centrally-dispatched inspection teams". These were cross-jurisdictional squads whose task was to gain an understanding of the operations of provincial and local party organizations and enforce party discipline mandated by Beijing. Work teams had the effect of identifying and initiating investigations of high-ranking officials. Over one hundred provincial-ministerial level officials were implicated during a nationwide anti-corruption campaign. These included former and current regional officials, leading figures of state-owned enterprises and central government organs, and generals. Within the first two years of the campaign alone, over 200,000 officials received warnings, fines, and demotions. As of 2023, approximately 2.3 million government officials have been prosecuted.

According to The Wall Street Journal, anti-corruption punishment to officials at or above the vice ministerial level need approval from Xi. In 2017, the campaign led to the downfall of Chongqing Party Secretary and Politburo member Sun Zhengcai. In March 2018, the National Supervisory Commission was established as the highest state supervisory and anti-corruption authority in an effort to aid the CCDI. In January 2018, Xi launched a three-year Special Campaign to Crack Down on Organized Crime and Eliminate Evil that lasted until 2020. After the special campaign exposed problems in the legal system, the CCP announced a campaign to educate and rectify the political and legal teams in July 2020. Especially since 2023, Xi has also overseen significant anti-corruption efforts in the military, with some targets involving those that rose to prominence under his leadership. Those targeted included former defense ministers Li Shangfu and Wei Fenghe, CMC vice chairmen He Weidong and Zhang Youxia, and CMC member Miao Hua. In addition, former Xinjiang Party Secretary and Politburo member Ma Xingrui was put under investigation in 2026. Bloomberg News estimated that as October 2025, at least 14 generals out of 79 appointed under Xi's leadership have been ousted. Xi has introduced stringent restrictions on naked officials, CCP officials with spouses or children residing abroad, eventually culminating in a 2025 campaign to require cadres of vice-ministerial rank or above being required to either repatriate family members or resign from office.

=== Media and censorship ===
Since Xi became general secretary, censorship has stepped up. Xi has overseen the increased coordination and consolidation of censorship authorities, raising their efficiency, and under his leadership censorship practices have tightened. Xi has called on for more positive energy at Chinese media, referring to the need for uplifting messages as opposed to critical or negative ones. In August 2013, he gave what became known as the August 19 speech, emphasizing the guiding role of ideology in propaganda. At the Symposium on News Reporting and Public Opinion in 2016, Xi stated that "party and government-owned media must hold the family name of the party" and that the state media "must embody the party's will, safeguard the party's authority".

Xi's administration has overseen more Internet restrictions imposed, and is described as being "stricter across the board" on speech than previous administrations. In 2013, the State Internet Information Office summoned influential bloggers to a seminar to instruct them to avoid writing about politics, the CCP, or making statements contradicting official narratives. Many bloggers stopped writing about controversial topics, and Weibo went into decline, with much of its readership shifting to WeChat users speaking to limited social circles. The SIIO also formulated the Seven Bottom Lines, which serve as the bottom lines that internet users and social media companies in China must adhere to. In September 2013, the Supreme People's Court authorized a three-year prison term for bloggers who shared more than 500 times any content considered "defamatory".

In 2014, the Chinese government launched the Cleaning the Web campaign, aiming to crack down on pornographic, vulgar, and politically questionable content. It also launched Operation Qinglang campaigns since 2016 to "clean up" the Chinese internet. China under Xi has taken a strong stand to control internet usage inside China, including Google, Facebook and Wikipedia, advocating Internet censorship under the concept of internet sovereignty. Likewise, the situation for users of Weibo has been described as a change from fearing one's account would be deleted, to fear of arrest. The Provisions on the Governance of the Online Information Content Ecosystem, which came into effect in 2020, defined the scope of legal expression for service platforms and content creators. Under Xi's administration, China started enforcing an Internet real-name system for online platforms, requiring them to collect users' real names, ID numbers, and other information when providing services.

=== Reforms ===
In November 2013, at the conclusion of the third plenum of the 18th Central Committee, the Communist Party adopted the Decision on Several Major Issues Concerning Comprehensively Deepening Reform, a far-reaching reform agenda that alluded to changes in both economic and social policy. Xi signaled at the plenum that he was consolidating control of the massive internal security organization that was formerly the domain of Zhou Yongkang. The Central Leading Group for Comprehensively Deepening Reforms—another ad hoc policy coordination body led by Xi upgraded to a commission in 2018—was also formed to oversee the implementation of the reform agenda. Termed "comprehensive deepening reforms", they were said to be the most significant since Deng Xiaoping's 1992 Southern Tour. The plenum also announced economic reforms and resolved to abolish the laogai system of "re-education through labour", which was largely seen as a blot on China's human rights record. The system has faced significant criticism for years from domestic critics and foreign observers.

In 2015, Xi announced the Four Comprehensives, namely comprehensively build a moderately prosperous society, deepening reform, governing the nation according to law, and strictly governing the Party; in 2021, at the 100th anniversary of the CCP, Xi declared that China achieved its goal of building a moderately prosperous society in all respects. In January 2016, a two-child policy replaced the one-child policy, which was in turn was replaced with a three-child policy in May 2021. In July 2021, all family size limits as well as penalties for exceeding them were removed. Since abandoning population control restrictions, China has pursued pro-natalist policies in an attempt to boost the birth rate.

==== Political reforms ====
The most essential feature of socialism with Chinese characteristics is the leadership of the Communist Party of China. The greatest advantage of the socialist system with Chinese characteristics is the leadership of the Communist Party of China, and the party is the highest political leading force.

— Xi Jinping during a speech in June 2018

Xi's administration enacted a number of changes to the structure of the CCP and state bodies, especially in a large overhaul in 2018. These reforms have been characterized by the integration of CCP and state bodies. Beginning in 2013, the CCP under Xi has created a series of Central Leading Groups: supra-ministerial steering committees, designed to bypass existing institutions when making decisions, and ostensibly make policy-making a more efficient process. Xi was also believed to have diluted the authority of premier Li Keqiang, taking authority over the economy which has generally been considered to be the domain of the premier. February 2014 oversaw the creation of the Central Leading Group for Cybersecurity and Informatization with Xi as its leader. The State Internet Information Office (SIIO), previously under the State Council Information Office (SCIO), was transferred to the central leading group and renamed in English into the Cyberspace Administration of China. As part of managing the financial system, the Financial Stability and Development Committee, a State Council body, was established in 2017. Chaired by vice premier Liu He during its existence, the committee was disestablished by the newly established Central Financial Commission during the 2023 Party and state reforms. Xi has increased the role of the Central Financial and Economic Affairs Commission at the expense of the State Council.

2018 has seen the deepening the reform of the Party and state institutions. In that year, several central leading groups including reform, cyberspace affairs, finance and economics, and foreign affairs were upgraded to commissions. The powers of the Central Publicity Department was strengthened, which now oversaw the newly established China Media Group (CMG). Two State Council departments. one dealing with overseas Chinese, and other one dealing with religious affairs, were merged into the United Front Work Department of the CCP while another commission dealing with ethnic affairs was brought under formal UFWD leadership. In 2020, all elections at all levels of the people's congress system and NPC were mandated to adhere to the leadership of the CCP. 2023 has seen further reforms to the CCP and state bureaucracy called the plan on reforming Party and state institutions, which included the strengthening of Party control over the financial and technology domains. This included the creation of two CCP bodies for overseeing finance; the Central Financial Commission (CFC), as well as the revival of the Central Financial Work Commission (CFWC) that was previously dissolved in 2002. Additionally, a new CCP Central Science and Technology Commission would be established to broadly oversee the technology sector, while a newly created Society Work Department was tasked with CCP interactions with several sectors, including civic groups, chambers of commerce and industry groups, as well as handling public petition and grievance work. Regulatory bodies saw large overhauls. Several regulatory responsibilities were also transferred from the People's Bank of China (PBC) to another regulatory body, while the PBC reopened offices around the country that were closed in a previous reorganization. In 2024, the CCP's role was strengthened further with the Organic Law of the State Council amended to add a clause about following CCP ideology and policies.

==== Legal reforms ====
Efforts should be made to enable the people to see that justice is served in every judicial case.

— Xi Jinping during a speech in November 2020

The party under Xi announced a raft of legal reforms at the fourth plenum held in the fall 2014, and he called for "Chinese socialistic rule of law" immediately afterwards. The party aimed to reform the legal system, which had been perceived as ineffective at delivering justice and affected by corruption, local government interference and lack of constitutional oversight. The plenum, while emphasizing the absolute leadership of the party, also called for a greater role of the constitution in the affairs of state and a strengthening of the role of the National People's Congress Standing Committee in interpreting the constitution. It also called for more transparency in legal proceedings, more involvement of ordinary citizens in the legislative process, and an overall "professionalization" of the legal workforce. The party also planned to institute cross-jurisdictional circuit legal tribunals as well as giving provinces consolidated administrative oversight over lower level legal resources, which is intended to reduce local government involvement in legal proceedings.

There have been several reforms to the court system under Xi, including transferring the authority over local court finance and personnel from local governments to the provincial-level, establishing a personnel quota system, emphasizing "lifetime accountability" for judges for their judicial decisions, and specification of case transferring procedures between various courts. In 2014, China started efforts to pass a unified Civil Code, which was eventually adopted in 2020. In 2015, Xi's administration oversaw the establishment of two circuit courts under the Supreme People's Court, followed by four other circuit courts being established in 2016. Hangzhou Internet Court was established as a court of special jurisdiction in 2017, followed by the establishment of Beijing Internet Court and Guangzhou Internet Court. Shanghai Financial Court was established in 2018 as a specialized financial court. Under Xi, an increasing share of laws passed by the NPC explicitly affirmed the leadership of the CCP, with the share increasing from 4% in 2018 to nearly 70% in 2024.

==== Military reforms ====
In the USSR, where the military was depoliticized, separated from the party and nationalized, the party was disarmed. When the Soviet Union came to crisis point, a big party was gone just like that. Proportionally, the Soviet Communist Party had more members than we do, but nobody was man enough to stand up and resist.

— Xi Jinping during a speech

Since taking power in 2012, Xi has undertaken an overhaul of the People's Liberation Army, including both political reform and its modernization. Military-civil fusion has advanced under Xi. Xi has been active in his participation in military affairs, taking a direct hands-on approach to military reform. In addition to being the chairman of the CMC and leader of the Central Leading Group for Military Reform founded in 2014 to oversee comprehensive military reforms, Xi has delivered numerous high-profile pronouncements vowing to clean up malfeasance and complacency in the military. Xi has repeatedly warned that the depoliticization of the PLA from the CCP would lead to a collapse similar to that of the Soviet Union. Xi held the New Gutian Conference in 2014, gathering China's top military officers, re-emphasizing the principle of "the party has absolute control over the army" first established by Mao at the 1929 Gutian Congress. Xi's tenure saw an emphasis on the chairman responsibility system, highlighting the CMC chairman's absolute leadership over the Central Military Commission and the military.

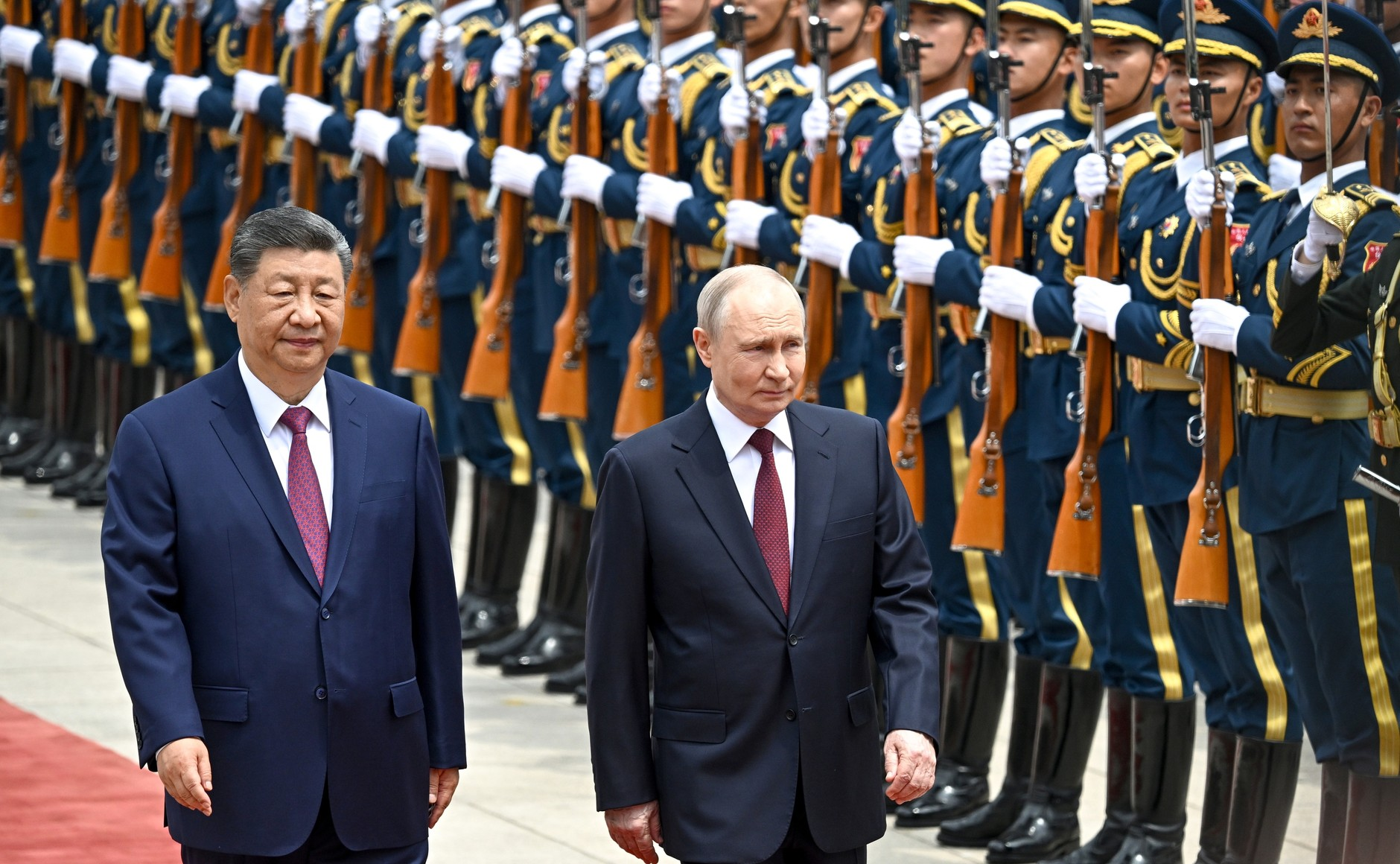
Xi and Russian president Vladimir Putin reviewing People's Liberation Army troops during a welcome ceremony in Beijing, 20 May 2026

At the 2015 China Victory Day Parade, Xi announced a reduction of 300,000 troops from the PLA, bringing its size to 2 million troops. Xi described this as a gesture of peace, while analysts have said that the cut was done to reduce costs as well as to modernize the PLA. In November 2015, the Central Leading Group for Military Reform announced extensive reforms in the PLA called Deepening National Defense and Military Reform. In 2016, Xi reduced the number of theater commands of the PLA from seven to five. He also abolished the four autonomous general departments of the PLA, replacing them with 15 agencies directly reporting to the CMC. Two new branches of the PLA were created under his reforms, the Strategic Support Force and the Joint Logistics Support Force. PLA Second Artillery Corps was upgraded to the PLA Rocket Force. In March 2016, the CMC announced the abolishment of paid services by the PLA and the People's Armed Police (PAP) by 2019, meaning activities like military-run hospitals and hotels open to the public. On 21 April 2016, Xi was named commander-in-chief of the country's new CMC Joint Operations Command Center. In 2018, the PAP was placed under the sole control of the CMC; it was previously under the joint command of the CMC and the State Council through the Ministry of Public Security. The PLA went through further extensive reforms in 2024; the Strategic Support Force was dissolved and the Aerospace Force, the Cyberspace Force and the Information Support Force was established as arms of the PLA, joining the Joint Logistics Support Force.

Under Xi, China's official military budget has more than doubled, reaching a record $282 billion in 2026. Though predating Xi, his administration has taken a more assertive stance towards maritime affairs, and has boosted CCP control over the maritime security forces. The PLA Navy has grown rapidly under Xi, with China adding more warships, submarines, support ships and major amphibious vessels from 2014 to 2019 than the entire number of ships serving in the United Kingdom's fleet. Aircraft carriers Shandong and Fujian entered into service under Xi in 2019 and 2025 respectively. In 2017, China established the navy's first overseas base in Djibouti. Xi has also undertaken an expansion of China's nuclear arsenal, with him calling China to "establish a strong system of strategic deterrence." The Federation of American Scientists (FAS) has estimated China's total nuclear arsenal to be 600 in 2025, with the US Department of Defense estimating that China's arsenal could reach 1,000 by 2030.

=== Economy and technology ===
The Decision of the third plenary session of the 18th Central Committee announced "market forces" would begin to play a "decisive" role in allocating resources. This meant that the state would gradually reduce its involvement in the distribution of capital, and restructure state-owned enterprises (SOEs) to allow further competition, potentially by attracting foreign and private sector players in industries previously highly regulated. This policy aimed to address the bloated state sector that had unduly profited from re-structuring by purchasing assets at below-market prices, assets no longer being used productively. However, by 2017, Xi's promise of economic reforms was said to have stalled by external observers. In 2015, the Chinese stock market bubble popped, which led Xi to use state forces to fix it. China's economy has grown under Xi, more than doubling from CN¥54.8 trillion (US$8.7 trillion) in 2012 to CN¥140.2 trillion (US$20.1 trillion) in 2025, while China's nominal GDP per capita increased from CN¥40,431 (US$6,408) in 2012 to CN¥99,665 (US$14,318) in 2025, surpassing the world average in 2021, though growth has slowed from 7.9% in 2012 to 5% in 2025.

Xi has increased state control over the economy, voicing support for SOEs, while also supporting the private sector. CCP control of SOEs has increased, while limited steps towards market liberalization, such as increasing mixed ownership of SOEs were undertaken. Under Xi, an increasing number of private companies have established Party branches. From 2012 to 2022, the share of the market value of private sector firms in China's top listed companies increased from 10% to over 40%. He has overseen the relaxation of restrictions on foreign direct investment (FDI) and increased cross-border holdings of stocks and bonds. His administration made it easier for banks to issue mortgages, increased foreign participation in the bond market, and increased the national currency renminbi's global role, helping it to join IMF's basket of special drawing right. Xi launched the Shanghai Free-Trade Zone in 2013. In 2018, Xi announced the Shanghai Stock Exchange STAR Market, which opened in 2019. He also led the establishment of the Hainan Free Trade Port. In 2020, The Wall Street Journal reported that Xi ordered a halt to Ant Group's initial public offering (IPO), in reaction to its founder Jack Ma criticizing government regulation in finance. Under Xi, government guidance funds, public-private investment funds set up by or for government bodies, have raised more than $900 billion for early funding to companies that work in sectors the government deems as strategic. Xi's administration has overseen a decrease in offshore IPOs by Chinese companies, with most Chinese IPOs taking place either in Shanghai or Shenzhen as of 2022, and has increasingly directed funding to IPOs of companies that works in sectors it deems as strategic, including electric vehicles, biotechnology, renewable energy, artificial intelligence, semiconductors and other high-technology manufacturing.

Xi has formulated the new concept for development, stressing the importance of high-quality development rather than "inflated growth". He has stated China has abandoned a growth-at-all-costs strategy which Xi refers to as "GDP heroism". Instead, Xi said other social issues such as environmental protection are important. Xi has made eradicating extreme poverty through targeted poverty alleviation a key goal. In 2015, he launched the battle against poverty. The campaign concluded by 2021, when Xi declared a "complete victory" over extreme poverty, saying nearly 100 million have been lifted out of poverty under his tenure, though some experts said China's poverty threshold was lower than that of the World Bank. In 2020, premier Li Keqiang, citing the National Bureau of Statistics (NBS) said that China still had 600 million people living with less than 1000 yuan ($140) a month, although The Economist said the methodology NBS used was flawed. When Xi took office in 2012, 58% of people in China were living on less than $8.30 per day, in 2022 this had fallen to 21%. At the 19th Party Congress in 2017, Xi stated the primary contradiction of China's conditions in the new era as "the contradiction between the people's ever-growing need for a better life and unbalanced and inadequate development." In this context, "unbalanced" refers to rural-urban inequalities, regional inequalities, inequalities between the rich and poor, and structural imbalances in the economy. "Inadequate" refers to household income share.

Xi has overseen regional economic development initiatives within China such as the Coordinated Development of the Beijing-Tianjin-Hebei Region, Strategy for Integrated Development of the Yangtze River Delta and the Guangdong–Hong Kong–Macao Greater Bay Area. Xi has been involved in the development of Xiong'an, a new area announced in 2017, planned to become a major metropolis near Beijing; the relocation aspect is estimated to last until 2035 while it is planned to developed into a "modern socialist city" by 2050. Additionally, Xi's administration has accelerated efforts to further integrate border regions such as Tibet and Xinjiang with the rest of China. Xi supports dual circulation, a reorientation of the economy towards domestic consumption while remaining open to foreign trade and investment. Xi has prioritised boosting productivity. Xi has attempted to reform the property sector to combat the steep increase in prices and cut the economy's dependence on it. In the 19th CCP National Congress, Xi declared "houses are for living, not for speculation." In 2020, Xi's government formulated the "three red lines" policy that aimed to deleverage the heavily indebted property sector. Xi has supported a property tax, for which he has faced resistance from members of the CCP. His administration pursued a debt-deleveraging campaign, seeking to slow and cut the unsustainable amount of debt China has accrued during its growth. Since 2021, China has faced a property sector crisis, with decreasing house prices, shrinking of the real estate sector and bankruptcies of many property developers, partially as a result of Xi's efforts to decrease the sector's role in the Chinese economy.

Xi has heavily emphasized the role of advanced manufacturing and technology development to drive China's future economic growth. Since shortly after taking office as General Secretary, Xi emphasised the use of industrial policy to increase domestic innovation and reduce reliance on foreign technology. In 2015, Xi's administration launched the Double First-Class Construction, a higher education development and sponsorship scheme intended to replace the previous programs Project 211 and Project 985. Xi's administration has promoted Made in China 2025 plan that aims to make China self-reliant in key technologies; although publicly China de-emphasised this plan due to the outbreak of a China–United States trade war, majority of its goals were considered achieved by 2024. Since the outbreak of the trade war in 2018, Xi has further pushed calls for "self-reliance", especially on technology. China's domestic spending on R&D has significantly increased, surpassing the European Union (EU) and reaching a record $564 billion in 2020. The Chinese government has supported technology companies like Huawei through grants, tax breaks, credit facilities and other assistance, enabling their rise, leading to US countermeasures. In 2023, Xi put forward new productive forces, this refers to a new form of productive forces derived from continuous sci-tech breakthroughs and innovation that drive strategic emerging and future industries in a more intelligent information era. Under Xi, China made rapid advances in key technological areas, becoming a world leader in tech such as electric vehicles, lithium batteries and solar panels, as well as emerging as a global leader in artificial intelligence.

Common prosperity is an essential requirement of socialism and a key feature of Chinese-style modernization. The common prosperity we are pursuing is for all, affluence both in material and spiritual life, but not for a small portion nor for uniform egalitarianism.

— Xi Jinping during a speech in 2021

Income inequality decreased during Xi's tenure. Since 2021, Xi has promoted the term common prosperity, which he defined as an "essential requirement of socialism", described as affluence for all and said entailed reasonable adjustments to excess incomes. Common prosperity has been used as the justification for large-scale crackdowns and regulations towards the perceived "excesses" of several sectors, most prominently tech and tutoring industries. Actions taken include fining large tech companies and passing laws such as the Data Security Law. China introduced severe restrictions on private tutoring in the name of promoting social equality, effectively eliminating the private education industry. Xi opened a new stock exchange in Beijing targeted for small and medium enterprises (SMEs). There have been other cultural regulations including restrictions on minors playing video games and crackdowns on celebrity culture. The push for common prosperity has also included salary and bonus cuts, especially across the financial sector, as well as crackdowns on wealth flaunting.

=== Foreign policy ===
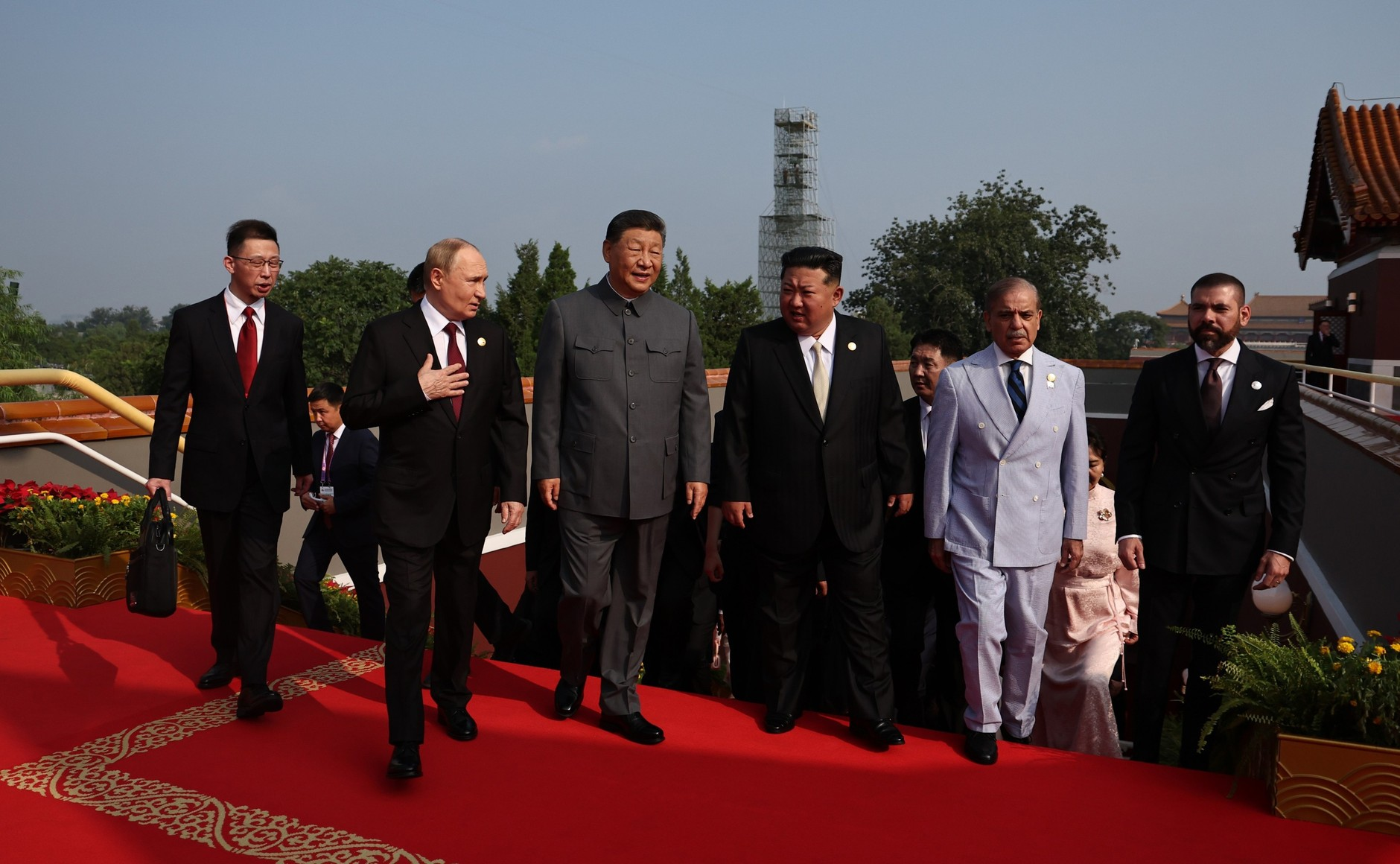
Xi together with North Korean leader Kim Jong Un, Russian President Vladimir Putin and Pakistani Prime Minister Shehbaz Sharif during the 2025 China Victory Day Parade

Xi has taken a harder line on security issues as well as foreign affairs, projecting a more nationalist and assertive China on the world stage. His political program calls for a China more united and confident of its own value system and political structure. Foreign analysts and observers have frequently said that Xi's main foreign policy objective is to restore China's position on the global stage as a great power. Xi advocates "baseline thinking" in China's foreign policy: setting explicit red lines that other countries must not cross. In the Chinese perspective, these tough stances on baseline issues reduce strategic uncertainty, preventing other nations from misjudging China's positions or underestimating China's resolve in asserting what it perceives to be in its national interest. Xi stated during the 20th CCP National Congress that he wanted to ensure China "leads the world in terms of composite national strength and international influence" by 2049.

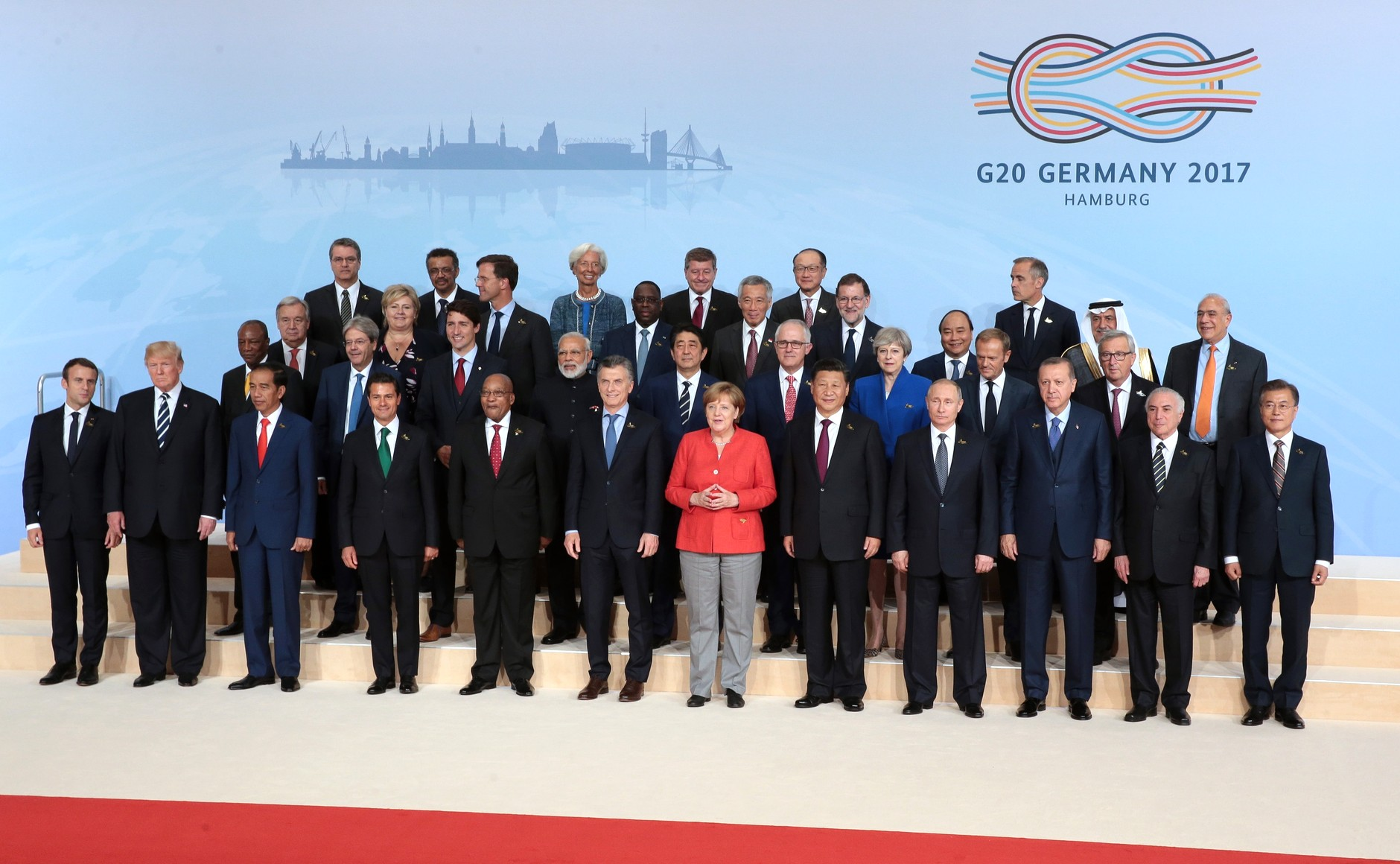
World leaders assemble for "family photo" at G20 summit in Hamburg.

Xi's foreign policy thoughts are collectively known as Xi Jinping Thought on Diplomacy. Xi has promoted major-country diplomacy, stating that China is already a "big power" and breaking away from previous Chinese leaders who had a more precautious diplomacy. Diplomats under Xi have adopted a hawkish foreign policy posture called "wolf warrior diplomacy" starting from the late 2010s; this form of diplomacy peaked in the early 2020s and declined afterwards. Xi frequently says that the world is seeing "great changes unseen in a century", referring to geopolitical shifts in which the United States is seen as a declining power and in which the rise of populism, economic securitization, and advancing technology create an environment of uncertainty that results in both opportunities and threats for China. In October 2020, he said that "the East is rising and the West is declining", saying that the power of the Western world was in decline as exemplified by their COVID-19 response, and that China was entering a period of opportunity because of this.

Xi has frequently alluded to community with a shared future for mankind, which Chinese diplomats have said does not imply an intention to change the international order, but which foreign observers say China wants a new order that puts it more at the centre. During the Xi administration, China seeks to shape international norms and rules in emerging policy areas where China has an advantage as an early participant. Xi describes such areas as "new frontiers", and they include policy areas such as space, deep sea, polar regions, the Internet, nuclear safety, anticorruption, and climate change. Xi has put an emphasis on increasing China's "international discourse power" (国际话语权) to create a more favorable global opinion of China in the world. In this pursuit, Xi has emphasised the need to "tell China's story well", meaning expanding China's external propaganda (外宣) and communications. Xi has expanded the focus and scope of the united front, which aims to consolidate support for CCP in non-CCP elements both inside and outside China, and has accordingly expanded the United Front Work Department.

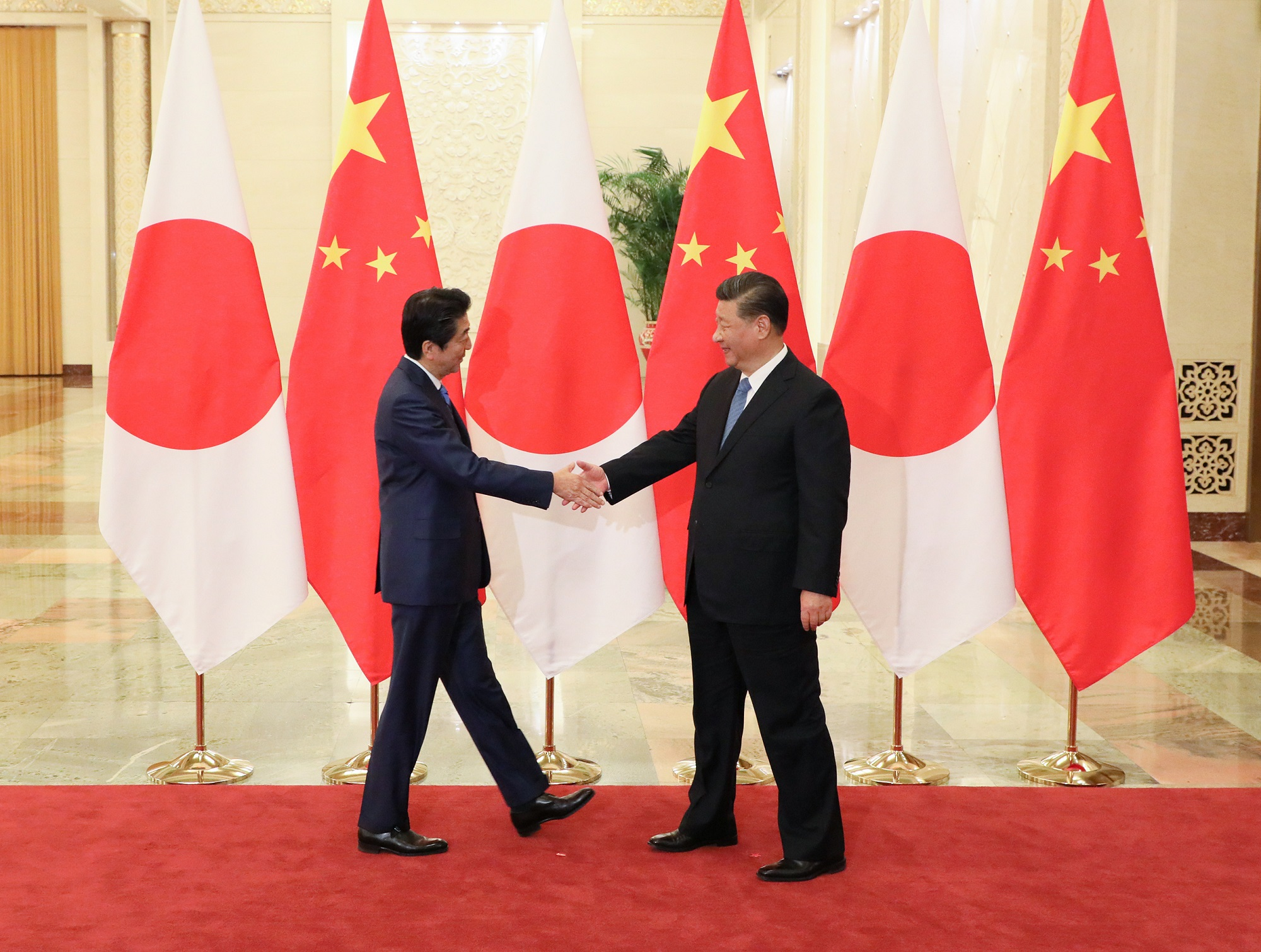
Xi and Japanese Prime Minister Shinzo Abe in Beijing, December 2019

In 2013, Xi announced the Belt and Road Initiative (BRI), a global infrastructure and economic development project. Encompassing much of Africa and Eurasia, the BRI became central to Chinese foreign policy and is the largest infrastructure investment by a great power since the Marshall Plan. In 2015, Xi announced the founding of the Asia Infrastructure Investment Bank, seen as a competitor to other multilateral banks such as the World Bank and the Asia Development Bank. Xi has unveiled the Global Development Initiative (GDI), the Global Security Initiative (GSI), the Global Civilisation Initiative (GCI), and the Global Governance Initiative (GGI) in 2021, 2022, 2023 and 2025 respectively, aiming to increase China's influence in the international order. Under Xi, China has, along with Russia, also focused on increasing relations with the Global South in order to blunt the effect of international sanctions.

==== Africa ====
During Xi's administration, China has maintained cordial relationships with each Africa government except Eswatini, which recognizes Taiwan but not the PRC. Under Xi, China has cut back lending to Africa after fears that African countries could not repay their debts to China. Xi has also promised that China would write off debts of some African countries. In 2025, China announced that it would remove nearly all import tariffs on African countries.

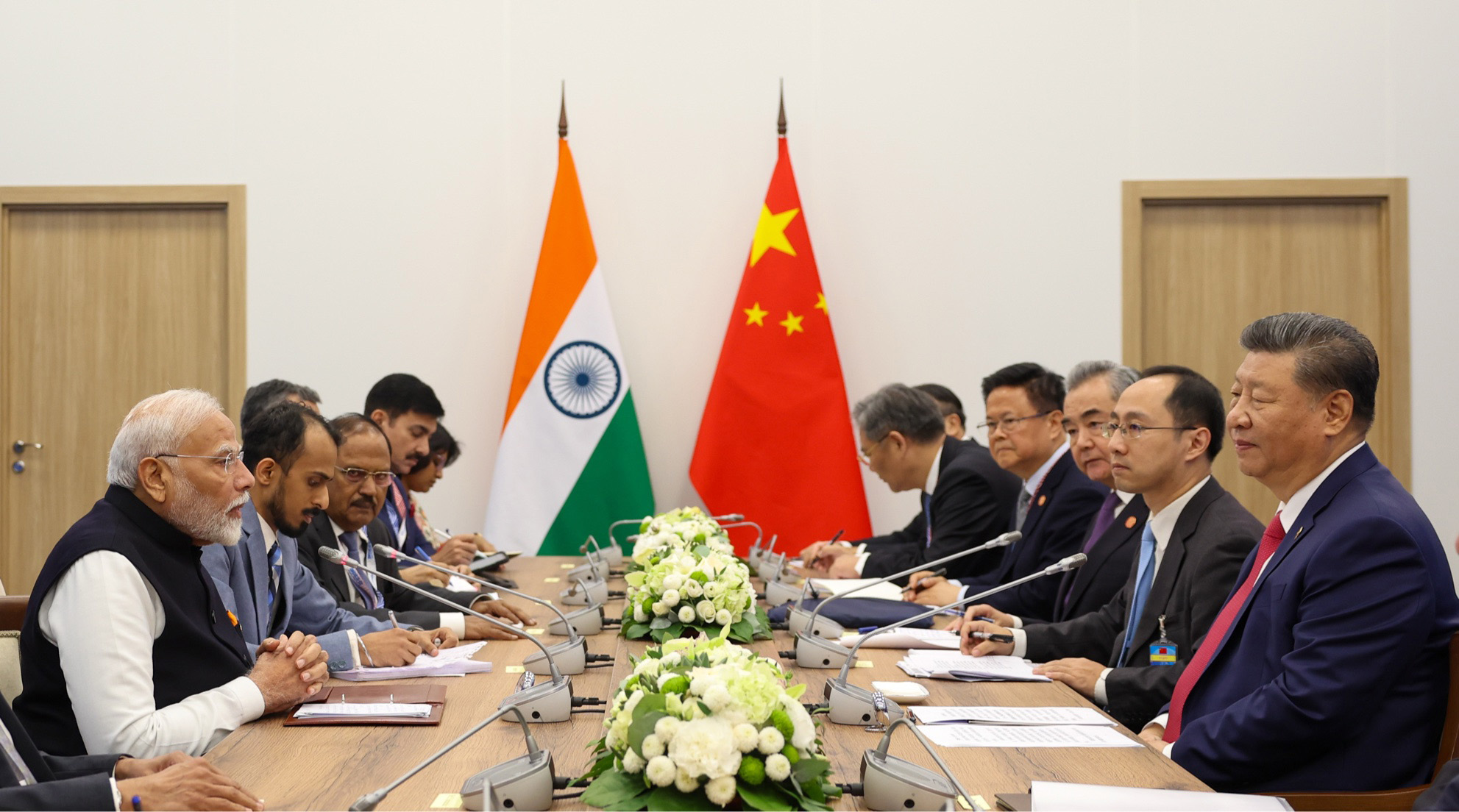
Xi meeting Indian Prime Minister Narendra Modi at the 16th BRICS Summit in Kazan, Russia, October 2024

==== Asia ====
Under Xi, China initially took a more critical stance on North Korea due to its nuclear tests. However, starting in 2018, the relations started to improve due to meetings between Xi and North Korean leader Kim Jong Un. Xi has initially improved relationships with South Korea, and the two countries signed a free-trade agreement in December 2015. Starting in 2017, China's relationship with South Korea soured over the Terminal High Altitude Area Defence (THAAD), a missile defense system, deployment of the latter, but improved after South Korea halted further deployments on the THAAD. China–Japan relations have initially soured under Xi's administration; the most thorny issue between the two countries remains the dispute over the Senkaku Islands, which China calls Diaoyu. However, the relations later started to improve, though deteriorated in 2025 after comments made by Prime Minister Sanae Takaichi regarding a potential defense of Taiwan.

Since Xi came to power, China has been rapidly building and militarizing islands in the South China Sea, a decision Study Times of the Central Party School said was personally taken by Xi. Relations between China and India had ups and downs under Xi. The two countries had a standoff in Depsang in 2013, and again had a standoff over a Chinese construction of a road in Doklam, a territory both claimed by Bhutan, India's ally, and China, in 2017. The most serious crisis in the relationship came when the two countries had a deadly clash in 2020 at the Line of Actual Control, leaving some soldiers dead. The relationship later improved starting from 2024. While China has historically been wary of getting closer to the Middle East countries, Xi has changed this approach, getting closer to both Iran and Saudi Arabia.

==== Europe ====
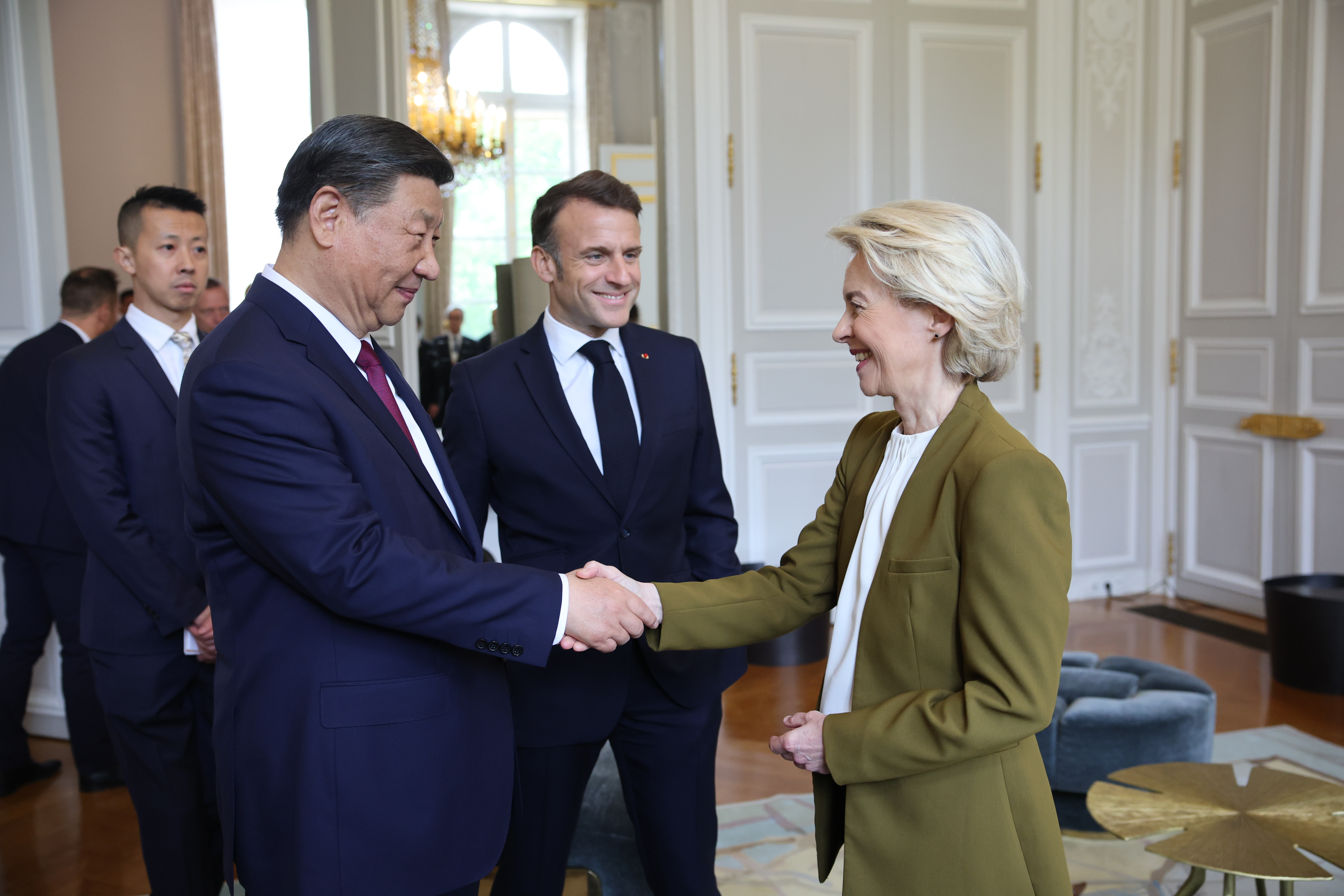
Xi with French President Emmanuel Macron and European Commission President Ursula von der Leyen during his state visit to France, 6 May 2024

China's efforts under Xi has been for the European Union (EU) to stay in a neutral position in their contest with the U.S. China and the EU announced the Comprehensive Agreement on Investment (CAI) in 2020, although the deal was later frozen due to mutual sanctions over Xinjiang.

Xi has cultivated stronger relations with Russia, particularly in the wake of the Ukraine crisis of 2014. Following the 2022 Russian invasion of Ukraine and during the Russo-Ukrainian war, Xi expressed opposition to sanctions against Russia and asserted China's support for Russia on issues of sovereignty and security, but also said China is committed to respecting "the territorial integrity of all countries", while China has cast itself as a neutral party. Xi's stance during the war has been criticized by Ukraine and several Western governments, which argued that China's support for Russia and its defense industrial base was inconsistent with its stated neutrality.

==== United States ====
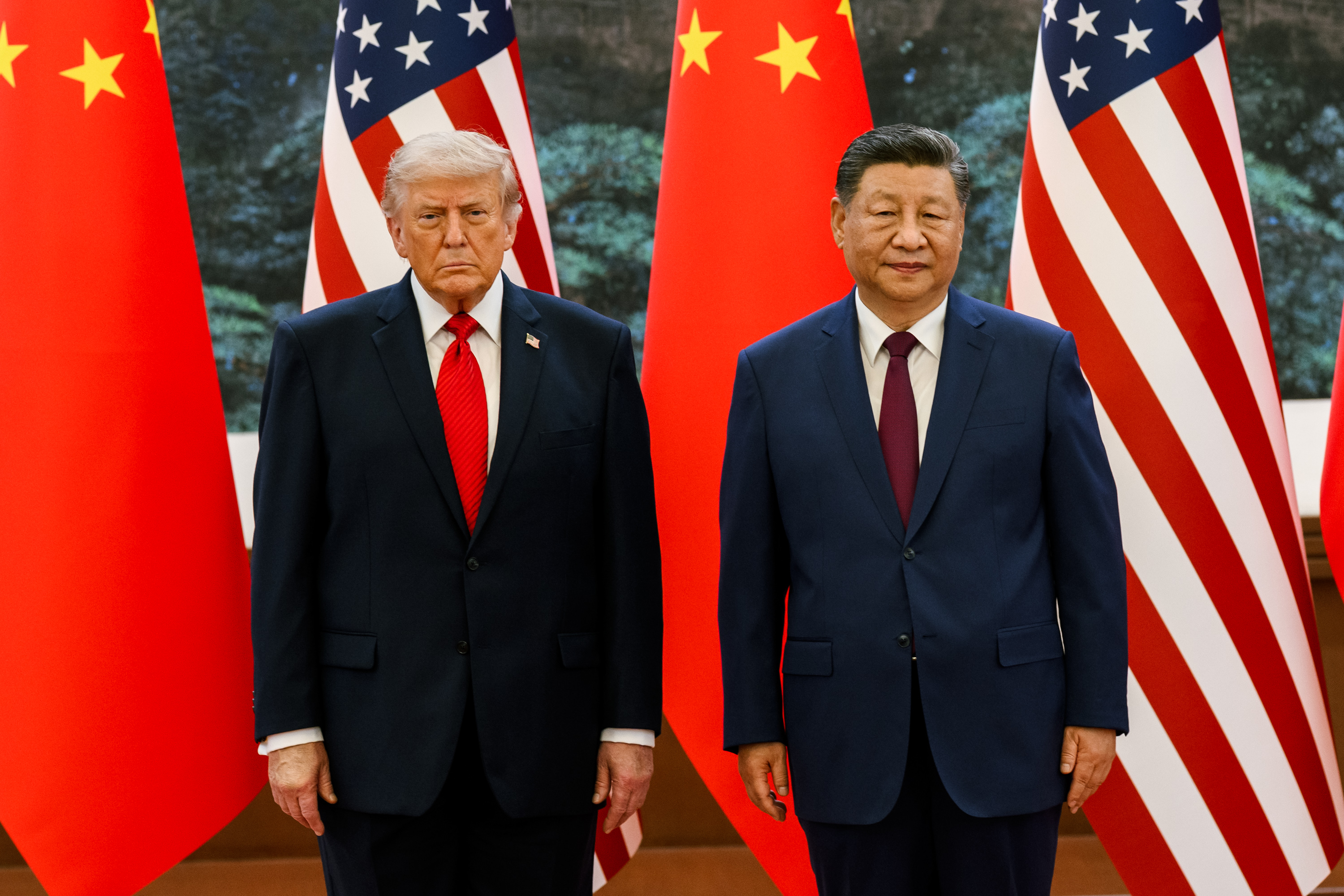
With U.S. president Donald Trump in Beijing during his visit to China, May 2026

Xi has called China–United States relations in the contemporary world a "new type of great-power relations", a phrase the Obama administration had been reluctant to embrace. Xi has indirectly spoken out critically on the U.S. "strategic pivot" to Asia. Relations with the U.S. soured after Donald Trump became president in 2017. Since 2018, U.S. and China have been engaged in an escalating trade war. In 2020, the relations further deteriorated due to the COVID-19 pandemic.

=== National security ===
Xi has devoted a large amount of work towards national security, calling for the establishment of a holistic national security concept that encompasses "all aspects of the work of the party and the country." He introduced the concept in 2014, which he defined as taking "the security of the people as compass, political security as its roots, economic security as its pillar, military security and cultural security as its protections, and that relies on the promotion of international security." A new National Security Commission was formed in 2014 with Xi at its helm, centralizing national security decision-making. Since its creation by Xi, the National Security Commission has established local security committees, focusing on dissent.

Believing it to be an important foundation of national security, Xi's administration has prioritized efforts to establish food security by pushing for as much as self-sufficiency in food as possible, while launching the Clean Plate campaign in 2013 and 2020 to combat food waste. He has additionally given priority to energy security; China is the world's largest energy consumer, having consumed more energy than the United States, the European Union and Japan combined in 2024. China has made heavy investments in its energy grid and designed policies to lessen dependence on foreign energy imports by investing in renewable energy as well as coal.

Xi has championed the Fengqiao experience, calling on officials to contain and resolve conflicts at the grassroots level without needing to involve higher legal bodies. In the name of national security, Xi's government has passed numerous laws including the Counterespionage Law in 2014, the National Security Law and the Counterterrorism Law in 2015, the Cybersecurity Law and the Law on Administration of Foreign NGOs' Activities within China in 2016, the National Intelligence Law in 2017, and the Data Security Law in 2021. Under Xi, China's mass surveillance network has dramatically grown, with comprehensive profiles being built for each citizen. Grid-style social management, which involves subdividing China's counties into smaller zones, and assigning each zone to a person that reports all activity to the local government on a regular basis, has risen in prominence under Xi. Public security spending has increased significantly under Xi, reaching $210 billion in 2020, more than double from the decade prior; this was accompanied by a significant decrease in crime. Xi's leadership has also seen a more prominent role taken by the Ministry of State Security, which expanded its public profile.

=== Hong Kong ===
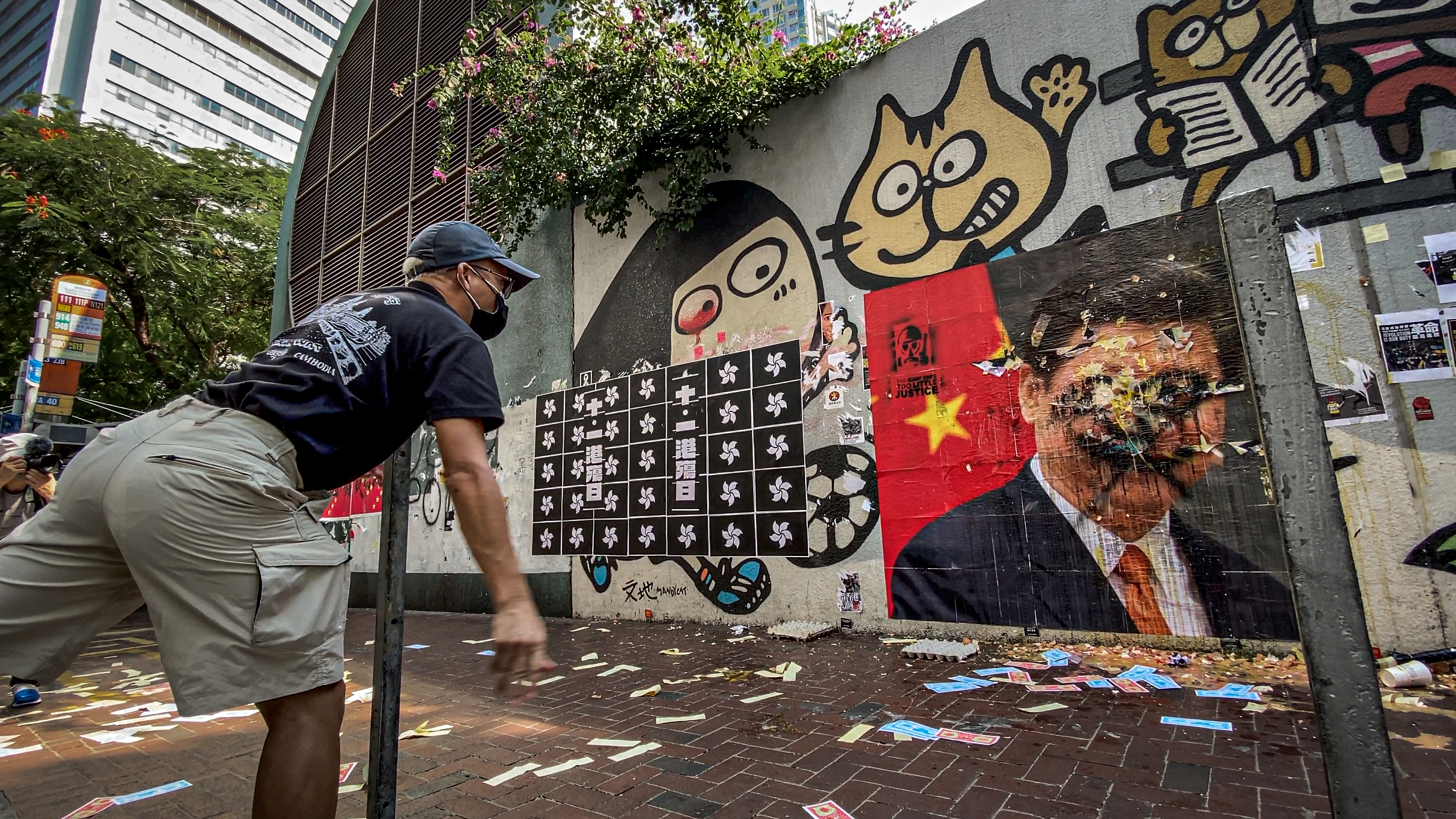
Some Hong Kong protesters throw eggs at Xi's portrait on National Day.

During his leadership, Xi has supported and pursued a greater political and economic integration of Hong Kong to mainland China, including through projects such as the Hong Kong–Zhuhai–Macau Bridge. Xi visited Hong Kong as Chinese leader in 2017 and 2022, for the 20th and 25th anniversaries of the handover of Hong Kong respectively. During his 2017 visit, Xi swore in Carrie Lam as chief executive. In his 2022 visit, he swore in John Lee Ka-chiu as chief executive, a former police officer that was backed by the Chinese government to expand control over the city. He has pushed for the Greater Bay Area project, which aims to integrate Hong Kong, Macau, and nine other cities in Guangdong. Xi's integration efforts have led to deeper economic links between mainland China and Hong Kong, as well as decreased freedoms and the weakening of Hong Kong's distinct identity from mainland China. Many of the views held by the central government and eventually implemented in Hong Kong were outlined in a white paper published by the State Council Information Office in 2014 named The Practice of the 'One Country, Two Systems' Policy in the Hong Kong Special Administrative Region, which outlined that the scope of Hong Kong's autonomy is not inherent, but solely determined by the Central Authorities' delegation of power. Under Xi, the Chinese government also declared the Sino-British Joint Declaration to be legally void. In August 2014, the Standing Committee of the National People's Congress (NPCSC) made a decision allowing universal suffrage for the 2017 election of the chief executive of Hong Kong, also requiring the candidates to "love the country, and love Hong Kong," as well as other measures that ensured the Chinese leadership would be the ultimate decision-maker on the selection, leading to protests, and the eventual rejection of the reform bill in the Legislative Council due to a walk-out by the pro-Beijing camp to delay to vote.

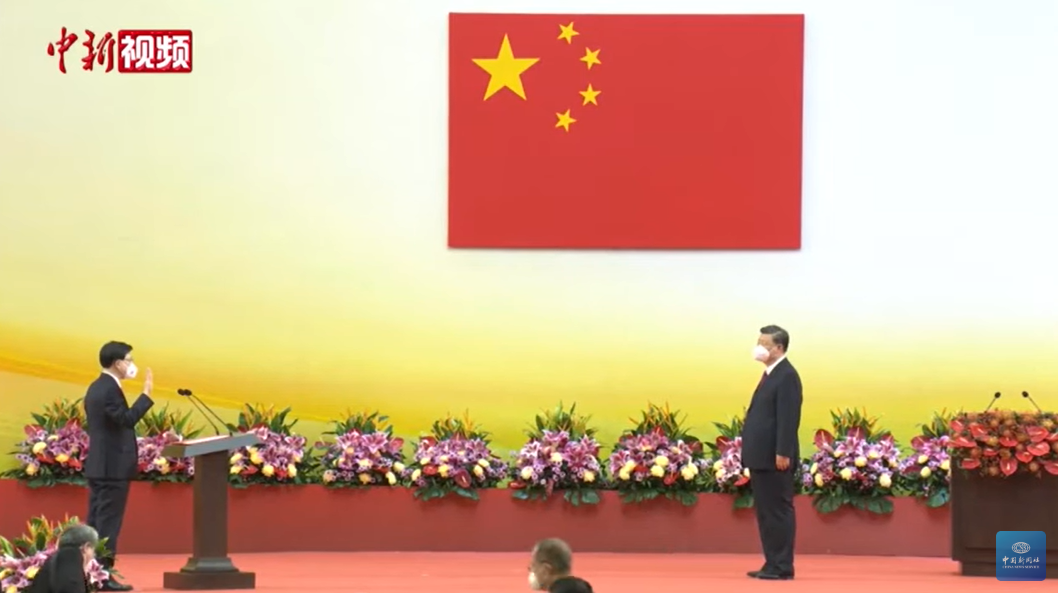
Xi swearing in John Lee Ka-chiu as chief executive during the 25th anniversary of Hong Kong's return to China

In the 2017 chief executive election, Carrie Lam was victorious, reportedly with the endorsement of the CCP Politburo. Xi supported the Hong Kong Government and Carrie Lam against the protesters in the 2019–2020 Hong Kong protests, which broke out after a proposed bill that would allow extraditions to mainland China. He defended the Hong Kong Police Force's use of force, saying that "We sternly support the Hong Kong police to take forceful actions in enforcing the law, and the Hong Kong judiciary to punish in accordance with the law those who have committed violent crimes." While visiting Macau on 20 December 2019 as part of the 20th anniversary of its return to China, Xi warned of foreign forces interfering in Hong Kong and Macau, while also hinting that Macau could be a model for Hong Kong to follow. In 2020, the NPCSC passed a national security law in Hong Kong that dramatically expanded government clampdown over the opposition in the city; amongst the measures were the dramatic restriction on political opposition and the creation of the Office for Safeguarding National Security outside Hong Kong jurisdiction to oversee the enforcement of the law. Since the passage of the national security law, China has emphasized the "patriots administering Hong Kong" principle, leading Hong Kong to pass electoral reforms in 2021 (for the chief executive, the Legislative Council and the Election Committee) and 2023 (for the district councils) to ensure dominance of pro-Beijing candidates. Under John Lee Ka-chiu, Hong Kong adopted the Safeguarding National Security Ordinance in 2024 to implement Article 23 of the Hong Kong Basic Law, further criminalizing acts endangering national security.

=== Taiwan ===
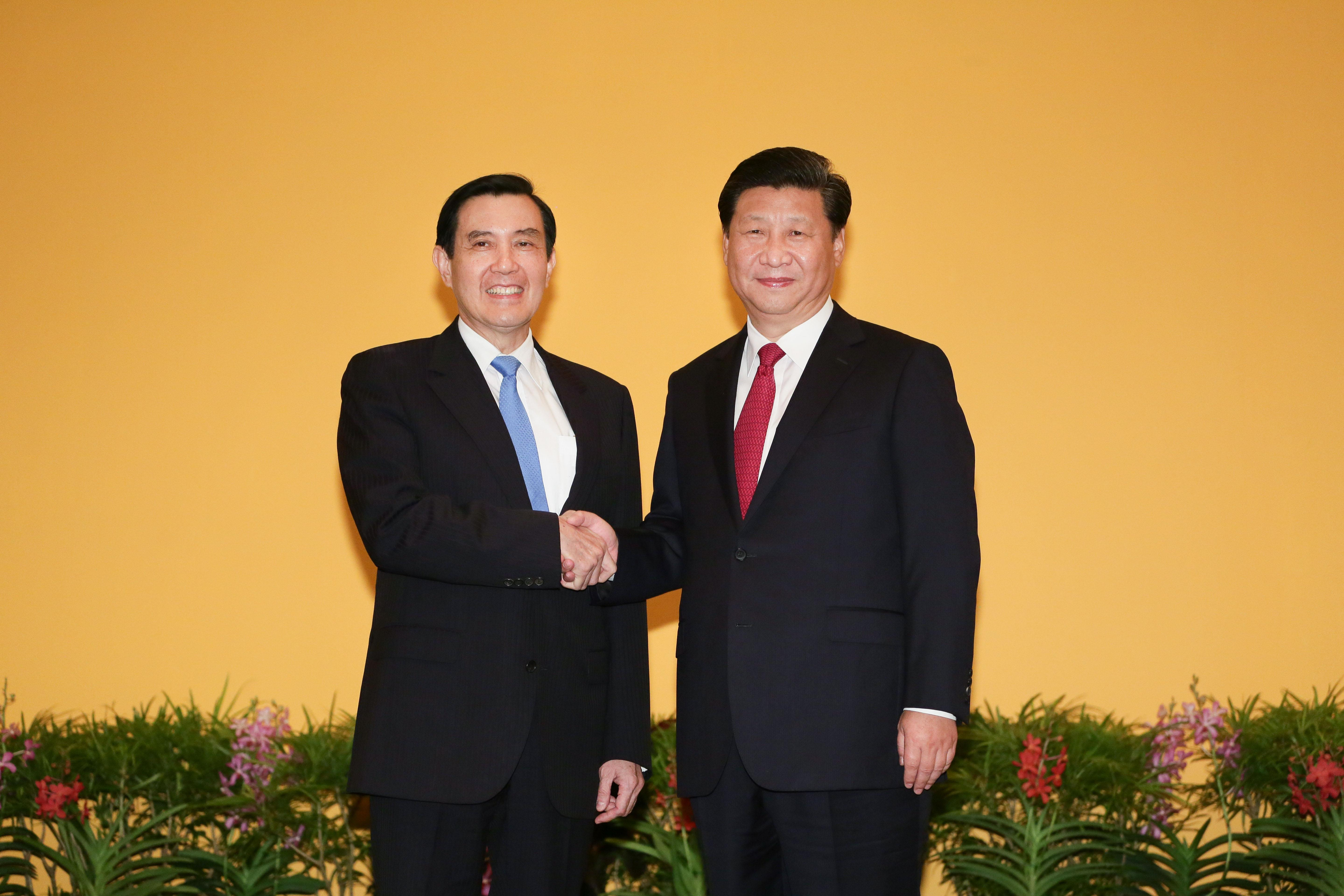
Xi meeting with then-Taiwanese president Ma Ying-jeou in November 2015

In 2013, Xi coined the slogan "people on both sides of the Taiwan Strait are all of the same family" regarding mainland China and Taiwan. Wang Yu-chi, Minister of Taiwan's Mainland Affairs Council, visited Nanjing in 2014, where he met with Zhang Zhijun, Director of the Taiwan Affairs Office, making the first official, high-level, government-to-government contact between the two sides since 1949. In November 2015, Xi met with Taiwanese president Ma Ying-jeou in Singapore, which marked the first time the political leaders of both sides of the Taiwan Strait have met since the end of the Chinese Civil War in mainland China in 1950. However, the relations started deteriorating after Tsai Ing-wen of the Democratic Progressive Party (DPP) won the 2016 presidential elections.

In the 19th Party Congress held in 2017, Xi reaffirmed six of the nine principles that had been affirmed continuously since the 16th Party Congress in 2002, with the notable exception of "Placing hopes on the Taiwan people as a force to help bring about unification". According to the Brookings Institution, Xi used stronger language on potential Taiwan independence than his predecessors towards previous DPP governments in Taiwan. Xi said that "we will never allow any person, any organisation, or any political party to split any part of the Chinese territory from China at any time at any form." At the same time, he offered the chance for open talks and "unobstructed exchanges" with Taiwan as long as the government moved to accept the 1992 Consensus. Xi stated that people from Taiwan could receive national treatment in pursuing careers on the mainland and in February 2018 the PRC government announced 31 preferential policies for Taiwan people on matters of industry, finance, taxation, land use, employment, education, and health care.

In January 2019, Xi gave a speech commemorating the 40th anniversary of the Message to Compatriots in Taiwan, outlining five points proposing unification under the "one country, two systems" formula. He called on Taiwan to reject formal independence from China, saying: "We make no promise to renounce the use of force and reserve the option of taking all necessary means." Those options, he said, could be used against "external interference". Xi also said that they "are willing to create broad space for peaceful reunification, but will leave no room for any form of separatist activities." President Tsai responded to the speech by saying Taiwan would not accept a one country, two systems arrangement with the mainland, while stressing the need for all cross-strait negotiations to be on a government-to-government basis. Since 2018, the People's Liberation Army has conducted military drills around Taiwan with increasing frequency to pressure the DPP-led government. In 2022, the Chinese government released The Taiwan Question and China's Reunification in the New Era, outlining the PRC's official line on Taiwan under Xi. In 2025, China established the "Commemoration Day of Taiwan's Restoration", a decision which Taiwan Affairs Office director Song Tao said was done "personally" by Xi.

=== Human rights ===
According to the Human Rights Watch, Xi has "started a broad and sustained offensive on human rights" since he became leader in 2012. The HRW also said that repression in China is "at its worst level since the Tiananmen Square massacre." Since taking power, Xi has cracked down on grassroots activism, with hundreds being detained. He presided over the 709 crackdown on 9 July 2015, which saw more than 200 lawyers, legal assistants and human rights activists being detained. His term has seen the arrest and imprisonment of activists such as Xu Zhiyong, as well as numerous others who identified with the New Citizens' Movement. Prominent legal activist Pu Zhiqiang of the Weiquan movement was also arrested and detained. According to activists, "Xi is waging the most severe systematic suppression of Christianity in the country since religious freedom was written into the Chinese constitution in 1982," and according to pastors and a group that monitors religion in China, has involved "destroying crosses, burning bibles, shutting churches and ordering followers to sign papers renouncing their faith."

Under Xi, the CCP has embraced assimilationist policies towards ethnic minorities, scaling back affirmative action in the country by 2019, and scrapping a wording in October 2021 that guaranteed the rights of minority children to be educated in their native language, replacing it with one that emphasized teaching the national language. In 2014, Xi called to foster a sense of community for the Chinese nation among ethnic minorities. In 2020, Chen Xiaojiang was appointed as head of the National Ethnic Affairs Commission, the first Han Chinese head of the body since 1954. On 24 June 2022, Pan Yue, another Han Chinese, became the head of the commission, with him reportedly holding assimilationist policies toward ethnic minorities. Xi outlined his official views relations between the majority Han Chinese and ethnic minorities by saying "[n]either Han chauvinism nor local ethnic chauvinism is conducive to the development of a community for the Chinese nation." Xi's policies toward ethnic minorities were codified in the Law on Promoting Ethnic Unity and Progress in 2026.

==== Xinjiang ====
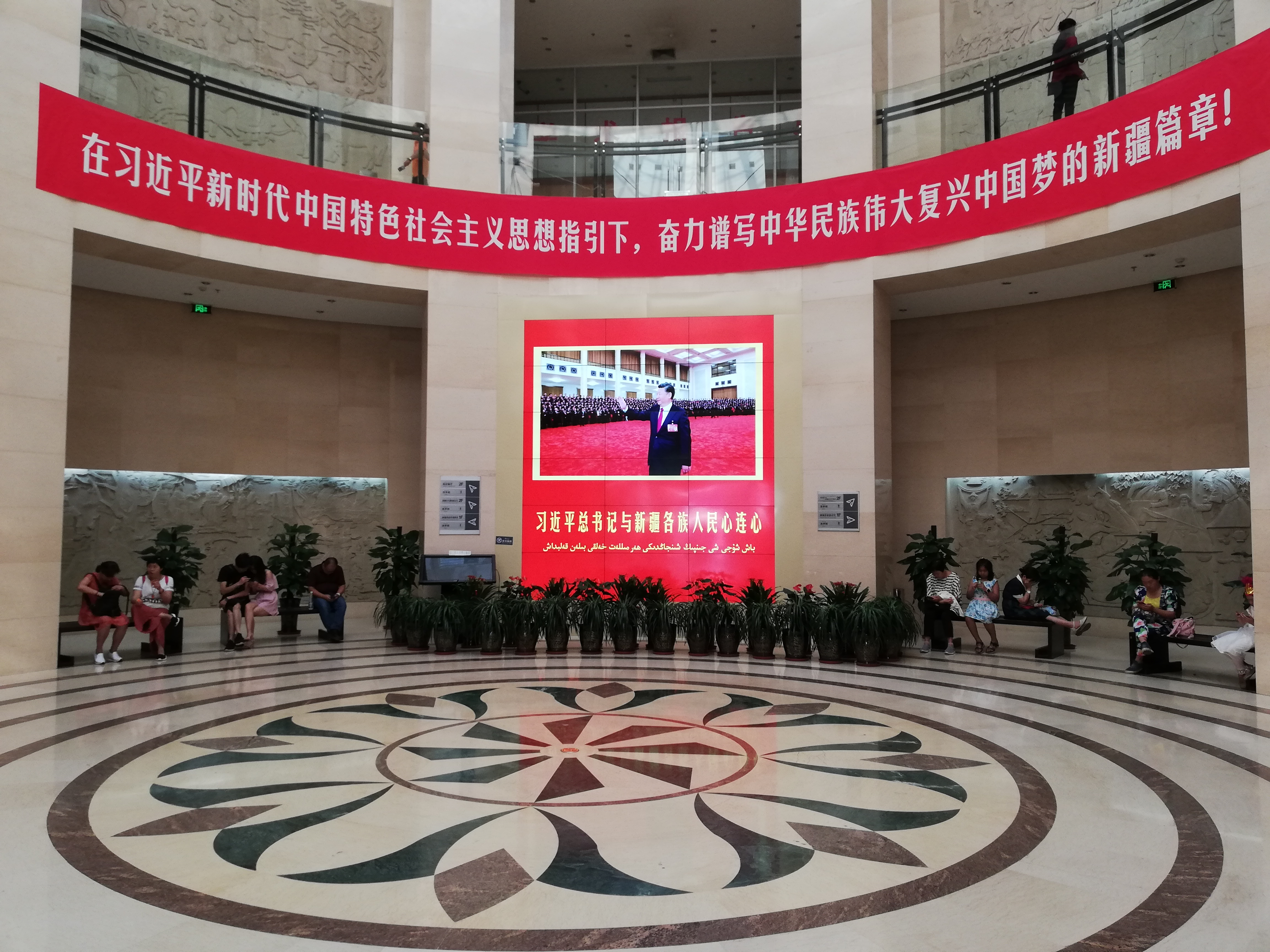
Xi's picture at the entrance hall of the Xinjiang Museum in Ürümqi in August 2018

There were several terrorist attacks in Xinjiang in 2013 and 2014; an attack in Ürümqi in April 2014 occurred just after the conclusion of a visit by Xi to Xinjiang. Following these attacks, CCP leaders held a secret meeting to find a solution, leading to Xi to launch the Strike Hard Campaign Against Violent Terrorism in 2014, which involved mass detention, and surveillance of ethnic Uyghurs there. The campaign included the detainment of 1.8 million people in re-education camps, mostly Uyghurs but also including other ethnic and religious minorities, by 2020, and a birth suppression campaign that led to a large drop in the Uyghur birth rate by 2019. Human rights groups and former inmates have said Uyghurs and other minorities have been forcibly assimilated into China's majority ethnic Han society in the camps. This program has been called a genocide by some observers, while a report by the UN Human Rights Office said they may amount to crimes against humanity.

Internal Chinese government documents leaked to the press in November 2019 showed that Xi personally ordered a security crackdown in Xinjiang, saying that the party must show "absolutely no mercy" and that officials use all the "weapons of the people's democratic dictatorship" to suppress those "infected with the virus of extremism." The papers also showed that Xi repeatedly discussed Islamic extremism in his speeches, likening it to a "virus" or a "drug" that could be only addressed by "a period of painful, interventionary treatment." However, he also warned against the discrimination against Uyghurs and rejected proposals to eradicate Islam in China, calling that kind of viewpoint "biased, even wrong." Xi's exact role in the building of re-education camps has not been publicly reported, though he's widely believed to be behind them and his words have been the source for major justifications in the crackdown in Xinjiang. China began to wind down the camps in 2019, and some detainees were transferred to the penal system, while others were transferred to forced labor and factory work programs. In a July 2022 visit to Xinjiang, Xi urged local officials to always listen to the citizens' voices and to improve efforts in preserving ethnic minority culture. In a visit to Xinjiang the following year, Xi stated that the region was "no longer a remote area" and should open up more for tourism to attract domestic and foreign visitors.

=== Education ===
In 2014, the Party General Office and State Council issued guidance on strengthening ideological education in colleges and universities. During Xi Jinping's tenure, numerous colleges and universities have established schools of Marxism. Xi has implemented a number of education reforms. Schools are required to adjust their opening hours to be consistent with work hours in their area so that parents can pick-up their children directly after work (in order to reduce reliance on private classes for adult supervision after school hours). Schools must also promote health by requiring outdoor physical education classes daily and providing eye examinations twice per term. Educational reforms have also limited the amount of homework students can be assigned.

In 2021, Xi enacted the Double Reduction Policy (reducing excessive off-campus tutoring and reducing homework burdens), mandating schools may not assign homework to children to grades one and two, homework is limited to no more than 60 minutes for children in grades three to six, and no more than 90 minutes for middle school children. In July 2021, China enacted a series of rules designed to shutdown the private tutoring sector as part of its common prosperity program. Rules issued in July 2021 prohibits new registration of private tuition tutoring centers and required existing centers to re-organize as non-profits. Tuition centers are prohibited from being listed on the stock market or receiving "excessive capital." They are no longer permitted to offer tutoring on the weekends or during public holidays. Since September 2021, private schools providing compulsory education can no longer be controlled by foreign entities or individuals. Only Chinese nationals may serve on their boards of directors. In 2023, the Patriotic Education Law was adopted, codifying the mandatory patriotic education program in the country.

=== COVID-19 pandemic ===
On 20 January 2020, Xi commented for the first time on the emerging COVID-19 pandemic in Wuhan, and ordered "efforts to curb the spread" of the virus. He gave premier Li Keqiang some responsibility over the COVID-19 response, in what has been suggested by The Wall Street Journal was an attempt to potentially insulate himself from criticism if the response failed. The government initially responded to the pandemic with a lockdown and censorship, with the initial response causing widespread backlash within China. Xi met with Tedros Adhanom Ghebreyesus, the director-general of the World Health Organization (WHO), on 28 January. Der Spiegel reported that in January 2020 Xi pressured Tedros Adhanom to hold off on issuing a global warning about the outbreak of COVID-19 and hold back information on human-to-human transmission of the virus, allegations denied by the WHO. On 5 February, Xi met with Cambodian prime minister Hun Sen in Beijing, the first foreign leader allowed into China since the outbreak. After the COVID-19 outbreak got under control in Wuhan, Xi visited the city on 10 March.

After getting the outbreak in Wuhan under control, Xi has favoured what has officially been termed "dynamic zero-COVID policy" that aims to control and suppress the virus as much as possible within the country's borders. This has involved local lockdowns and mass-testing. While initially credited for China's suppression of the COVID-19 outbreak, the policy was later criticized by foreign and some domestic observers for being out of touch with the rest of the world and taking a heavy toll on the economy. This approach has especially come under criticism during a 2022 lockdown on Shanghai, which forced millions to their homes and damaged the city's economy. Conversely, Xi has said that the policy was designed to protect people's life safety. On 23 July 2022, the National Health Commission reported that Xi and other top leaders have taken the local COVID-19 vaccines.

At the 20th CCP Congress, Xi confirmed the continuation of the zero-COVID policy, stating he would "unswervingly" carry out "dynamic zero-COVID" and promising to "resolutely win the battle", though China started a limited easing of the policies in the following weeks. In November 2022, protests broke out against China's COVID-19 policies, with a fire in a high-rise apartment building in Ürümqi being the trigger. The protests were held in multiple major cities, with some of the protesters demanding the end of Xi's and the CCP's rule. The protests were mostly suppressed by December. Following the protests, the government further eased COVID-19 restrictions. On 7 December 2022, China announced large-scale changes to its COVID-19 policy, including allowing quarantine at home for mild infections, reducing of PCR testing, and decreasing the power of local officials to implement lockdowns, effectively ending the zero-COVID policy.

=== Environmental policy ===
Xi identifies environmental protection as one of China's five major priorities for national progress. Xi has popularized a metaphor of "two mountains" to emphasize the importance of environmental protection. The concept is that a mountain made of gold or silver is valuable, but green mountains with clear waters are more valuable. The slogan's meaning is that economic development priorities must also provide for economic protection.

In September 2020, Xi announced that China would "strengthen its 2030 climate target (NDC), peak emissions before 2030 and aim to achieve carbon neutrality before 2060." If accomplished, this would lower the expected rise in global temperature by 0.2–0.3 °C – "the biggest single reduction ever estimated by the Climate Action Tracker." Xi mentioned the link between the COVID-19 pandemic and nature destruction as one of the reasons for the decision, saying that "Humankind can no longer afford to ignore the repeated warnings of nature." On 27 September 2020, Chinese scientists presented a detailed plan how to achieve the target. In September 2021, Xi announced that China will not build "coal-fired power projects abroad", which was said to be potentially "pivotal" in reducing emissions. The Belt and Road Initiative did not include financing such projects in the first half of 2021. Xi did not attend COP26 personally. However, a Chinese delegation led by climate change envoy Xie Zhenhua did attend. During the conference, the United States and China agreed on a framework to reduce GHG emission by co-operating on different measures.

=== Governance style ===
Known as a very secretive leader, little is known publicly about how Xi makes political decisions, or how he came to power. Xi's speeches generally get released months or years after they are made. Xi has also never given a press conference since becoming paramount leader, except in rare joint press conferences with foreign leaders. The Wall Street Journal reported that Xi prefers micromanaging in governance, in contrast to previous leaders such as Hu Jintao who left details of major policies to lower-ranking officials. Reportedly, ministerial officials try to get Xi's attention in various ways, with some creating slide shows and audio reports. The Wall Street Journal also reported that Xi created a performance-review system in 2018 to give evaluations on officials on various measures, including loyalty. According to The Economist, Xi's orders have generally been vague, leaving lower level officials to interpret his words.

Chinese state media Xinhua News Agency said that Xi "personally reviews every draft of major policy documents" and "all reports submitted to him, no matter how late in the evening, were returned with instructions the following morning." With regard to behavior of Communist Party members, Xi emphasizes the "Two Musts" (members must not be arrogant or rash and must keep their hard-working spirit) and the "Six Nos" (members must say no to formalism, bureaucracy, gift-giving, luxurious birthday celebrations, hedonism, and extravagance). Xi called for officials to practice self-criticism which, according to observers, is in order to appear less corrupt and more popular among the people.

== Political positions ==
=== Chinese Dream ===
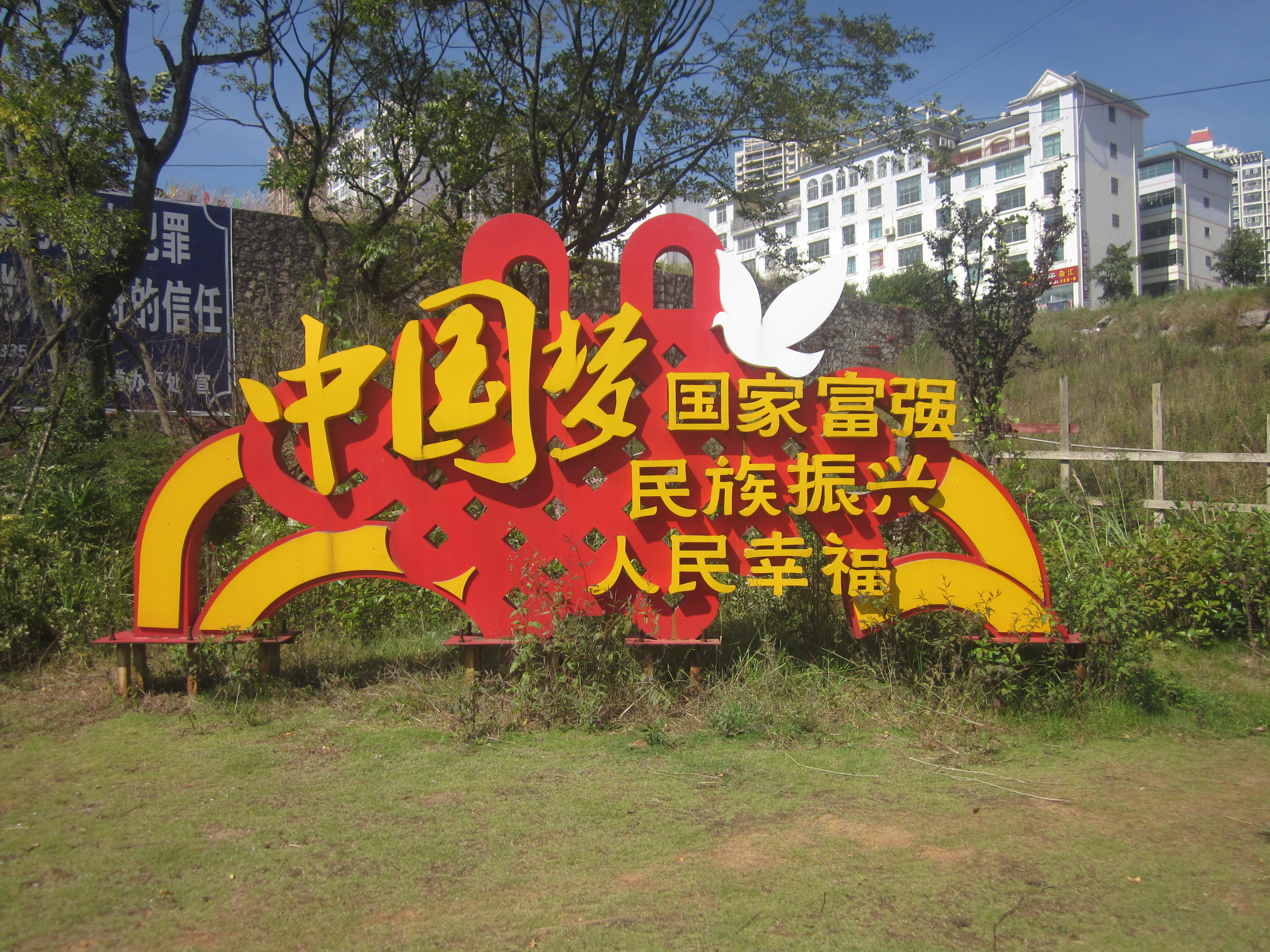
According to Qiushi, the Chinese Dream is about Chinese prosperity, collective effort, socialism, and national glory.

Xi and CCP ideologues coined the phrase "Chinese Dream" to describe his overarching plans for China as its leader. Xi first used the phrase during a high-profile visit to the National Museum of China on 29 November 2012, where he and his Politburo Standing Committee colleagues were attending a "national revival" exhibition. Since then, the phrase has become the signature political slogan of the Xi era. The origin of the term "Chinese Dream" is unclear. While the phrase has been used before by journalists and scholars, some publications have posited the term likely drew its inspiration from the concept of the American Dream. The Economist noted the abstract and seemingly accessible nature of the concept with no specific overarching policy stipulations may be a deliberate departure from the jargon-heavy ideologies of his predecessors. Xi has linked the "Chinese Dream" with the phrase "great rejuvenation of the Chinese nation".

=== Culture ===
Xi has called traditional Chinese culture the "soul" of the nation and the "foundation" of the CCP's culture. He has praised the "splendid Chinese civilization", calling the CCP's governance part of "the uninterrupted development of a civilization for several thousand years" which is "rarely seen among nations in the world". Xi has also called for integrating the basic tenets of Marxism with China's traditional culture. He has established the "Four Confidences", which has later been added to the CCP constitution, calling for CCP members, government officials and the Chinese people to be "confident in our chosen path, confident in our guiding theories, confident in our political system, and confident in our culture." He unveiled Global Civilization Initiative in 2023, calling for "respecting the diversity of civilizations, advocating the common values of humanity, valuing the inheritance and innovation of civilizations, and strengthening international people-to-people exchanges and cooperation".

A party and its authority rests on winning the hearts and minds of the people. What the public opposes and hates, we must address and resolve.

[M]aterial and cultural needs grown; demands for democracy, rule of law, fairness and justice, security, and a better environment are also increasing each day.

— Xi Jinping during a speech in 2017

Xi supports a socialist artistic revival, including the promotion of patriotic art and red classics. Since the 18th Party Congress, Xi has emphasized utilizing red resources, telling red stories, and inheriting red genes. On 15 October 2014, Xi emulated the Yan'an Forum with his 'Speech at the Forum on Literature and Art.' Consistent with Mao's view in the Yan'an Talks, Xi believes works of art should be judged by political criteria. This view rejects the concept of art-for-art's-sake and contends that art should serve the goal of national rejuvenation. In 2021, Xi quoted the Yan'an Talks during the opening ceremony of the 11th National Congress of the China Federation of Literary and Art Circles and the 10th National Congress of the Chinese Writers Association. Xi criticizes market-driven art which he deems sensationalist, particularly works which "exaggerate society's dark side" for profit. He ordered the arts industry to "tell China's stories and spread Chinese voices to strengthen the country's international communication capacity." Xi states that Chinese writers should follow the Party's leadership, serve the cause of socialism, and "let people see the good, feel hope, [and] have dreams". Xi is a proponent of the "Sinicization of Chinese religion". At the 19th Party Congress, Xi stated, "We will fully implement the Party's basic policy on religious affairs, uphold the principle that religions in China must be Chinese in orientation and provide active guidance to religions so that they can adapt themselves to a socialist society."

=== Ideology ===
Xi Jinping delivering a speech on 30 June 2021 at the 100th anniversary of the CCP's founding

Xi has said that "only socialism can save China." Xi has also declared socialism with Chinese characteristics to be the "only correct path to realize national rejuvenation." According to BBC News, while the CCP was perceived to have abandoned its communist ideology since it initiated economic reforms in the 1970s, Xi is believed by some observers to be more believing in the "idea of a communist project", and was described as a Marxist–Leninist by former Australian prime minister Kevin Rudd. Xi's emphasis on prioritizing ideology has included re-asserting the Party's goal of eventually realizing communism and reprimanding those who dismiss communism as impractical or irrelevant. Xi described the communist ideal as the "calcium" in a Party member's spine, without which the Party member would suffer the "osteoporosis" of political decay and be unable to stand upright.

Xi supports stronger Party leadership, saying "government, the military, society and schools, north, south, east and west – the party leads them all." During the 100th anniversary of the CCP in 2021, he said that "without the Communist Party of China, there would be no new China and no national rejuvenation," and that "the leadership of the Party is the defining feature of socialism with Chinese characteristics and constitutes the greatest strength of this system." Xi has said that China, despite many setbacks, has achieved great progress under the CCP, saying that "socialism with Chinese characteristics has become the standard-bearer of 21st-century socialist development." However, he also warned that it will take a long time for China under the CCP to complete its rejuvenation, and during this timeframe, party members must be vigilant to not let CCP rule collapse. For the CCP to maintain "purity" and "eternal youth" and not led Party rule to collapse, Xi has called on cadres to engage in self-revolution, through which the CCP roots out corruption and ineffectual officials. Xi has said that "our party is so large, and our country, so huge–it is such that if the Party Central lacks the sole authority to make decisions, nothing can be achieved", comparing the Party Central to the CCP's "cerebrum" and the "central nervous system", and said it "should have the sole authority in making decisions".

Xi has spoken out against "historical nihilism", meaning historical viewpoints that challenge the official line of the CCP. Xi said that one of the reasons for the collapse of the Soviet Union has been historical nihilism. Subscribing to the view that socialism will eventually triumph over capitalism, Xi has said "Marx and Engels's analysis of the basic contradictions of capitalist society is not outdated, nor is the historical materialist view that capitalism is bound to die out and socialism bound to win." Xi has called for the further Sinicization of Marxism, referring to adapting Marxism to the Chinese context. In July 2021, he formulated the Two Integrations, calling for integrating Marxism with China's specific conditions and China's traditional culture. Xi has called on CCP members to "remain true to our original aspiration", meaning to work for the happiness and well-being of the Chinese people and the rejuvenation of China, and launched an educational campaign for that goal from 2019 to 2020. Xi has said that the "feeling of devotion and sense of attachment to our motherland is a duty and responsibility of every Chinese", while adding "In contemporary China, the essence of patriotism is loving the country, the Party and socialism all at the same time".

China's success proves that socialism is not dead. It is thriving. Just imagine this: had socialism failed in China, had our communist party collapsed like the party in the Soviet Union, then global socialism would lapse into a long dark age. And communism, like Karl Marx once said, would be a haunting spectre lingering in limbo.

— Xi Jinping during a speech in 2018

Xi has ruled out a multi-party system for China, saying that "constitutional monarchy, imperial restoration, parliamentarism, a multi-party system and a presidential system, we considered them, tried them, but none worked." However, Xi considers China to be a democracy, saying that "China's socialist democracy is the most comprehensive, genuine and effective democracy." China's definition of democracy is different from liberal democracies and is rooted in Marxism–Leninism, and is based on the phrases people's democratic dictatorship and democratic centralism. Xi has additionally coined the term whole-process people's democracy which he said was about having "the people as masters". Foreign analysts and observers have widely disputed that China is a democracy, saying that it is a one-party authoritarian state and Xi an authoritarian leader. Xi has sometimes referred to as "traditionalist" or "neo-authoritarian". Xi has additionally rejected Westernisation as the only way to modernize, instead promoting CCP terms as Chinese modernization.

=== Xi Jinping Thought ===
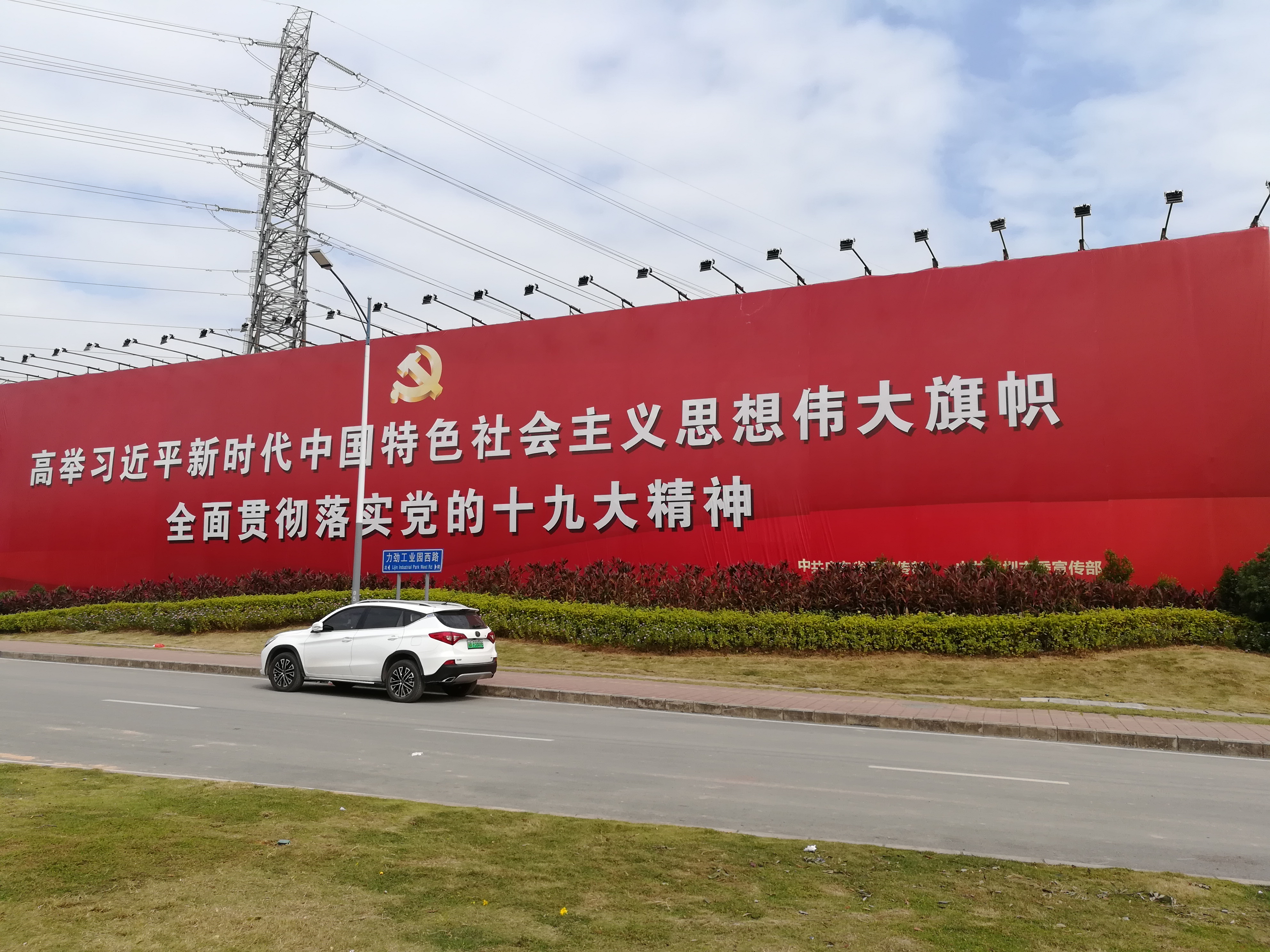
A billboard promoting Xi Jinping Thought in Shenzhen

In January 2013, Politburo Standing Committee member Liu Yunshan referred to Xi's speech for the 18th Party National Congress as the "General Secretary Xi Jinping's Series of Important Speeches". In October 2017, the CCP Central Committee announced that Xi's political philosophies were developed into the "Xi Jinping Thought on Socialism with Chinese Characteristics for a New Era". Xi first made mention of the "Thought on Socialism with Chinese Characteristics for a New Era" in his opening day speech delivered to the 19th Party Congress in October 2017. His Politburo Standing Committee colleagues, in their own reviews of Xi's keynote address at the Congress, prepended the name "Xi Jinping" in front of "Thought". On 24 October 2017, at its closing session, the 19th Party Congress approved the incorporation of Xi Jinping Thought into the Constitution of the CCP, while in March 2018, the National People's Congress amended the state constitution to include Xi Jinping Thought.

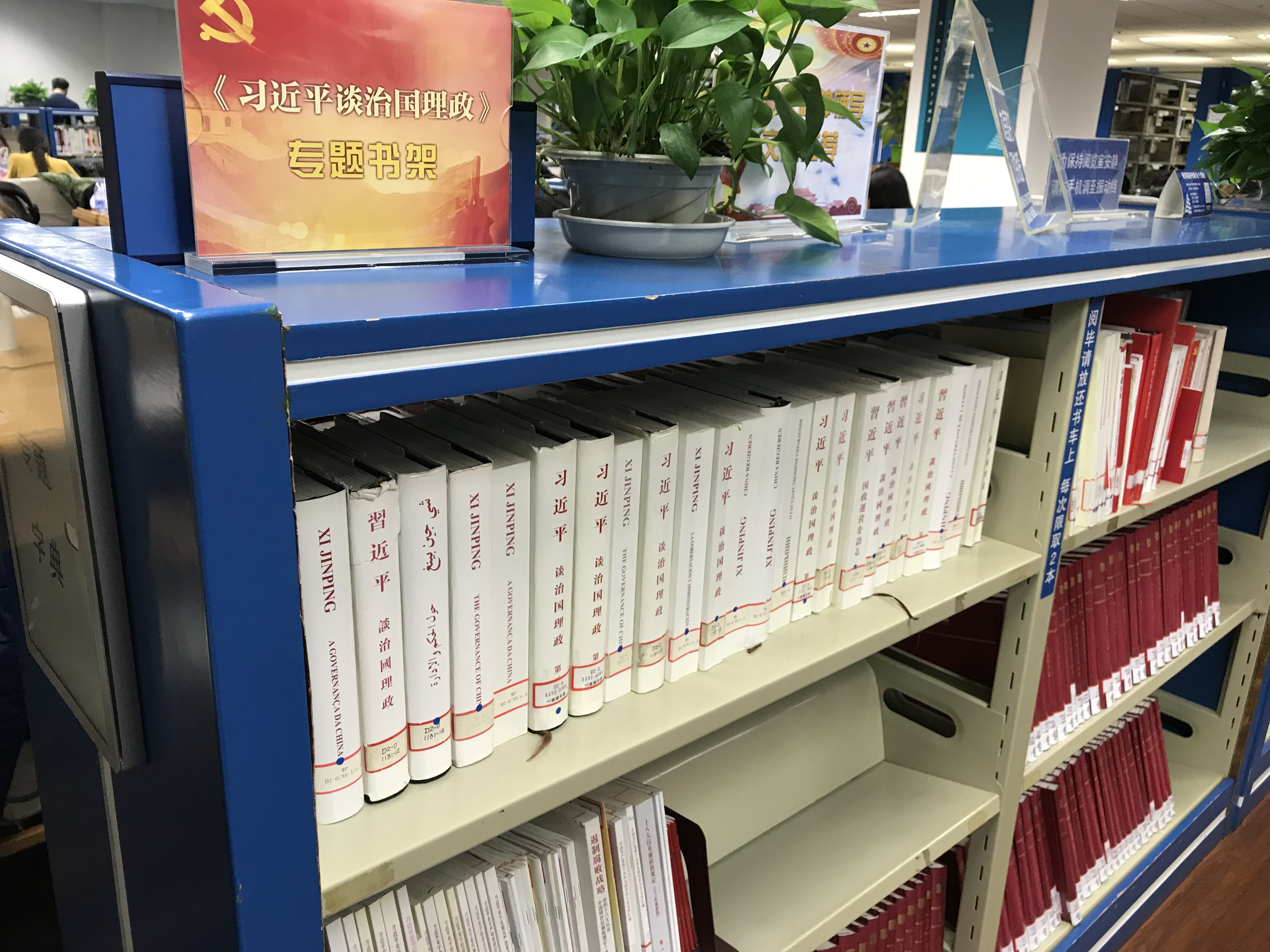
The Governance of China in different languages presented at Shanghai Library

Xi himself has described the Thought as part of the broad framework created around socialism with Chinese characteristics, a term coined by Deng Xiaoping that places China in the primary stage of socialism. The thought's main elements are summarized in the ten affirmations, the fourteen commitments, and the thirteen areas of achievements. In official party documentation and pronouncements by Xi's colleagues, the Thought is said to be a continuation of Marxism–Leninism, Mao Zedong Thought, Deng Xiaoping Theory, the Three Represents, and the Scientific Outlook on Development, as part of a series of guiding ideologies that embody "Marxism adopted to Chinese conditions" and contemporary considerations. It has additionally been described as the "21st century Marxism" by two professors in the Central Party School of the CCP. Wang Huning, a top political adviser and a close ally of Xi, has been described as pivotal to developing Xi Jinping Thought. The concepts and context behind Xi Jinping Thought are elaborated in Xi's The Governance of China book series, published by the Foreign Languages Press for an international audience. Volume one was published in September 2014, followed by volume two in November 2017. Xuexi Qiangguo, an app for teaching Xi Jinping Thought had become the most popular smartphone app in China in 2019, as the CCP launched a new campaign that calls on its cadres to immerse themselves in the political doctrine every day.

== Personal life ==
=== Family ===
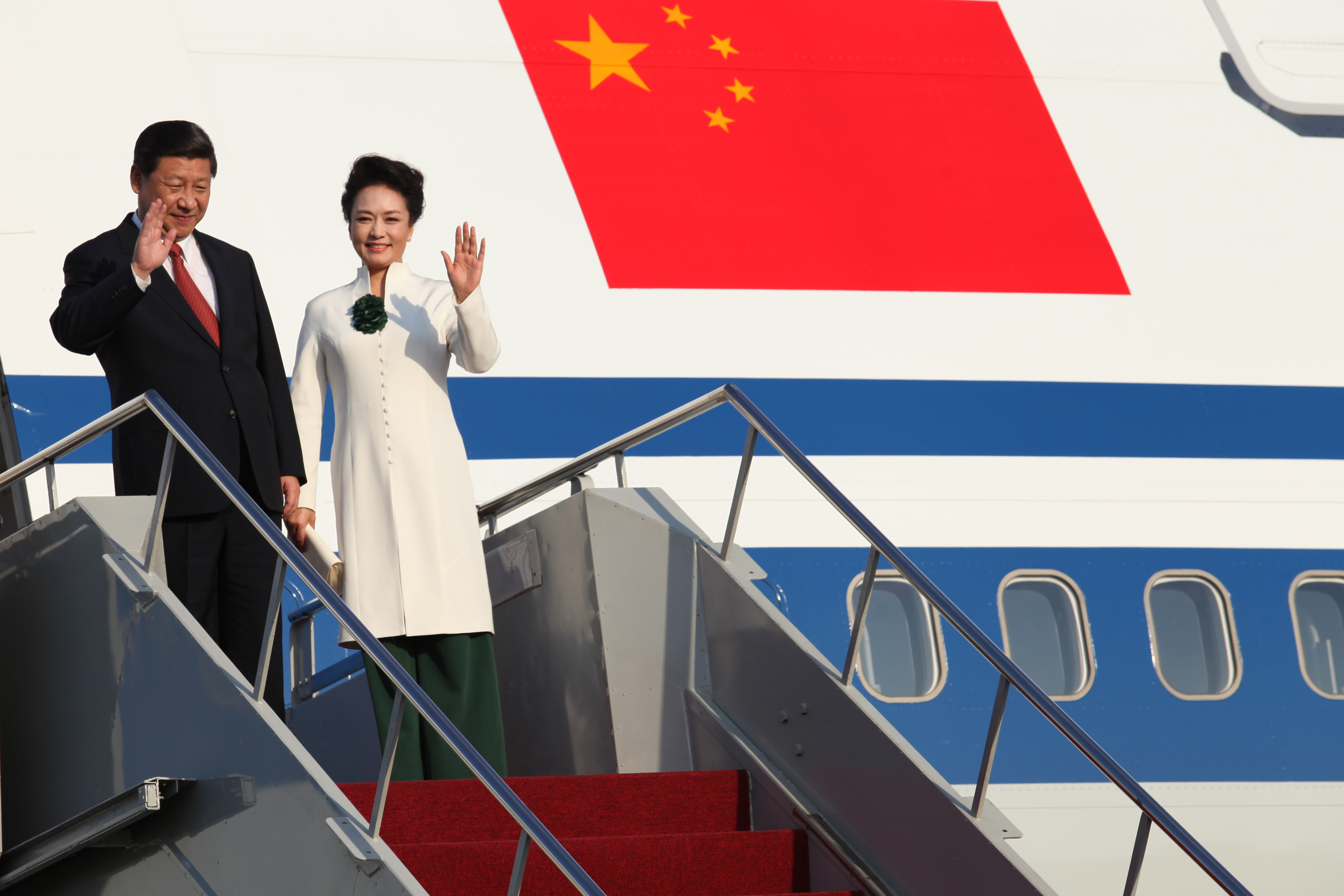
Xi and his wife Peng Liyuan landing in Bali to attend the APEC Indonesia 2013 in 2013

Xi's first marriage was to Ke Lingling, the daughter of Ke Hua, China's ambassador to the United Kingdom in the early 1980s. They divorced within a few years. The two were said to fight "almost every day," and after the divorce, Ke moved to the UK. In 1987, Xi married famed folk singer Peng Liyuan. Xi and Peng were introduced by friends as many Chinese couples were in the 1980s. Peng had gained fame in the 1980s and remained far better known in China than Xi until the latter emerged as a likely successor in the late 2000s. The couple frequently lived apart due largely to their separate professional lives. Peng has played a much more visible role as China's "first lady" compared to her predecessors; for example, Peng hosted U.S. first lady Michelle Obama on her high-profile visit to China in March 2014. Xi and Peng have a daughter named Xi Mingze, who graduated from Harvard University in the spring of 2015. While at Harvard, she used a pseudonym and studied Psychology and English. Xi's family has a home in Jade Spring Hill, a garden and residential area in north-western Beijing run by the CMC.

In June 2012, Bloomberg News reported that members of Xi's extended family including his sister Qi Qiaoqiao have substantial business interests, although there was no evidence he had intervened to assist them. The Bloomberg News website was blocked in mainland China in response to the article about his family's wealth and the sales of Bloomberg Terminals in China slowed, while access to the files of Qinchuan Dadi, which was Qi's investment vehicle, was shut down. Relatives of highly placed Chinese officials, including seven current and former members of the Politburo, have been named in the Panama Papers, including Deng Jiagui, Xi's brother-in-law. Deng had two shell companies in the British Virgin Islands while Xi was a member of the Politburo Standing Committee, which became dormant by the time Xi became CCP general secretary in 2012. According to The New York Times in 2012, after coming to power, Xi told his family to get out of their investments and that Qi Qiaoqiao and Deng Jiagui had divested their investments in at least 10 companies. In 2015, Wang Jianlin, the leader of the company Dalian Wanda, defended Qi and Deng, saying that they sold their shares in the company two months before the IPO in October 2014. The New York Times commented that this information is conflicted with official documents, which state that Qi and Deng transferred the ownership of the holding company to one of their employees in October 2013.

=== Personality ===
Peng described Xi as hardworking and down-to-earth: "When he comes home, I've never felt as if there's some leader in the house. In my eyes, he's just my husband." In 1992, The Washington Post journalist Lena H. Sun had an interview with Xi, then CCP secretary of Fuzhou; Sun described Xi as considerably more at ease and confident than many officials his age, and said that he talked without consulting notes. He was described in a 2011 The Washington Post article by those who know him as "pragmatic, serious, cautious, hard-working, down to earth and low-key." He was described as a good hand at problem solving and "seemingly uninterested in the trappings of high office." The Chinese state media has also cast him as a fatherly figure and a man of the people, determined to stand up for Chinese interests.

=== Interests ===
Unlike previous Chinese leaders, Chinese state media has given a more encompassing view of Xi's private life, although still strictly controlled. According to Xinhua News Agency, Xi would swim one kilometer and walk every day as long as there was time, and is interested in foreign writers, especially Russian. Some of his favorite foreign authors include Leo Tolstoy, Mikhail Sholokhov, Victor Hugo, Honoré de Balzac, Johann Wolfgang von Goethe and Jack London. Xi reportedly invoked What Is to Be Done? by Nikolay Chernyshevsky as a guide during the 16th BRICS summit. Xi is reported to also like films and TV shows such as Saving Private Ryan, Sleepless in Seattle, The Godfather, and Game of Thrones, and he has praised Chinese independent film-maker Jia Zhangke. Xi is also known to be an avid football fan and gave impetus to the Great Chinese Football Dream after stating that he had three wishes for the China national team: to qualify for a World Cup, host a World Cup and win a World Cup by 2050.

== Public image ==
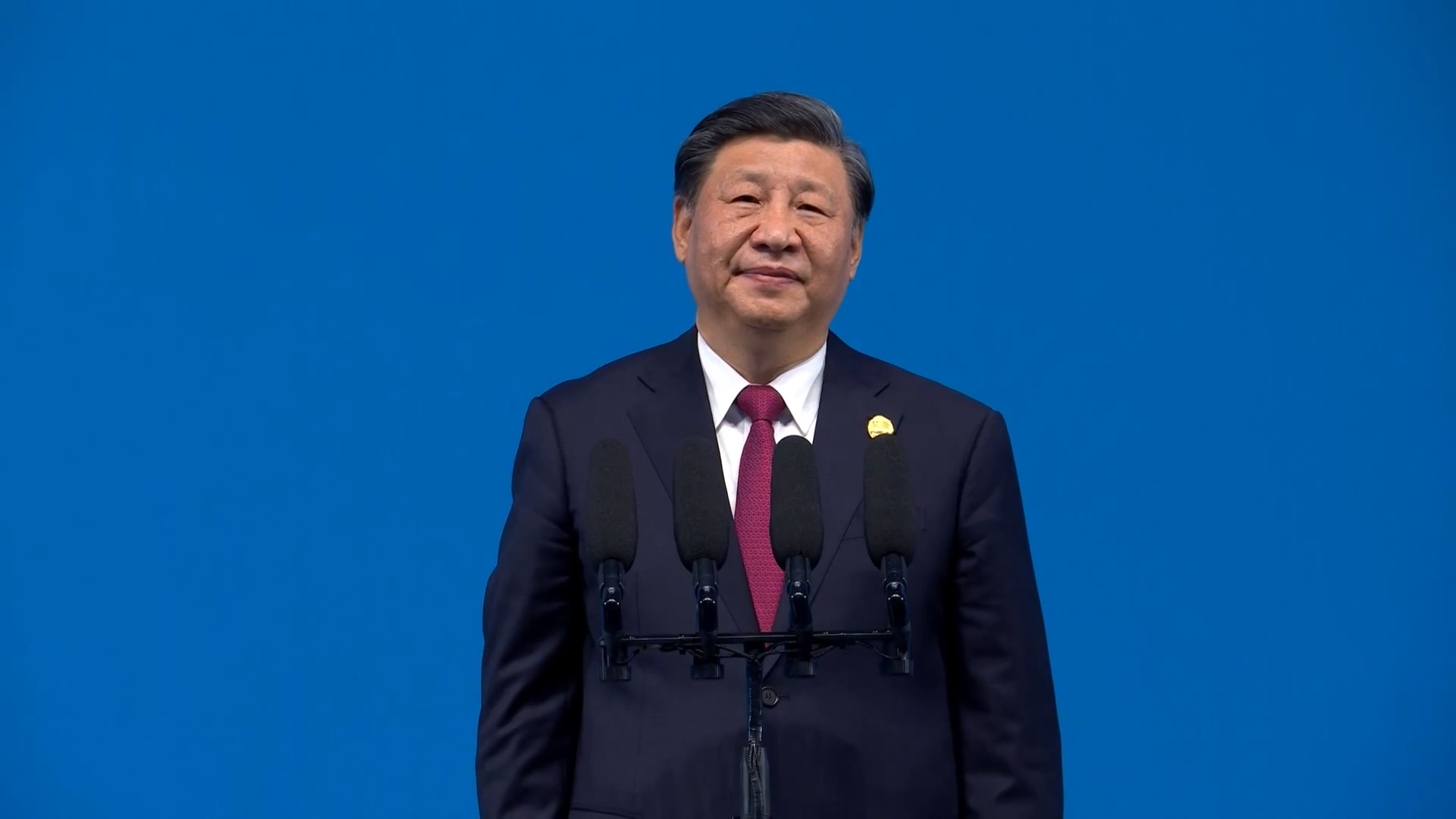
Xi declaring the 2021 Summer World University Games in Chengdu open

It is hard to gauge the opinion of the Chinese public on Xi, as no independent surveys exist in China and mentions of his name in social media are heavily censored. However, he is believed to be widely popular in the country. According to a 2014 poll co-sponsored by the Harvard Kennedy School's Ash Center for Democratic Governance and Innovation, Xi ranked 9 out of 10 in domestic approval ratings. A YouGov poll released in July 2019 found that about 22% of people in mainland China list Xi as the person they admire the most, a plurality, although this figure was less than 5% for residents of Hong Kong.

In the spring of 2026, the Pew Research Center made a survey on confidence on Xi among 36 countries, which indicated that a median 34% have confidence in Xi to do the right thing regarding world affairs, meanwhile a median of 53% have no confidence; these numbers are higher than those of Russian President Vladimir Putin (31% confidence, 65% no confidence) and United States President Donald Trump (23% confidence, 76% no confidence).

In 2017, The Economist named him the most powerful person in the world. In 2018, Forbes ranked him as the most powerful and influential person in the world, replacing Russian President Vladimir Putin, who had been ranked so for five consecutive years. In 2022, Time also named Xi as the world's most powerful person, writing Xi "is the first among 1.4 billion people. If not among 7.7 billion." Since 2013, Reporters Without Borders, an international non-profit and non-governmental organization with the stated aim of safeguarding the right to freedom of information, included Xi among the list of press freedom predators.

== Honours ==
Xi has received state honours from several countries, including the Order of the Golden Eagle from Kazakhstan and the Order of the Crown from Tajikistan.

== Select works ==
- Xi, Jinping (1999). Theory and Practice on Modern Agriculture. Fuzhou: Fujian Education Press.
- Xi, Jinping (2007). Zhijiang Xinyu. Hangzhou: Zhengjiang People's Publishing House. ISBN 9787213035081.
- Xi, Jinping (2014). The Governance of China. Vol. I. Beijing: Foreign Languages Press. ISBN 9787119090573.
- Xi, Jinping (2014). Reader of General Secretary Xi Jinping's Series of Important Speeches. Vol. I. Beijing: People's Publishing House & Study Publishing House. ISBN 9787119090573.
- Xi, Jinping (2016). Reader of General Secretary Xi Jinping's Series of Important Speeches. Vol. II. Beijing: People's Publishing House & Study Publishing House. ISBN 9787514706284.
- Xi, Jinping (2017). The Governance of China. Vol. II. Beijing: Foreign Languages Press. ISBN 9787119111643.
- Xi, Jinping (2019). The Belt And Road Initiative. Beijing: Foreign Languages Press. ISBN 978-7119119960.
- Xi, Jinping (2020). The Governance of China. Vol. III. Beijing: Foreign Languages Press. ISBN 9787119124117.
- Xi, Jinping (2020). On Propaganda and Ideological Work of Communist Party. Beijing: Central Party Literature Press. ISBN 9787507347791.
- Xi, Jinping (2021). On History of the Communist Party of China. Beijing: Central Party Literature Press. ISBN 9787507348033.
- Xi, Jinping (2022). The Governance of China. Vol. IV. Beijing: Foreign Languages Press. ISBN 9787119130941.

== Notes ==
Political offices
Preceded by He Guoqiang	Governor of Fujian; 1999–2002	Succeeded by Lu Zhangong
Preceded by Chai Songyue	Governor of Zhejiang; 2002–2003	Succeeded by Lü Zushan
Preceded by Li Zemin	Director of the Standing Committee of the Zhejiang Provincial People's Congress; 2003–2007	Succeeded by Yu Guoxing
Preceded by Zeng Qinghong	Vice President of China; 2008–2013	Succeeded by Li Yuanchao
Preceded by Xu Caihou; Guo Boxiong	Vice Chairman of the Central Military Commission; 2010–2013	Succeeded by Fan Changlong; Xu Qiliang
Preceded by Hu Jintao	President of China; 2013–present	Incumbent
Preceded by Hu Jintao	Chairman of the PRC Central Military Commission; 2013–present	Incumbent
Party political offices
Preceded by Zhang Dejiang	Party Secretary of Zhejiang; 2002–2007	Succeeded by Zhao Hongzhu
Preceded by Han Zheng	Party Secretary of Shanghai; 2007	Succeeded by Yu Zhengsheng
Preceded by Hu Jintao	General Secretary of the Chinese Communist Party; 2012–present	Incumbent
Preceded by Hu Jintao	Chairman of the CCP Central Military Commission; 2012–present	Incumbent
Preceded by Hu Jintao	Director of the Central Foreign Affairs Commission; 2012–present	Incumbent
Preceded by Hu Jintao	Director of the Central Financial and Economic Affairs Commission; 2013–present	Incumbent
New office	Director of the Central Comprehensively Deepening Reforms Commission; 2013–present	Incumbent
New office	Chairman of the Central National Security Commission; 2014–present	Incumbent
Diplomatic posts
Preceded by Susilo Bambang Yudhoyono	Chairperson of APEC; 2014	Succeeded by Benigno Aquino III
Preceded by Recep Tayyip Erdoğan	Chairperson of the Group of 20; 2016	Succeeded by Angela Merkel
Preceded by Lee Jun Myung	Chairperson of APEC; 2026	Succeeded by Tô Lâm
Academic offices
Preceded by Zeng Qinghong	President of the Central Party School; 2007–2013	Succeeded by Liu Yunshan
Order of precedence
Preceded by First as CCP General Secretary	Rank of the Communist Party and the Government; 18th & 19th Politburo Standing Committee	Succeeded by Li Keqiang as Premier
Preceded by First as CCP General Secretary	Rank of the Communist Party and the Government; 20th Politburo Standing Committee	Succeeded by Li Qiang as Premier
