= Uno, dos, tres =

Uno, dos, tres ('one, two, three' in Spanish, Chamorro and Chavacano) may refer to:

== Arts and entertainment ==
=== Music ===
- ¡Uno!, ¡Dos!, and ¡Tré!, albums by Green Day
- Uno Dos Tres 1-2-3, a 1966 album by Willie Bobo
- Uno Dos Tres, a 2022 EP by Ben Sterling
- "Uno, Dos, Tres", a 2008 song by Motel
- "Uno Dos Tres", a 1963 song by Ken Boothe and Stranger Cole
- "Uno, Dos, Tres", a 2004 song by Los Guardianes del Amor
- "Uno Dos Tres", a 2021 song by Kap G
- "Uno, dos, tres, cuatro", a 1994 song by Javier Álvarez
- "Uno dos tres", a song by Mijares from the 2009 album Vivir Así
- "Uno Dos Tres", a 2022 song by IQ and Massimo
- "Uno, Dos, Tres", a track on the 2011 soundtrack album My Week with Marilyn
- "Uno Dos Tres", a 2008 song by Jackpot on the Service record label
- "Uno, Dos, Tres + Digital Boogie", a song by Space Cowboy from the 2005 album Big City Nights
- "(Un, Dos, Tres) María", a CD single of Ricky Martin's song "María" and the Pablo Flores remix of the song

=== Other uses in arts and entertainment ===
- Uno, dos, tres... dispara otra vez, Spanish title for the 1973 film Fuzzy the Hero
- Un, dos, tres... responda otra vez, a Spanish TV game show
- Uno Dos Tres, a fictional character in TV series Pintados
- Uno, Dos, Tres: One, Two, Three, a 1996 book by Pat Mora

== Other uses ==
- Uno, dos, tres,..., various alternate names for the children's game Statues
- "Uno! Dos! Tres!", episode 21 of Lucha Underground Trios Championship wrestling
- Uno, Dos, Tres and Cinco, numbered lakes in Ponce, Puerto Rico
- Uno, Dos and Tres, members of The Council of Trabajadores, alumni at the Philippine Wrestling Revolution
- 2016–17 Segunda División of Spanish football, known as LaLiga 1|2|3
- Gallery Uno, Dos, Tres, a 1979 solo exhibition by Bolivian painter and sculptor Rodolfo Ayoroa in San Salvador, El Salvador

== See also ==
- Uno (disambiguation)
- Dos (disambiguation)
- Tres (disambiguation)
- 123 (disambiguation)
- 1234 (disambiguation)
- 12345 (disambiguation)
- 123456 (disambiguation)
- Spanish orthography § Numerals
- Count off
- ¡Uno, dos, tres, Tequila!, a bridge in the song "Salsa Tequila" by Anders Nilsen
- Unos, dos, tres, catorce! ('one, two, three, fourteen'), a count-off in U2's song "Vertigo"
- De Campo Uno-Dos-Tres Orihinal, a form of Filipino martial arts
- 123 Andrés (pronounced uno dos tres, Andrés), a Colombian children's music duo
- ¡Uno…dos…tres…fuera!, a 1968 painting by Colombian artist, researcher and professor Nirma Zárate
- Diez Diez Uno Dos Tres, a Spanish slogan for the Latino version of a USA long distance phone service called 10-10-123 by AT&T
- 一二三 (disambiguation)
