= Tres =

Tres may refer to:

- Tres (instrument), a Cuban musical instrument
- Tres, Trentino, municipality in Italy
- Tres (2014 film), a Filipino anthology drama film based on short stories
- "Tres" (song) by Juanes
- "Tres", a song by Líbido from their album Hembra
- TrES, the Trans-Atlantic Exoplanet Survey
- Templi Resurgentes Equites Synarchici, a fictional secret society in the novel Foucault's Pendulum
- MTV Tres, an American cable network which targets programming towards young Hispanic-Americans
- Tea Research and Extension Station, Taiwan
- Tres (Fiel a la Vega album), 1999
- Tres (Álvaro Torres album), 1985
- Tres (poetry collection), a 2000 collection of poems by Roberto Bolaño

== See also ==
- Los Tres, Chilean rock band
- TRE3S, 2011 album by Mexican indie rock band Chikita Violenta
- Tress (disambiguation)
- Uno, dos, tres (disambiguation)
