= 123 =

123 may refer to:

- The first three positive Arabic numerals
- 123 (number), the natural number following 122 and preceding 124
- AD 123, a year of the Julian calendar, in the second century AD
- 123 BC, a year of the pre-Julian Roman calendar

123 or 1-2-3 may also refer to:

== Brands ==
- 1-2-3 (fuel station), in Norfolk
- Lotus 1-2-3, a computer spreadsheet program
- .123, a file extension used by Lotus 1-2-3
- Jell-O 1-2-3, a dessert

== Film, TV and books ==
- One, Two, Three, a 1961 film by Billy Wilder
- One Two Three, a 2008 Indian comedy film
- 123 (film), a 2002 Indian Tamil-language romantic comedy
- 123, 2016 Philippines film by Carlo Obispo at 12th Cinemalaya Independent Film Festival

== Music ==
- 1,2,3, a band from Pittsburgh later reformed as Animal Scream
- 1-2-3, a band from Edinburgh later known as Clouds
- One, Two, Three, a 1980s electronic disco group produced by Bobby Orlando

=== Albums ===
- 1-2-3 (APO Hiking Society album)
- 1-2-3 (Howling Hex album)
- I-II-III (Icon of Coil albums), a set of three albums released in 2006

=== Songs ===
- "1-2-3" (Len Barry song), 1965
- "1, 2, 3" (Sofía Reyes song), 2018
- "1-2-3" (The Chimes song), 1990
- "1-2-3" (Gloria Estefan and Miami Sound Machine song), 1988
- "1, 2, 3!" (Seungri song), 2018
- "123" (Nikki Laoye song), 2012
- "1 2 3" (Moneybagg Yo song), 2020
- "One, Two, Three" (Ch!pz song), 2005
- "One Two Three / The Matenrō Show", a 2012 song by Morning Musume
- "One, Two, Three, Go!", a 2008 song by Belanova
- "123", a song by Jess Glynne from the 2018 album Always In Between
- "1. 2. 3. ...", a 2006 song by Bela B. and Charlotte Roche from the album Bingo
- "1-2-3! (Train with Me)", a song by Playahitty
- "1・2・3", a 2019 song by After the Rain from the Japanese release of the TV series Pokémon Journeys: The Series
- "1, 2, 3", a 2010 song by Christopher Von Uckermann from Somos
- "One Two Three", a 2012 song by E-girls

== Other uses ==
- 1-2-3 inning, in baseball
- 123 (interbank network), a shared cash network in Egypt
- Japan Air Lines Flight 123, which crashed in 1985 near Tokyo
- 123 Brunhild, a main-belt asteroid
- IRT Broadway–Seventh Avenue Line, New York City Subway line served by the 1, 2, and 3 trains
- One2Three Naval Architects, marine design company

== See also ==
- 123rd (disambiguation)
- 1234 (disambiguation)
- 1 + 2 + 3 + 4 + ⋯
- 321 (disambiguation)
- 12/3 (disambiguation)
- A123 (disambiguation)
- Unbitrium, a hypothetical chemical element with atomic number 123
- Uno, dos, tres (disambiguation)
- 一二三 (disambiguation)
