= 一二三 =

一二三, meaning "one, two, three", may refer to:

- Hifumi, Japanese given name and surname
- Ichi-ni-san, a local yaku in traditional Japanese card game Oicho-Kabu
- "One Two Three", a track in Chinese television series Only Side by Side with You Original Television Soundtrack

== Other uses ==
- 123 Democratic Alliance (一二三民主聯盟), political party in Hong Kong
- OTT Airlines (一二三航空公司), Chinese airline
- YES stroke alphabetical order (一二三漢字筆順排檢法), Chinese character sorting method

== See also ==
- 123 (disambiguation)
- Uno, dos, tres (disambiguation)
