= 3-2 =

3-2 may refer to:

- Mr. 3-2 (1972–2016), American rapper
- 3-2 (song), 2020 single by Japanese idol girl group HKT48
- 3-2 engineering, dual degree programs providing a BA from a home institution and BS in engineering from a partner school
- Three-two pull down, term used in filmmaking and television production for the post-production process of transferring film to video
- 3-2 zone, a zone defense arrangement in various sports
- Full count, in baseball

== See also ==
- 32 (disambiguation)
- 3-2-1 (disambiguation)
