= Ek Do Teen =

Ek Do Teen (lit. 'One Two three') may refer to these in Indian cinema:

- Ek Do Teen (film), a 1953 Hindi comedy film
- "Ek Do Teen" (song), a Hindi song from the film Tezaab and Baaghi 2

== See also ==
- 123 (disambiguation)
