= Hifumi =

- Gender: Both

Origin
- Origin: Japanese
- Meaning: Different meanings depending on the kanji used

Hifumi (written: 一二三) is a unisex Japanese given name, as well as a family name.

Notable people with the given name include:

- Hifumi Abe (阿部 一二三; born 1997), Japanese judoka
- Hifumi Katō (加藤 一二三; born 1940), Japanese shogi player
- Hifumi Shimoyama (下山 一二三; 1930–2023), Japanese classical composer
- Hifumi Suzuki (鈴木 十二美, born 1957), Japanese Paralympic archer

Notable people with the family name include:

- Shinta Hifumi (一二三 慎太; born 1992), Japanese baseball player
- Tomoko Hifumi (一二三 朋子; born 1959), Japanese educator

== Fictional characters ==
- Hifumi Ajitani (阿慈谷 ヒフミ), a character in the role-playing game Blue Archive
- Hifumi Inokai (猪飼 ヒフミ), a character in the manga anime series Koi Koi Seven
- Hifumi Izanami (伊弉冉 一二三), a character in the multimedia project Hypnosis Mic: Division Rap Battle
- Hifumi Ōshibu (大渋 一二三), a character in the manga and anime series Sanda
- Hifumi Takimoto (滝本 ひふみ), a character in the manga and anime series New Game!
- Hifumi Togo (東郷 一二三), a character in the video game Persona 5
- Hifumi Yamada (山田 一二三), a character in the visual novel Danganronpa: Trigger Happy Havoc
