= 12345 =

12345 may refer to:

- The ZIP code exclusive to the General Electric plant in Schenectady, New York
- Saraighat Express, a superfast train in India with number 12345
- The year 12,345 in the 13th millennium AD
- The minor planet (12345) 1993 FT8
- 12345 hotline, a telephone number in China to answer questions and complaints related to local government
