= 1234 (disambiguation) =

1234 is a year.

1234, 1, 2, 3, 4, etc. also may refer to:

== Musical works ==
=== Albums ===
- 1234 (Ronnie Wood album) (1981)
- 1234 (Propaganda album) (1990)
- 1-2-3-4 (Ray Drummond album) (1997)
- 1,2,3,4, by The Jeevas (2002)
- One Two Three Four (EP) by The Saints, 1977

=== Songs ===
- "1, 2, 3, 4 (Sumpin' New)", 1995 song by Coolio
- "1234" (Feist song), 2007 from The Reminder
- "1, 2, 3, 4" (Plain White T's song), 2009, by Plain White T's
- "1234", song by Golden Boy with Miss Kittin from Or
- "1234", song by Galantis from The Devil's Tax Return

== Other uses ==
- 1234 Elyna, main-belt asteroid
- 1-2-3-4 (book), 2015 photography book by Anton Corbijn
- One Two Three Four: The Beatles in Time, a book by Craig Brown
- 1234 (number), a natural number

== See also ==
- Fantastic Four: 1234, a Fantastic Four comic by Grant Morrison and Jae Lee
- 4, 3, 2, 1 (disambiguation)
- 1-2-3 (disambiguation)
