= 3/12 =

3/12 may refer to:

- March 12 (month-day date notation)
  - 1993 Bombay bombings, 12 March 1993 terrorist attacks in Bombay, India by the D-Company mafia
- December 3 (day-month date notation)
- 3rd Battalion, 12th Marines, an artillery battalion of the United States Marine Corps

== See also ==
- 12/3 (disambiguation)
- 312 (disambiguation)
