= Chikita Violenta =

Mexican indie rock band

- Origin: Mexico City, Mexico
- Genre: Indie rock
- Years active: 2000–present
- Labels: Arts & Crafts; Arts & Crafts México
- Members: Andrés Velasco; Armando David; Esteban Suarez; Luis Arce
- Website: http://chikitaviolenta.com/

Chikita Violenta is a Mexican indie rock band from Mexico City. The band members are Luis Arce, Andrés Velasco, Esteban Suárez and Armando David. They all met in high school between 1994 and 1997. Since the beginning of the band, Chikita Violenta looked for a sound close to the college rock, which can be related to bands such as Pavement, Sonic Youth, Built To Spill and Tortoise.

== History ==
In 2003, the band self-produced their first album, Chikita Violenta. Two years later, the band contacted the well known producer Dave Newfeld who has worked with important indie bands like Apostle of Hustle, Broken Social Scene, Super Furry Animals and Los Campesinos! Their second album, The Stars and Suns Sessions, was named after Newfeld's Toronto studio. With this album, Chikita Violenta went on tour in Mexico City and in several cities across the west coast of the U.S. The band also performed two years in a row in the music festival SXSW.

The band's video for the single "Laydown" was listed by Spin Magazine as a "Must see" in August 2008, for its "cute" use of 1970's home movies and "novel" mixing with modern-day footage of family members, all cut together into a "generation-spanning holiday party".Spin wrote that it "takes the cuteness and the novelty and blows them up like the Stay Puft Marshmallow Man.

In the end of 2009 and early 2010 the band worked again with Newfeld and recorded their third album, TRE3S. The album was recorded over three trips to Canada and includes collaborations with Loel Campbell from Wintersleep, Tony Nesbitt-Larking from The Most Serene Republic and Lisa Lobsinger of Broken Social Scene. In the summer of 2010 Chikita Violenta was the opening act in 23 cities on Built to Spill’s and Ra Ra Riot’s tour, the band signed with Toronto label Arts & Crafts for future album releases, and it was selected as an Editor's Choice by the New Haven Register.

TRE3S was released in early 2011, to a mix of mild and enthusiastic reviews. Spin magazine gave the album 7 out of 10 stars, stating "While the production's scope doesn't quite fit Chikita Violenta's knack for scrappy Superchunk-style guitar pop, the busy shimmer usually complements the songs' energy instead of burying it." Scott Fallon of the Bergen County Record called it "the first great album of 2011", and, noting producer Newfeld's work with Broken Social Scene, wrote "Chikita Violenta has taken the whole lo-fi anthemic pop thing to heart."

== Discography ==
=== Albums ===
- Chikita Violenta (2005)
- The Stars and Suns Sessions (2007)
- TRE3S (2010)

=== Singles ===
- "Turnaround" (2005)
- "Laydown" (2006)
- "War" (2007)
- "Tired" (2010)
- "Roni" (2010)
- "All I Need's a Little More" (2010)
- "Colapsomanía" (2013)
- "Implosión F" (2013)
- "Fáciles" (2014)
