= 12/3 =

12/3 may refer to:

- December 3 (month-day date notation)
- March 12 (day-month date notation)
  - 1993 Bombay bombings, 12 March 1993 terrorist attacks in Bombay, India by the D-Company mafia
- 12 shillings and 3 pence in UK predecimal currency

== See also ==
- 123 (disambiguation)
- 3/12 (disambiguation)
