= A123 =

A123 or variation may refer to:

- A123 Systems, battery manufacturer
- RFA Olna (A123), Royal Fleet Auxiliary Ol-class fast fleet tanker of the British Royal Navy
- Highway 123; see List of highways numbered 123
- OMB Circular A-123, a US Office of Management and Budget government circular that defines the management responsibilities for internal controls in Federal agencies

== See also ==
- 123 (disambiguation)
