= 321 (disambiguation) =

3 2 1, or 3, 2, 1 or 3-2-1 may refer to:

== Outside of music and entertainment ==
- The year 321 or year 321 BC
- 321 (number), the number 321
- 3-2-1 backup rule, a popular rule for computer data storage backup
- 321 Florentina, a main-belt asteroid
- BMW 321, a mid-sized luxury car
- British Rail Class 321

== Entertainment ==
- 3-2-1, a Yorkshire TV gameshow 1978–1988
- 321 (film), a 2026 Telugu-language romantic drama film
- 3,2,1... Frankie Go Boom, a 2012 film directed by Jordan Roberts
- 3-2-1 Contact, an American science educational television show that aired on PBS 1980–1988
- 3-2-1 Penguins!, a series of Christian computer-animated cartoons launched on November 14, 2000
- 3.2.1, a Thai pop music group under the Kamikaze label

== Music ==
=== Albums ===
- 3.2.1., an album by the rock band Zilch, 1998
- Three. Two. One., an album by Lennon Stella, 2020
- 3-2-1, a compilation album by Lior (singer), 2011

=== Songs ===
- "3 2 1" (Shinee song), a 2013 song by Shinee
- "3-2-1" (Brett Kissel song), a song by Brett Kissel from the 2013 album Started with a Song
- "3,2,1", a song by Tucker Wetmore
- "3, 2, 1" (24kGoldn song), 2021
- "321", a 2008 single by Disciple from Southern Hospitality
- "321", a song by Hedley from the 2005 album Hedley
- "321", a song by Scorpions from the 2007 album Humanity: Hour I

== See also ==
- 321st (disambiguation)
- 4, 3, 2, 1, various topics
- 5-4-3-2-1, a 1963 single by Manfred Mann
- Countdown, a sequence of backward counting to indicate the time remaining before an event is scheduled to occur
