= Tress =

Tress may refer to:

== People ==
- Arthur Tress (born 1940), American photographer
- David Tress (born 1955), British artist
- Kyle Tress (born 1940), American skeleton racer
- Mike Tress (1909-1967), national president of Agudath Israel of America
- Oliver Tress (born 1967), British businessman, founder of Oliver Bonas
- Ronald Tress (1915-2006), British professor and director
- Tress Bucyanayandi, Ugandan agriculturalist and politician
- Tress MacNeille (born 1951), American voice actress

== Other ==
- Tress 90 (1990-1996), meant as the replacement for INFOTRYGD, a case-worker support system, the largest IT failure in Norwegian history
- Ladies'-tresses, a genus of orchids
- Autumn lady's-tresses, the latest-blooming native species of orchid
- Tress Shop, Kentucky, an unincorporated community located in Todd County, Kentucky, United States
- Tress, a lock of hair
