= 312 (disambiguation) =

312 may refer to:

- The year 312 AD
- The year 312 BC
- The number 312
- China National Highway 312 (312国道), known as The Mother Road, a key east–west route running 4,967 km (3,086 mi) from Shanghai on the East China Sea to the western Chinese border with Kazakhstan in Central Asia.
- One of several Ferrari racing cars with 3 litre 12-cylinder engines:
  - The 312, 312B and 312T Formula One cars
  - The 312P and 312PB sportscar prototype class cars
- The British Rail Class 312 EMU
- 312 Pierretta, a main-belt asteroid
- The USS Young (DD-312) destroyer
- The Chicago Loop area code 312.
- 312 Urban Wheat, a beer brewed by the Chicago-based Goose Island Brewery

== See also ==
- 3/12 (disambiguation)
