= 1-2-3 (fuel station) =

Norwegian petrol-station brand

- Company type: Fuel station
- Founded: 5 December 2000
- Number of locations: 165
- Area served: Denmark, Norway; Baltic
- Owner: Statoil Fuel & Retail

1-2-3 is an unmanned fuel station chain in the Nordic and Baltic regions.

It was created in 2000, as the low cost extension of the Statoil chain, and owned by Statoil Fuel & Retail ASA. The first outlet was opened in Kaunas in December 2000. 65 outlets were planned in the Baltic, later to be supplemented by 107 outlets in Norway and Denmark. Unlike the Statoil stations, there are no franchisees, and all stations are vertically integrated.
