= 12345 hotline =

Local government telephone number in China

In China, 12345 is a nationwide specially-designated telephone number operated by local government switchboards to create and route citizen callers' non-emergency government-service work orders, requests, and inquiries. The hotline also gives local government officials insight into what citizens are thinking.

== History ==
The first local government hotline was set up in 1983, and many more were established in the 1990s as residential landlines became more prevalent. In 1999, the Ministry of Information Industry replaced the various local numbers with a single, nationwide 12345 number. Operators do not themselves have the ability to solve callers' problems, rather they act as a "bridge" to route callers to the correct department or official.

Chinese state media have promoted Jinan's hotline, which launched in 2008, as a model example, as it consolidated and replaced 38 distinct hotlines. Shanghai started its 12345 hotline in 2013. Guangzhou launched one in 2015.

The Chinese central government implemented nationwide standardization rules in July 2017, requiring 12345 hotlines to operate 24 hours a day, and to respond to calls within 15 seconds.

== See also ==
- 311 (telephone number); similar system in the United States and Canada
