= List of Hypnosis Mic: Division Rap Battle characters =

Hypnosis Mic: Division Rap Battle is a Japanese multimedia franchise featuring fictional rappers.

== Tokyo ==
=== Buster Bros!!! ===
Buster Bros!!! is a rap team from Ikebukuro consisting of the Yamada brothers. Their leader is Ichiro Yamada, and their team songs are "IKEBUKURO WEST GAME PARK", "Good Morning, Ikebukuro" (おはようイケブクロ, Ohayō Ikebukuro), "Re:start!!!", and "IKEBUKURO WEST BLOCK PARTY" Their official color is red.

Ichiro Yamada (山田 一郎, Yamada Ichirō)
Voiced by: Subaru Kimura
Stage Actor: Akira Takano, Ryoga Ishikawa
Ichiro uses the name MC.B.B. (pronounced "Em-Cee Big Brother"). He is 19 years old and the oldest of the Yamada brothers. While he's the leader of Buster Bros!!!, he used to be a member of The Dirty Dawg, as well as the Naughty Busters. His solo songs are "I am Ichiro" (俺が一郎, Ore ga Ichirō), "Break the Wall", "HIPHOPPIA", and "H era Reformation" (H歴維新, H-reki Ishin)
Jiro Yamada (山田 二郎, Yamada Jirō)
Voiced by: Haruki Ishiya
Stage Actor: Shōta Matsuda, Kennosuke Matsuoka
Jiro uses the name MC.M.B. (pronounced "Em-Cee Middle Brother"). He is 17 years old. His solo songs are "This Means War" (センセンフコク, Sensenfukoku), "School of IKB" and "Sunshine".
Saburo Yamada (山田 三郎, Yamada Saburō)
Voiced by: Kōhei Amasaki
Stage Actor: Ryuto Akishima/ Ryunosuke Nagashima, Yukia Takano
Saburo uses the name MC.L.B. (pronounced "Em-Cee Little Brother"). He is 14 years old and the youngest of the Yamada brothers, but is remarkably intelligent. His solo songs are "New Star", "Requiem" (レクイエム, Rekuiemu) and "Scarlet Summer" (朱夏, Shuka)

=== MAD TRIGGER CREW ===
MAD TRIGGER CREW is a rap team from Yokohama consisting of crime and military personnel. Their leader is Samatoki Aohitsugi, and their team songs are "Yokohama Walker", "Shinogi (Dead Pools)" (シノギ (Dead Pools), Shinogi (Dead Pools)), "HUNTING CHARM" and "Scarface". Their official color is blue.

Samatoki Aohitsugi (碧棺 左馬刻, Aohitsugi Samatoki)
Voiced by: Shintarō Asanuma
Stage Actor: Aran Abe, Takuya Uehara
Samatoki uses the name Mr.Hc. (pronounced "Mister Hardcore"). He is 25 years old and a high-ranking member of the Katen Family (火貂組, Katengumi), a yakuza clan. He is the leader of Mad Trigger Crew and used to be a member of The Dirty Dawg. as well as Mad Comic Dialogue. He has a younger sister named Nemu, who bears the same surname. His solo songs are "G Anthem of Y-City", "Gangsta's Paradise", "Rinka" (燐火, Rinka), and "Backbone",
Jyuto Iruma (入間 銃兎, Iruma Jūto)
Voiced by: Wataru Komada
Stage Actor: Kenta Mizue, YUKI
Jyuto uses the name 45 Rabbit. He is 29 years old and a corrupt police officer. His solo songs are "Bayside Smoking Blues" (ベイサイド・スモーキング・ブルース, Beisaido Sumōkingu Burūsu), "Uncrushable", and "Awake".
Rio Mason Busujima (毒島 メイソン 理鶯, Busujima Meison Riō)
Voiced by: Shinichiro Kamio
Stage Actor: Yūki Byrnes, Takumi Masunaga
Rio uses the name Crazy M. He is 28 years old and half-American from his father's side. He is a former military officer. His solo songs are "What's My Name?", "2DIE4", "Move Your Body Till You Die!" (with HOMIES) and "NO WAR".

=== Fling Posse ===
Fling Posse is a rap team from Shibuya, consisting of people from the art and entertainment industry. Their leader is Ramuda Amemura, and their team songs are "Shibuya Marble Texture (PCCS)", "Stella", "Black Journey", "Bonds from Scars" (キズアトがキズナとなる; Kizuato ga Kizuna to Naru) and "Anyways, Get on the Floor" (とりま Get on the Floor, Torima Get on the Floor). Fling Posse was the winner of the Second Division Rap Battle in 2021. Their official color is yellow.

Ramuda Amemura (飴村 乱数, Amemura Ramuda)
Voiced by: Yusuke Shirai
Stage Actor: Ryo Sekoguchi/ Kentaro Yasui, Junpei Mitsui
Ramuda uses the name easy R. He is 24 years old. He is the leader of Fling Posse and used to be a member of The Dirty Dawg. He is a fashion designer. His solo songs are "drops", "Pink-Colored Love" (ピンク色の愛, Pinku Iro no Ai) and "One and Only".
Gentaro Yumeno (夢野 幻太郎, Yumeno Gentarō)
Voiced by: Soma Saito
Stage Actor: Takahisa Maeyama/ Ryuichirō Sakata, Shunto Imai
Gentaro uses the name Phantom. He is 24 years old and an author. His solo songs are "Scenario Liar" (シナリオライアー, Shinario Raia), "Calyx" (蕚, Utena), "Beyond the Dreams" (夢の彼方, Yume No Kanata), and "Lie" (うそ, Uso)
Dice Arisugawa (有栖川 帝統, Arisugawa Daisu)
Voiced by: Yukihiro Nozuyama
Stage Actor: Ryo Takizawa, Taiyu Kitsuya
Dice uses the name Dead or Alive. He is 20 years old and a gambler. His solo songs are "3$EVEN", "SCRAMBLE GAMBLE", and "God in the Dice".

=== Matenrō ===
Matenro (麻天狼, Matenrō) is a rap team from Shinjuku consisting of medical and office personnel. Their leader is Jakurai Jinguji, and their team songs are "Shinjuku Style (Don't Make Us Laugh)" (Shinjuku Style～笑わすな～, Shinjuku Style ~Warawasuna~), "The Champion", "Papillon" (パピヨン, Papiyon), "TOMOSHIBI" and "Synchro City" (シンクロ・シティ, Shinkuro Shiti) Their official color is gray. Matenro was the winner of the First Division Rap Battle, in 2018.

Jakurai Jinguji (神宮寺 寂雷, Jingūji Jakurai)
Voiced by: Show Hayami
Stage Actor: Taiyo Ayukawa, Allen Kohatsu
Jakurai uses the name ill-DOC. He is 35 years old. He is the leader of Matenro and used to be a member of The Dirty Dawg. He is a doctor. His solo songs are "Labyrinth Walls" (迷宮壁, Meikyū Heki), "You Are, Therefore I Am" (君あり故に我あり, Kimi Ari Yue ni Ga Ari) and "Pomp and Gallantry" (威風颯爽, Ifuu Sassou).
Hifumi Izanami (伊弉冉 一二三, Izanami Hifumi)
Voiced by: Ryuichi Kijima
Stage Actor: Hirofumi Araki, Yūto Ando
Hifumi uses the name GIGOLO. He is 29 years old. He is a host. His solo songs are "Champagne Gold" (シャンパンゴールド, Shanpan Gōrudo), "Don't Stop the Party" (パーティーを止めないで, Party o Tomenaide), "Positive my Life" (ポジティブmy life, Pojitibu my life) and "The Last Song of the Beginning" (始まりのラストソング, Hajimari no Rasuto Songu).
Doppo Kannonzaka (観音坂 独歩, Kannonzaka Doppo)
Voiced by: Kent Itō
Stage Actor: Kodai Miyagi, Yūki Nakashita
Doppo uses the name DOPPO (in romaji). He is 29 years old. He is an office worker. He has a pessimistic attitude. His solo songs are "Tigridia" (チグリジア, Chiguridia), "Black or White" and "Andante".

== Other regions ==
=== Dotsuitare Hompo ===
Dotsuitare Hompo (どついたれ本舗) is a rap team from Osaka, introduced in September 2019 along with Bad Ass Temple. Their leader is Sasara Nurude. Their team songs are "Ah Osaka Dreamin' Night" (あゝオオサカdreamin'night, Ā Ōsaka Dreamin' Night) and "Laughin' Ōsaka!~What a Osaka!" (笑オオサカ!~What a OSAKA!, Wara Ōsaka!~What a Osaka!) and "縁 -ENISHI-" Their official color is orange.

Sasara Nurude (白膠木 簓, Nurude Sasara)
Voiced by: Ryota Iwasaki
Stage Actor: Yoshihiko Aramaki, Ryusei Kitade
Sasara uses the name Tragic Comedy. He is 26 years old and a stand-up comedian. He used to be in a group with Samatoki, known as "Mad Comic Dialogue." His solo songs are "Tragic Transistor", "Comedian Rhapsody" (コメディアン・ラプソディ, Komedian Rapusodi), and "Laughin' Hope".
Rosho Tsutsujimori (躑躅森 盧笙, Tsutsujimori Roshō)
Voiced by: Kengo Kawanishi
Stage Actor: Masamichi Satonaka, Torayoshi Iida
Rosho uses the name WISDOM. He is 26 years old and a teacher. His solo songs are "Own Stage", "Under Sail" and "On My Way".
Rei Amayado (天谷奴 零, Amayado Rei)
Voiced by: Takaya Kuroda
Stage Actor: Yoshihisa Higashiyama/ Naoya Gōmoto, Taishi Yoshikawa
Rei uses the name MC MasterMind. He is 46 years old and a conman. His solo songs are "FACES", "Count the money" and "The World is Yours".

=== Bad Ass Temple ===
Bad Ass Temple is a rap team from Nagoya, introduced in September 2019 along with Dotsuitare Hompo. Their leader is Kuko Harai. Their team songs are "Bad Ass Temple Funky Sounds" and "Enlightenment" (開眼, Kaigen) and "Hella Awesome Banquet" (でらすげぇ宴, Dera Sugee Utage). Their official color is purple.

Kuko Harai (波羅夷 空候, Harai Kūkō)
Voiced by: Shota Hayama
Stage Actor: Ryota Hirono, Tomoya Nakanishi
Kuko uses the name Evil Monk. He is 19 years old and a monk. He used to be in a group with Ichiro, known as "Naughty Busters." His solo songs are "Sōgyaran Bam" (そうぎゃらん BAM), "Young Gun of The Sun" and "Terminus" (終端, Shūtan)
Jyushi Aimono (四十物 十四, Aimono Jūshi)
Voiced by: Yuki Sakakihara
Stage Actor: Daigo Kato, Fūta Sakayori
Jyushi uses the name 14th Moon. He is 18 years old and the vocalist for a visual kei band. His solo songs are "Moonlight Shadow" (月光陰 -Moonlight Shadow-, Gekko In -Moonlight Shadow-), "Violet Masquerade", "Devil's Flower" (悪魔の花, Akuma no Hana)(performed with ArgoξOrchestra, his band), and "Continued".
Hitoya Amaguni (天国 獄, Amaguni Hitoya)
Voiced by: Eiji Takeuchi
Stage Actor: Ruito Aoyagi, Kōhei Nakatsuka
Hitoya uses the name Heaven and Hell. He is 35 years old and a lawyer. His solo songs are "One and Two, and Law", "If I Follow My Heart" and "Heartache".
