= 4, 3, 2, 1 =

4, 3, 2, 1 or 4321 may refer to:

== Film ==
- 4.3.2.1., 2010 film by Noel Clarke
- ...4 ..3 ..2 ..1 ...Morte, a 1967 Italian science fiction film

== Music ==
- "4, 3, 2, 1" (k-os song), song by k-os
- "4, 3, 2, 1" (LL Cool J song), song by LL Cool J
- "4-3-2-1", song by Raffi Boghosyan

== Other uses ==
- 4 3 2 1 (novel), 2017 novel by Paul Auster
- 4–3–2–1, a common formation in association football

== See also ==
- 1234 (disambiguation)
- "5-4-3-2-1", a 1963 single by Manfred Mann
- 54321 (film), a 2016 Tamil thriller film
- Countdown, a sequence of backward counting to indicate the time remaining before an event is scheduled to occur
