= 321 (film) =

- Directed by: Shanti Kumar Chilumula
- Written by: Shanti Kumar Chilumula
- Produced by: Ramanuja Reddy; Shanti Kumar Chilumula
- Starring: Mohit Pedada; Lavanya Sahukara; Vivan Surya; Lakshmi Vennela
- Cinematography: Siva Muppala
- Edited by: Siva Sarvani
- Music by: Calvin Joy
- Production company: Brahma Art Creations
- Release date: 23 October 2026
- Country: India
- Language: Telugu

321 is an Indian Telugu-language romantic drama film that is directed by Shanti Kumar Chilumula. The film is produced by Ramanuja Reddy and Shanti Kumar Chilumula under the banner Brahma Art Creations. The film stars Mohit Pedada and Lavanya Sahukara in lead roles.

Calvin Joy composed the music for the film. Siva Prasad Muppala handled the cinematography. Siva Sarvani edited the film.

== Plot ==
Abhi believes that only a love marriage can be a happy marriage. Shruthi believes that marrying her elders' choice is preferable, having observed the difficulties her parents experienced after having a love marriage. Abhi and Shruthi work in the same office.

Abhi immediately falls in love with Shruthi. When Abhi helps Shruthi's friend who is in trouble, Shruthi likes Abhi but because of previous negative experiences, does not express her feelings to Abhi.

Meanwhile, Abhi's father tries to have Abhi have an arranged marriage. Radha, a girl whom Abhi earlier met during a match-making ceremony returns to his life. Meanwhile, Abhi receives mysterious phone calls from an unknown young woman, Laya. Laya's identity, the fate of Abhi and Shruthi's love, and whom Abhi chooses to marry are then revealed.

== Cast ==
- Mohit Pedada as Abhi
- Lavanya Sahukara as Shruthi
- Vivan Surya
- Laksmi Vennela
- Yamini
- Srinivas Bhogireddy

== Music ==
Calvin Joy composed the music for the film.

Track Listing
| No. | Title | Lyrics | Singer(s) | Length |
|---|---|---|---|---|
| 1. | "Nanu Takina" | Shanti Kumar Chilumula | Sai Charan, Harini | 4:04 |
| 2. | "Yeda Thadipina" | Mounasri Mallik | Harshavardhan | 2:57 |
| Total length: | | | | 7:01 |

== Production ==
On 27 September 2026 the movie team released the 'Nannu Thakina' song. On 12 October 2026 the trailer of the film is released.

On 23 October 2026 the film was released in theaters.

== Reception ==
Bhanuprasad Rangaiahgari of News18 gave the film 2.75/5 rating and stated, "Mohit Pedada impressed with his natural acting as Abhi. Lavanya carried herself well in the role of Shruthi. The songs composed by Calvin Joy and the bgm suited the story well."

Chetupalli Sanjiv Kumar of Hindustantimes gave the movie 2.5/5 rating and stated, "The movie is made with a meaningful philosophy of three knots, two hearts, and one life of togetherness. Although the scenes in the first half have dragged a bit, the family sentiment and the thrilling suspense that come later in the movie will keep the audience in their seats."

Bhargav Chaganti of Ntvtelugu gave the movie 2.5/5 rating and stated, "Director Shanti Kumar avoided unnecessary mass scenes and double meaning dialogues, and showed us a clean story filled with family emotions. Despite a few hiccups, this film can be watched peacefully along with family members."
