= Tress 90 =

Norwegian software project

TRESS 90 (1990–1996) was a Norwegian software project meant to be the replacement for INFOTRYGD, a case-worker support system, used by the Norwegian National Insurance Service.

Due to administrative, political, organizational and technical problems, including extreme cost overruns, the project was eventually abandoned with a total pricetag of 1,2 billion kr ($200m).

It is still the largest IT failure in Norwegian history.

== Sources ==
- June 1995 Government report on TRESS-90 (in Norwegian)
