= 1-2-3-4 (book) =

Photography book by Anton Corbijn

- First edition (publ. Prestel Publishing)
- Author: Anton Corbijn
- Language: English
- Genre: Photography book
- Published: 2015
- Publisher: Prestel Publishing
- Publication place: Germany
- Pages: 352

1-2-3-4 is a photography book published by Dutch photographer Anton Corbijn in 2015. The book has a foreword by the artist himself. The book of music photography documents his vast career as a photographer of some of the leading contemporary musicians and rock bands, since the late 1970s, in a selection of 350 photographs, including many never published before.

== Artists and bands documented ==
The bands and musicians documented include Depeche Mode, U2, the Rolling Stones, Metallica, Nirvana, Arcade Fire, Joe Cocker, Johnny Rotten, Nick Cave, and Tom Waits.

Many of the musicians also wrote their contributions to document their work with Anton Corbijn.

== Content ==
The book theme was also the subject of the exhibition "Anton Corbijn 1-2-3-4", that took place at the Fotomuseum Den Haag in 2015.

The oversized book pays tribute to Corbijn's longtime work related with rock and roll singers and bands. Looking back over four decades, it features hundreds of images that Corbijn was able to capture largely as a result of his close relationships with his subjects. It also includes previously unpublished photos of Joe Cocker and the band Depeche Mode.
