= 123 BC =

123 BC in various calendars
- Gregorian calendar: 123 BC; CXXIII BC
- Ab urbe condita: 631
- Ancient Egypt era: XXXIII dynasty, 201
- Pharaoh: Ptolemy VIII Physcon, 23
- Ancient Greek Olympiad (summer): 164th Olympiad, year 2
- Assyrian calendar: 4628
- Balinese saka calendar: N/A
- Bengali calendar: −716 – −715
- Berber calendar: 828
- Buddhist calendar: 422
- Burmese calendar: −760
- Byzantine calendar: 5386–5387
- Chinese calendar: 丁巳年 (Fire Snake); 2575 or 2368 — to — 戊午年 (Earth Horse); 2576 or 2369
- Coptic calendar: −406 – −405
- Discordian calendar: 1044
- Ethiopian calendar: −130 – −129
- Hebrew calendar: 3638–3639
- Hindu calendars
- Vikram Samvat: −66 – −65
- Shaka Samvat: N/A
- Kali Yuga: 2978–2979
- Holocene calendar: 9878
- Iranian calendar: 744 BP – 743 BP
- Islamic calendar: 767 BH – 766 BH
- Javanese calendar: N/A
- Julian calendar: N/A
- Korean calendar: 2211
- Minguo calendar: 2034 before ROC 民前2034年
- Nanakshahi calendar: −1590
- Seleucid era: 189/190 AG
- Thai solar calendar: 420–421
- Tibetan calendar: མེ་མོ་སྦྲུལ་ལོ་ (female Fire-Snake); 4 or −377 or −1149 — to — ས་ཕོ་རྟ་ལོ་ (male Earth-Horse); 5 or −376 or −1148

Year 123 BC was a year of the pre-Julian Roman calendar. At the time it was known as the Year of the Consulship of Balearicus and Flamininus (or, less frequently, year 631 Ab urbe condita) and the Sixth Year of Yuanshuo. The denomination 123 BC for this year has been used since the early medieval period, when the Anno Domini calendar era became the prevalent method in Europe for naming years.

== Events ==
=== By place ===
==== Roman Republic ====
- Gaius Gracchus elected Roman tribune for the first time. He waits until after his re-election the following year before pushing forward the various civil and agrarian reforms that his brother championed in 133 BC.
- Aix-en-Provence founded under the name of Aquae Sextiae by the Roman consul Sextius Calvinus.
- Quintus Caecilius Metellus conquers the Balearic Islands for Rome, for which he earns the agnomen "Balearicus." He settles 3,000 Roman and Iberian colonists on the islands and founds the cities of Palma and Pollentia.

==== China ====
- Spring: The Han General-in-Chief Wei Qing launches two invasions of Xiongnu territory from Dingxiang, defeating two Xiongnu armies and killing or capturing several thousand of the enemy.

- During the second expedition, the force under Su Jian and Zhao Xin is surrounded and almost entirely destroyed by the army of Yizhixie Chanyu. Zhao Xin defects to the Chanyu.
- For these two campaigns, Emperor Wu of Han orders Wei Qing to make his eighteen-year-old nephew Huo Qubing the commander of a force of 800 cavalry. Raiding deep into enemy territory, Huo's force kills or captures a Xiongnu Prime Minister and a Household Administrator, kills the Marquis of Jiruo (an elder relative of Yizhixie Chanyu), and captures the Chanyu's uncle Luogubi.

- A conspiracy led by Liu An, king of Huainan, is discovered. Liu An commits suicide, and his queen and crown prince are executed. Huainan becomes Jiujiang Prefecture.

== Deaths ==
- Alexander II Zabinas, king of the Seleucid Empire
