= My Week with Marilyn (soundtrack) =

2011 film score by Conrad Pope

My Week with Marilyn: Music from the Motion Picture

Film score by Conrad Pope; main theme by Alexandre Desplat
- Released: 8 November 2011
- Recorded: 2011
- Studio: Abbey Road Studios
- Genre: Film score
- Length: 58:40
- Label: Sony Classical
- Producer: Richard Glasser

Conrad Pope chronology
Grow Up Already (2010)	My Week with Marilyn (2011)	Tim's Vermeer (2013)

My Week with Marilyn: Music from the Motion Picture is the soundtrack to the 2011 drama film My Week with Marilyn released on 8 November 2011 by Sony Classical Records. The album mostly featured the cues from the original score composed by Conrad Pope, except for "Marilyn's Theme" by Alexandre Desplat. Desplat co-wrote most of the themes with Pope, while also featured excerpts from the music of 1950s and 1960s, few of them being digitally re-mastered for the film. Chinese pianist Lang Lang performed few tracks along with Williams who sang "I Found a Dream", "That Old Black Magic" and a medley of "When Love Goes Wrong, Nothing Goes Right" and "Heat Wave".

== Background ==
Alexandre Desplat wrote the main theme for the film, "Marilyn's Theme", for the producer Harvey Weinstein, and thereafter Desplat asked Pope to adapt the theme as well as composing the remaining score for the film, though he would share the writing credits. He wanted to convey and contrast the music of the 1950's Hollywood as well as depicting the innocence of Marilyn Monroe. On the other side, the film also featured an exotic music, which includes music for big band, exotica, and very English music for Colin Clark.

The first concept for the score was to have a piano with few big band moments taking an almost Summer of '42 approach. Following Weinstein's call, he wanted to do a "more sweeping, cinematic approach". To replicate the old school period, he asked sound engineer Pete Cobbin to use microphones from 1948 in recording several cues. He intended to duplicate the harmonic feel of the period, while some of the source music and vocals might considered emblematic of the golden era. On reflecting the 1950s jazz music, Pope needed to "convey the energy, sense of newness and possibility that Clark feels in the film, and whole big band vibe seemed to fit the visuals as well as the story". While Michelle Williams performed "I Found a Dream", the underscore blends with orchestral accompaniment of the song keeping with the 1950s tight voicing of the strings. Another challenge the team faced is that they had to match Williams's performance that was recorded separately as a solo performance.

The score was recorded at the Abbey Road Studios in London, with Pope conducting the orchestra, and pianist Lang Lang playing the main theme.

== Track listing ==
No.	Title	Writer(s)	Performer(s)	Length
1.	"Marilyn's Theme"	Desplat	Lang Lang	1:48
2.	"'When Love Goes Wrong, Nothin' Goes Right' & 'Heat Wave'"	Harold Adamson; Hoagy Carmichael; Irving Berlin	Michelle Williams	2:10
3.	"Colin Runs Off to the Circus"	Pope; Desplat		3:02
4.	"Colin Joins the Circus/Mr. Jacobs"	Pope; Desplat		2:06
5.	"Driving Through Pinewood"	Pope; Desplat	Lang	0:48
6.	"Paparazzi"	Pope; Desplat	Lang	2:55
7.	"Colin and Vivian"	Pope; Desplat		1:28
8.	"Memories Are Made of This" (2000 digital remaster)	Frank Miller; Richard Dehr; Terry Gilkyson	Martin	2:19
9.	"Rushes"	Pope; Desplat		1:28
10.	"Lucy"	Pope; Desplat		0:47
11.	"Uno, Dos, Tres"	Indart; Alvarez	Tropicana Orchestra	2:46
12.	"Arthur and Marilyn"	Pope; Desplat		2:12
13.	"Marilyn Alone"	Pope; Desplat	Lang	1:41
14.	"Arthur's Notebook"	Pope; Desplat		2:17
15.	"Vivian Screens Marilyn"	Pope; Desplat		1:38
16.	"The Getaway"	Pope; Desplat		1:46
17.	"You Stepped Out of a Dream"	Gus Kahn	Nat King Cole	2:39
18.	"Eton Schoolyard"	Pope; Desplat		1:20
19.	"Autumn Leaves" (2005 remastered)	Johnny Mercer	Cole	2:44
20.	"Overdose"	Pope; Desplat		3:31
21.	"Colin's Heartbreak"	Pope; Desplat		1:49
22.	"Colin and Marilyn"	Pope; Desplat		3:08
23.	"It's a Wrap, I Found a Dream"	Pope; Christopher Hassall	Williams; Lang	2:38
24.	"Such Stuff That Dreams Are Made Of"	Pope; Desplat		3:37
25.	"Remembering Marilyn"	Pope; Desplat	Lang	3:19
26.	"That Old Black Magic"	Mercer	Williams	2:44
Total length:				58:40

== Reception ==
Rodrigo Perez of The Playlist wrote "Musically, 'Marilyn' is problematic as well to the point of distraction. While Alexandre Desplat does provide the lovely theme, Conrad Pope takes the composing center stage, mostly filling the drama with "isn't this all so delightful?" musical cues. Of course there's also, "isn't this sad?" and "isn't this a dreadfully serious pickle we've gotten ourselves into?" but none of these motifs do the film any favors."

== Personnel ==
Credits adapted from AllMusic.

Album credits

- Conrad Pope – arranger, composer, conductor, orchestration, primary artist, score producer
- Alexandre Desplat – composer (main theme)
- David Krane – arranger, producer, vocal coach
- Richard Glasser – soundtrack producer
- Olga Fitzroy – vocal recording
- Peter Cobbin – engineer
- Nick Taylor – engineer, mixing
- John Barrett – assistant engineer
- Adam Miller – assistant engineer
- Paul Pritchard – assistant engineer
- Tom Bullen – mixing assistant
- Andrew Walter – mastering
- Peter Clarke – music editor
- Jay Duerr – music editor
- Andy Glen – music editor
- Terry Davies – vocal coach
- Isobel Griffiths – music contractor
- Charlotte Matthews – assistant contractor
- David Hage – music preparation
- Shaun Mills – design
- Alison Wright – score supervisor
- Maggie Rodford – music supervisor
- Dana Sano – music supervisor
- Helen Yates – assistant music supervisor
- Thomas Bowes – orchestra leader
- Bill Newlin – orchestration
- Jon Charles – orchestration
- Nan Schwartz – orchestration
- Clifford Jay Tasner – orchestration

Performer credits

- Lang Lang – piano
- Dave Arch – piano
- John Barclay – trumpet
- Mark Nightingale – trombone
- Chris Baron – percussion
- Dave Bishop – sax (tenor)
- Nicholas Bucknall – clarinet
- Jamie Talbot – clarinet
- Karen Jones – flute
- Gary Kettel – percussion
- Michelle Williams – vocals
- La Tropicana Orchestra – orchestra
