= Rodolfo Ayoroa =

Rodolfo "Rudy" Ayoroa (September 16, 1927 – October 31, 2003) was a Bolivian painter and a sculptor.

== Background ==
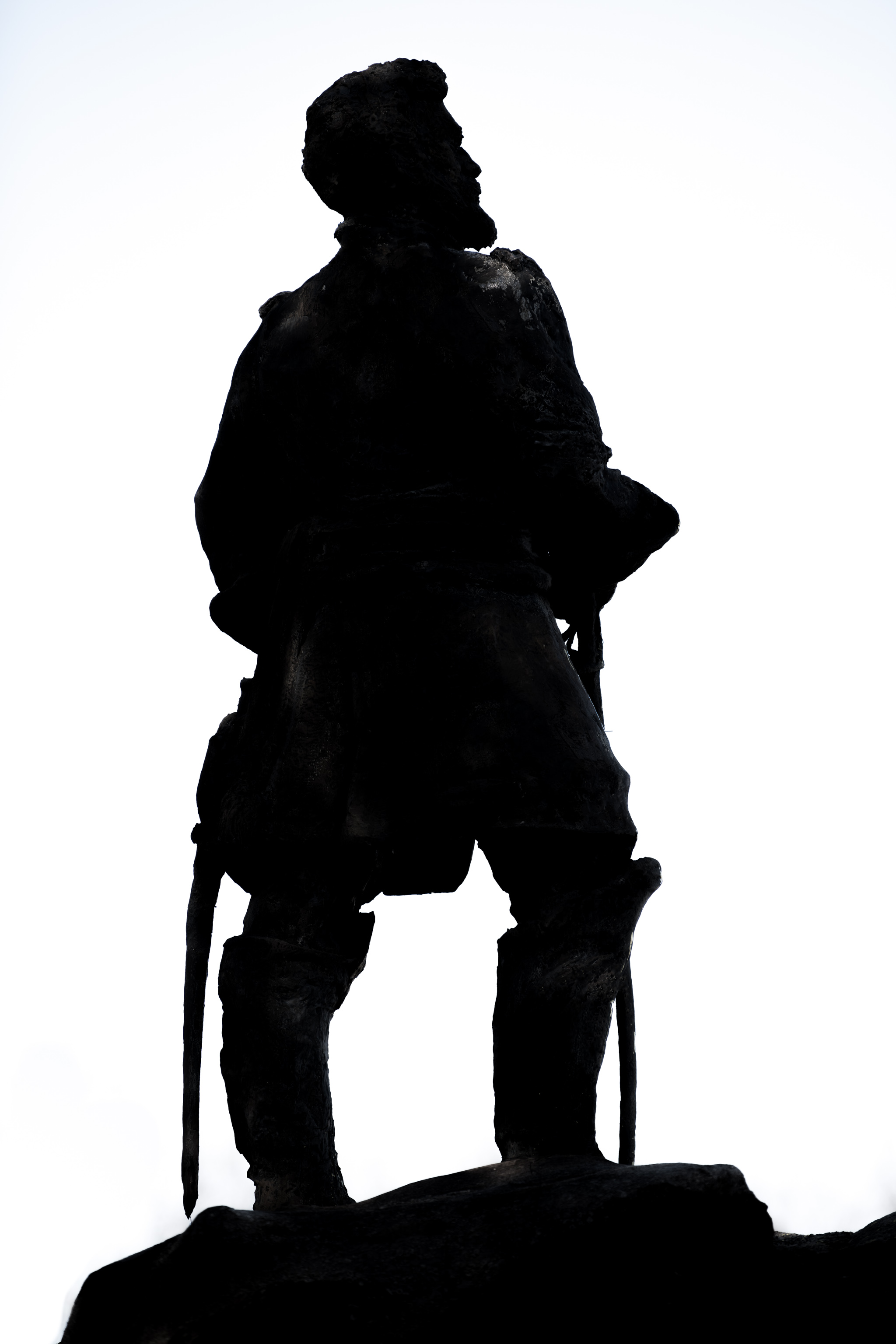
A silhouette of U.S. Army (Union) General George H. Thomas' life-size statue by sculptor Rodolfo Ayoroa, located at Civil War Park, Lebanon, Kentucky

Ayoroa (also known as Rudy Ayoroa, Rodolfo E. Ayoroa, Rudy Aroyoa, Rudy Ayora) was born in La Paz, Bolivia, on September 16, 1927. His parents were Esther Soria-Galvarro of LaPaz, Bolivia, and the late Gen. Robert Ayoroa. He was educated at the University of Buenos Aires in Buenos Aires, Argentina. In 1964, he moved to Washington, DC and was a visiting professor at American University. In the mid-1980s he moved to Danville, Kentucky, with his wife, Jane, who was born there.

== Art ==
Ayoroa was at the forefront of the kinetic art movement in the mid-1950s. His paintings are filled with geometric elements and contrasts of warm and blue colors. His sculptures are made with Plexiglass bent into geometric shapes to look like perpetual motion. Ayoroa's art hangs in the Hirshhorn Museum and Sculpture Garden; the Library of Congress; National Museum of American Art; Smithsonian Institution; Museum of Modern Art of Latin America at the Organization of American States, Museum of Modern Art in Bogota, Colombia and National Museum of Fine Arts in La Paz, Bolivia. During his time in Danville, he developed an interest in painting Civil War battle scenes and did many pictures of the Battle of Perryville. He was commissioned by Lebanon to sculpt Confederate Major General John Hunt Morgan in 1999. However, the statue of the Confederate general, who raided and destroyed parts of the town, was never publicly displayed there. In 2015 the township put the statue out to bid. In 1999 Ayoroa created the life-size sculpture of U.S. Army Major General George Henry Thomas, which was unveiled in Civil War Park, Lebanon, Kentucky, where it stands today.

== Solo exhibitions ==
- 2003 Greater Loveland Historical Museum, Loveland, Ohio
- 2001 Museum of the Civil War, Bardstown, KY
- 1997 Chaing Kai-Shek Memorial Center, Tai Pei, Taiwan
- 1996 Teledyne Corporation, Lebanon, Kentucky
- 1994 Taipinquiri Gallery and Art Center, La Paz, Bolivia
- 1994 EMUSA Gallery, La Paz, Bolivia
- 1993 EMUSA Gallery, La Paz, Bolivia
- 1991 Inter-American Development Bank, Washington, D.C.
- 1990 EMUSA Gallery, La Paz, Bolivia
- 1989 Headley-Whitney Museum, Lexington, Kentucky
- 1988 Inter-American Development Bank, Washington, D.C.
- 1982–83 Multiple Galleries in La Paz, Santa Cruz and Cochabamba, Bolivia
- 1981 San Diego Gallery, Bogota, Colombia
- 1980 Norton Center for the Arts, Centre College, Danville, Kentucky
- EMUSA Gallery, La Paz, Bolivia
- Inter-American Development Bank, Washington, D.C.
- 1979 Gallery Uno, Dos, Tres, San Salvador, El Salvador
- El Camino Real Gallery, Boca Raton, Florida
- Fayetteville Museum of Art, North Carolina
- 1977 Genesis Gallery, New York City
- Museum of Contemporary Art, Bogota, Colombia
- EMUSA Gallery, La Paz, Bolivia
- Lorenz Gallery, Bethesda, Maryland
- National Museum of Fine Art, La Paz, Bolivia
- 1976 Washington World Gallery, Washington, D.C.
- Huber Gallery, Washington, D.C.
- National Library, San Jose, Costa Rica
- 1974 Franz Bader Gallery, Washington, D.C.
- National Academy of Sciences, Washington, D.C.
- 1969 Group Gallery, Jacksonville, Florida
- 1968 Casa del Arte, San Juan, Puerto Rico
- Pan American Union (OAS), Washington, D.C.
- 1967 Asociación Estimulo de Bellas Artes, Buenos Aires, Argentina (Ayoroa, Bóto, Vardánega)
- 1956 San Andres University, La Paz, Bolivia
- Bolivian-German Cultural Institute, La Paz, Bolivia

== Academic appointments ==
- 1981–82 Visiting Professor of Art, San Francisco Xavier University, Sucre, Bolivia
- 1974–75 Visiting Professor of Art, American University, Washington, D.C.

== Critiques ==
Art critic Marta Traba, who founded the Museum of Modern Art in Bogotá, said that Ayoroa was "one of the truly great artists of his generation coming from Latin America."

== Death ==
He died in Danville, Kentucky in on October 31, 2003. He is survived by Roberto, Leonardo and Rodolfo Ayoroa Jr., all of Potomac, Md., and Joshua Ayoroa of Danville; two daughters, Sandra Alvarado of Silver Springs, Md., and Gabriela Ayoroa of Germantown, Md.; two brothers, Jose Ayoroa of Potomac and Gaston Ayoroa of Germantown; a sister, Nazira Simon of Potomac; and four grandchildren.
