= IQ (rapper) =

Russian rapper (born 1987)

IQ Oleg Verov
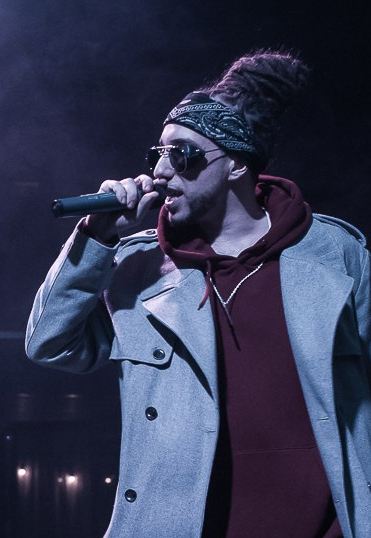

Background information
- Also known as: AIKU (formerly IQ)
- Born: 23 June 1987 (age 39); Moscow, Russia
- Genres: Hip-Hop, Reggae
- Occupation: Rapper
- Label: Lev Pravo Zvuk (2004 - 2009) Istoria Music (2017 - 2020)
- Website: https://vk.com/iqofficial

Oleg Verov (Russian: Олег Веров, romanized: Oleg Vyerov), better known by his stage name AIKU (formerly IQ), is a Russian rapper. He is known for his fusion of reggae and rap.

== Career ==
Oleg was born in Moscow in the Otradnoye district. He began rapping in the late 1990s, recording his first track in 1998. In 2001, together with Leo Dee, he founded the White Shadows group. The musicians made all the recordings on their own, distributed them on cassettes and disks. In 2003, the album "White Shadows" was released, but later the team broke up.

In 2010, IQ began working on his solo album O-Street. As conceived by the rapper, it had to be “only classic pumping hip-hop." Soon the first video clips for the singles from the album appeared: "O-Street", "Consciousness" and "Secret". In 2011-12, the artist appeared at various concerts: at the MIR festival, in Moscow clubs Izvestia Hall and Sixteen Tons, in Hamburg at the Hip Hop Academy.

As a result, "O-Street" was released on 28 May 2013. It included 19 tracks, the work on the album lasted for 3 years. The disc is designed as a color 10-page comic by Cap Art. In support, clips were shot: "School" and "Outro". Among the guests on the plastic were Fuze, Marat, Panda, Check, BMB, Vitek, Korob and former bandmate Leo Dee. IQ expressed dismay due to the low public recognition the album received, arguing it was because of the album's classical sound.

In 2015, IQ became a participant in the television rap competition Beats & Vibes.

In 2017, AIKU began to collaborate with the label "Istoria Music", which was founded in 2016 by rapper ST.

In 2019, he participated in the documentary film about the Russian hip-hop community, "BEEF," directed by Russian rapper Roma Zhigan. He appeared alongside other rappers like Jacques Anthony, Husky, and Oxxxymiron.

Oleg visited with solo performances in various cities - St. Petersburg, Chelyabinsk, Kazan, Tarkhankut, Sevastopol, Almaty. In 2017, he performed at the "Snow Party" in the Olympic Sports Complex with ST. In 2018, he performed at the FIFA Fan Fest in Moscow and Sochi, a hugely popular event.

== Discography ==
=== White Shadows ===
- 2003 - White shadows

=== Studio albums ===
- 2013 - O-STREET
- 2016 - Four Sides EP
- 2017 - Antagonist
- 2021 - Another EP

=== Collaborative albums ===
- 2009 - Levpravhop (together with the artists of the LevPravZvuk label)
- 2009 - The Most Magical Flow (with YG)

=== Singles ===
- 2011 - O Street
- 2011 - Secret
- 2013 - Impact (with Sadat X, Leo Dee)
- 2016 - Silk
- 2016 - Everest
- 2016 - Curtain (together with ST )
- 2017 - Magic Night
- 2017 - Grew up and Became a Rapper
- 2017 - Can't See Them (with ST, Nasled & Lars)
- 2017 - Your Name (with Nasled & Lars)
- 2022 - Uno Dos Tres (with Massimo)
- 2022 - Para Minute (with Racoona)
- 2023 - Fake Love [to be released]

== Filmography ==
- 2008 - "The Most Magical Flow"
- 2009 - Choose Yourself
- 2011 - "O-Street"
- 2011 - "Consciousness"
- 2011 - "Secret"
- 2013 - "School"
- 2013 - Outro
- 2013 - "Impact" ft. Sadat X (Brand Nubian), Leo Dee
- 2015 - "Centrifuge" ft. Check, Miko
- 2017 - Bullet
- 2017 - "Move on" ft. ST
- 2017 - "We do not see them" ft. ST, Nasled & Lars
- 2019 - "Drops" ft. Jay Mar
- 2019 - "On Emotions"
- 2020 - "Berries"
- 2020 - "Piranha"
