= 123456 =

123456 are the first 6 positive Arabic numerals. It can also refer to:

- 123,456 the natural number
- 123456, a common example of poor password strength
- "123456", a song by Fitz and the Tantrums from the album All the Feels
- Braille pattern dots-123456, a braille cell
- 123456, or 123 456, a typical example of specifying a six-digit vehicle license plate number, for instance, as with United States license plate designs and serial formats
