= Nirma Zárate =

Colombian artist and professor (1936–1999)

Nirma Zarate
- Born: 1936; Bogotá, Colombia
- Died: 1999 (aged 62–63); Bogotá, Colombia
- Occupations: artist professor

Nirma Zárate Mejía (1936–1999) was a Colombian artist, professor, and researcher famously known for her abstract works. Zárate was born in Bogotá, Colombia.

She grew up in Colombia during World War II. Zárate experimented with different mediums and styles, such as Abstract Art or Pop Art. Her first exhibition was as a student in Bogotá and shortly after, she moved to the United States where she lived for four years. She settled in Washington where she was chosen by Union Panamericana De Washington to participate in an exhibition of great Colombian art. Later in her career, Zárate was one of the co-directors of Taller 4 Rojo, a collective of Colombian artists interested in representing the political and social reality of Colombia. Her art during this period in her life turned shifted to more politically active art.

She also taught at the Universidad Nacional de Colombia for many years. Zárate died in her hometown of Bogotá, in 1999, at the age of sixty-three.

== Education ==
Nirma studied art from the 1950s through the 1960s. She began her studies in art at the University of Los Andes in 1955. She went on to graduate from the School of Fine Arts at the National University of Colombia in 1960.

In 1969, he moved to London to study silkscreen at the Royal Academy of Arts in London thanks to a British Council Scholarship.

== Taller 4 Rojo ==
The Taller 4 Rojo, who believed in political expression and resistance through graphic arts and teaching, was originally founded by Zárate and her husband Diego Arango after studying graphic arts at the Royal Academy in London. Specifics on when and how the group was actually founded is a mystery as every artist has a different version, with some saying 1971 and others 1972. The group slowly grew and included other artists such as Carlos Granada and Jorge Mora. The group later gained momentum and grew to include other artists as members of the board, which included Zárate, Arango, Jorge Mora, Jorge Villegas, Germán Rojas, Umberto Giangrandi, Carlos Granada, and Fabio Rodriguez. The key to the group's growth and success at the time, especially in a hostile political environment, was that the artists themselves had an interdisciplinary approach in which they created the art, taught others how to create art, and were politically involved themselves. The group was a safe haven and place where everyone had a voice and these voices were expressed through prints on postcards, pamphlets, and publications for social movements. Classes were offered in order to teach community members how to print and become involved. The school, which they called Taller Escuela de Artes Gráficas 4 Rojo, opened on February 10, 1973. Courses were offered in both traditional and contemporary forms of graphic art, including photography, drawing, design, and newer forms of printmaking such as silk screening. Two courses were offered in graphic arts. The first was a beginners course and the second was an advanced course mostly for college art students but open to those with enough skill. Courses were offered at three different levels of competency and knowledge in the arts: beginning, intermediate, and advanced, the latter being reserved for graduates of art academies looking to advance their knowledge of printmaking. Taller 4 Rojo dissolved in 1974 due to political differences between members.

== Chronology ==
1936: Born in Bogotá.

1955: She began her painting studies at the Universidad de los Andes.

1958: In charge of the chair of drawing at the National Pedagogical Institute.

1960: She graduated from the School of Fine Arts of the National University of Colombia and made an individual exhibition at the National Library.

1961: Commissioned by the National University, makes a tour of cultural approach by the countries of South America.

1962: She makes a trip of studies to the United States and it is based in Washington.

1963: Second Painting Prize at the XV Salón de Artistas Colombianos.

1964: She obtained the second prize of Painting in the "Intercol" Salon of young artists and made an abstract painting exhibition in the Luis Ángel Arango Library of Bogotá (BLAA).

1967: She enters as a professor at the Universidad de los Andes.

1968: Make the exhibition Pinturas en la BLAA.

1969: She moved to London to study engraving at the Royal Academy of Arts in London.

1970: Returns to Colombia and establishes a Graphic Arts workshop with Diego Arango called Taller 4 Rojo.

1971: Participates in the Colombian Illustrators and Engravers Exhibition organized in the BLAA by Germán Rubiano Caballero and in the First American Biennial of Graphic Arts in Cali.

1972: Exhibits at the Second Latin American Engraving Biennial in San Juan.

1980: Make a mural about the strength of the union movement in Antioquia in Sintra Departamento, with the support of Alexis Forero, Teresa Quiñones and Felipe Larrea.

1983: Decides to start and study in New York.

1984: Participates in the exhibition Alquimia de papel, from the Galería Acosta Valencia in Bogotá.

1986: Handprints exhibition on handmade paper, Museum of Modern Art of Bogotá.

1988: Exhibition Paper and fibers, Museum of Art and Popular Traditions.

1989: Fibras Exhibition, Art Center in Medellín.

1990: Handmade Paper Exhibition, Colombian Fund for Scientific Research.

1992: Participates in Atmospheres Andinas, Bolivarian Museum, Quinta de San Pedro Alejandrino, Santa Marta.

1994: XXXV National Salon of Artists, Corferias.

1999: Dies in the city of Bogotá.

== Artwork ==
Óleo Número 4, 1964

Nirma Zárate

Painting, oil on canvas

122.5x152cm

The Banco de La República Art Collection

Gran Bloque de Piedra Onírica, 1967'

Nirma Zárate

Painting, oil on wood board

89x184cm

The Banco de La República Art Collection

¡Uno…dos…tres…fuera!, 1968

Nirma Zárate

Painting, acrylic and oil on canvas

Vuelta a Colombia... en bicicleta, 1968

Nirma Zárate

Painting, acrylic and oil on canvas

200x163cm

The Banco de La República Art Collection

Description- Four frames of equal size make up the acrylic painting Vuelta a Colombia ... by Nirma Zárate's bicycle. The artist located in the center of the modules the image, seen from behind, of the trunk, head, thighs and arms of a cyclist who holds the handlebar with his hands and wears his respective dress shirt and tight shorts.

Aggression to Vietnam, 1970

Nirma Zarate

Photography and engraving, screen prints - triptych

60x 50 cm

MAC

Description- This print via silkscreen depicts a woman through three stages of the war. All three stages have a dollar bill with different U.S. based companies and as the frames move on the dollar bill starts to burn up until it is nearly gone. The woman gets happier the more the dollar burns. This piece was done to protest the Vietnam war and depicts why the U.S. went to war in the first place, according to the artist.

8 intoxicados con hongos, 1971

Nirma Zárate

Photography, Screen print on paper

102x70.2cm

The Banco de La República Art Collection

A Nosotros, 1971

Nirma Zárate

Photography, screen print on paper

70x50cm

The Banco de La República Art Collection

Una niña muere por inanición, 1971

Nirma Zárate

Photography, screen print on paper

83.3x52.4cm

The Banco de La República Art Collection

A la huelga 100, a la huelga 1000, 1978

Nirma Zárate

Serigraphy

100x70cm

The Banco de La República Art Collection

El algodón 1 - Los iguazos, 1980

Nirma Zárate

Serigraphy

70x50cm

The Banco de La República Art Collection

Description- Depicts a field worker at the top holding a hoe and almost like a grin on his face, while a line of people walk with luggage below him.

== Exhibitions ==
- Organization of American States, Washington, DC (1968). "Nirma Zarate of Colombia: Oils".
- Biblioteca Luis Angel Arango, Bogota (1968). "Nirma Zarate".
- 1986 Huellas papel hecho a mano: Nirma Zárate, Museo de Arte Moderno de Bogota
- 1988 El papel y las fibras, Museo de Arte y Tradiciones Populares, Santafé de Bogotá
- 1989 Fibras, Centro de Arte, Medellin, Colombia
- 1992 Atmosferas andinas, Museo Bolivariano de Arte Contemporaneo, Santa Marta, Colombia

== Collections ==
One particularly strong political work, Aggression to Vietnam, by Zárate and Arango was added to the Google Arts Project, an online art archive of famous works, in collaboration with the Museum of Contemporary Art Bogota (MAC) in 2017 as part of a partnership to upload famous and highly sought after art works into an online library available to users all around the world.

== Accolades ==
- 1961: Grant to travel in South America
- 1963: Awarded second place in the painting category in the Colombian National Salon
- 1969-70: British Council scholarship to study silk screen in England
- 1983-84: Pratt Institute scholarship to study printmaking
