= TRE3S =

Studio album by Chikita Violenta
- Released: January 25, 2011
- Genre: Indie rock
- Label: Arts & Crafts
- Producer: Dave Newfeld

Chikita Violenta chronology
The Stars and Suns Sessions (2007)	TRE3S (2011)

Professional ratings
Review scores
Source	Rating
Spin	7/10 stars
InYourSpeakers	(65/100)
The Record (Bergen County)	4/4 stars

TRE3S is the third studio album by Chikita Violenta, released in early 2011, to a mix of mild and enthusiastic reviews. Spin magazine gave the album 7 out of 10 stars, stating "While the production's scope doesn't quite fit Chikita Violenta's knack for scrappy Superchunk-style guitar pop, the busy shimmer usually complements the songs' energy instead of burying it." Scott Fallon of the Bergen County Record gave it four out of four stars, calling it "the first great album of 2011," and, noting producer Newfeld's work with Broken Social Scene, wrote "Chikita Violenta has taken the whole lo-fi anthemic pop thing to heart."

== Track listing ==
1. "Roni"
2. "All I Need's a Little More"
3. "Tired"
4. "Holiday"
5. "The Pause"
6. "ATPG"
7. "The Monster (Was Last Seen Approaching the Power Plant)"
8. "Siren"
9. "España"
10. "Supercycle"
11. "My Connection"
