= Made in China (disambiguation) =

Made in China is the mark affixed to products manufactured in the People's Republic of China.

Made in China may also refer to:

- Made in China 2025, a national plan by the State Council of China

== Films ==
- Made in China (2009 film), an American comedy film
- Made in China (2014 film), a South Korean film directed by Dong-hoo Kim
- Made in China (2019 film), a Bollywood film directed by Mikhil Musale
- Made in China (2019 French film), a French film directed by Julien Abraham
- Made in China (2022 film), an Indian Kannada-language film
- Ittymaani: Made in China, an Indian Malayalam-language film
- Chandni Chowk to China, a 2009 Indian film originally titled Made in China

== Music ==
- Made in China (album), a 2005 album by Juliana Hatfield
- Made in China, alias of American record producer Dr. Luke

== See also ==
- Made in Taiwan, the mark affixed to products manufactured in the island of Taiwan controlled by the Republic of China
- Country of origin, marks affixed to products indicating the countries it was manufactured in
