= Made in China (2009 film) =

- Directed by: Judi Krant
- Written by: Judi Krant; Dan Sumpter
- Produced by: James Choi; Bronwyn Cornelius; Judi Krant; Monnie Wills
- Starring: Jackson Kuehn; Dan Sumpter; Syna Zhang; Deng Juan
- Cinematography: Petter Eldin
- Edited by: Victoria Mauch; Bart Rachmil; Dan Sumpter
- Music by: Matt Mariano
- Production company: Beachwood Pictures
- Distributed by: IFC Films
- Release date: March 15, 2009 (SXSW)
- Running time: 87 minutes
- Country: United States
- Language: English

Made in China is a 2009 comedy film co-written, directed, and produced by Judith “Judi” Krant. It is also produced by James Choi, Bronwyn Cornelius and co-written by Dan Sumpter. The film stars Jackson Kuehn, Dan Sumpter, Syna Zhang, and Deng Juan. It follows Johnson, an optimistic albeit naïve Texan, as he navigates through Shanghai's foreign streets to make his dream a reality. The title, Made in China, is a reference to the commonly found manufacturing label.

Developed as a micro-budget indie film, the crew set out to write a story based in China, excited to capture a location rarely seen in American independent film. The film initially struggled to find a production company that would sponsor resources due to legal concerns regarding the crew's plans to film without formal Chinese governmental permission. Beachwood Pictures subsequently joined to produce the film, with Monnie Wills acting as executive producer.

The film made its premiere at the 2009 SXSW Film Festival and would later have a limited circulation of film festivals and specific theatres. Critical reception for Made in China was generally positive, praising the film for its acting and cinematography though doubtful of its relevancy outside of the indie scene. Following its success at film festivals, where it entered for and won multiple award competitions, Made in China was picked up for distribution by IFC Films.

== Plot ==
The film focuses on a novelty inventor named "Johnson", a 20-something from Texas who has designed what he believes will be the next great novelty item - " a humorous domestic hygiene product". He makes contact with a Chinese manufacturer in Shanghai via Craigslist and decides to fly to China with his life savings to create his dream product. Upon arrival, his contact - the elusive James Choi, fails to show up or answer his phone. A fish out of water but optimistic and determined, Johnson decides to negotiate the manufacturing contract himself, without knowledge of Chinese. The film follows Johnson as he makes his journey through Shanghai to achieve his dreams, from nightclubs to market streets, after becoming involved with scam artists Magnus (Dan Sumpter) and Olive (Syna Zhang). Johnson explains, "every object has a story, and in that story is an inventor" and through his adventure, the history of iconic novelty inventors is revealed, including joy buzzer's Soren Sorensen Adams, pet rock's Gary Dahl, slinky's Richard T. James, and the ant farms' Milton Levine. The film's ending features a cameo of Matthew McConaughey, a fellow Texan and celebrity, using Johnson's new novelty product.

== Cast ==
- Jackson Kuehn as Johnson
- Syna Zhang as Olive
- Dan Sumpter as Magnus
- Deng Juan as Dorothy
- Bronwyn Cornelius as Audrey
- Charlotte Mikkelborg as the Interpreter
- Matthew McConaughey as himself

== Production ==
=== Development ===
The film started as an idea between James Choi and Judi Krant who sought out to make a micro-budget film together, with Choi acting as producer and Krant as director. Due to the film's cinematographer Peter Eldin's recommendation to shoot in China, where he believes it could be cheaply done, the film's co-writers (Judi Krant and Dan Sumpter) began to work on a China-centred script. During this time, Choi worked to cast Jackson Kuehn as the film's lead role and introduced him to Krant “with a note that said, “Meet Johnson”. Many of the production crew would also make cameos throughout film, with some like Sumpter and Browyn Cornelius, the film's respective writer and producer were also part of the cast.

As an indie production with limited resources, initial development on the film was slow and the crew struggled to find a production company. Since receiving formal permission to film in China can be challenging the original production team was intent on filming Shanghai's old neighborhoods without approval from the local Censorship Board. This resulted in one instance in which a London-based production company's offer had to be rejected because they deemed the crew's guerilla shooting style too risky and wanted to switch filming locations to Hong Kong instead. Krant insisted that Shanghai's cityscape was essential to providing production value since it was “inherently visually exciting” and has yet to be fully explored by the indie lens. As many of these old neighborhoods were or in the process of being demolished, Krant felt thrilled that some of them could be memorized in the film. It was after Monnie Wills, the film's subsequent executive producer, took an interest in the script and Beachwood Pictures became involved that filming was set in motion.

=== Filming & Post-production ===
As the film's development was running on a humble budget with no legal permits, the crew had no cultural or linguistic mediators present in China, director Krant and producer Cornelius opted to arrive two weeks earlier than the rest of the crew to familiarize themselves with Shanghai. Made in China was shot on location in East Texas and Shanghai over the course of around 20 days, at approximately 10 and 25 different locations respectively. Guerrilla-style shooting was risky so production was constantly ongoing, lead actor Jackson Kuehn recounted that he would often be up at 5 A.M. and would only return home by 1:30 A.M. Kuehn also recalled vomiting in a train station after days of suffering from lack of sleep and China's hot-humid weather, which reached upwards to 100 degrees Fahrenheit by day and had heavy pouring rain by night. Posing as an Italian Documentary Crew, the Made in China production crew each came from different backgrounds but all shared the purpose of proving an "unbending indie principles and strong diet of independent filmmaking." After the 15 days long shoot in Shanghai finished, Kuehn remembered feeling out of place upon his return to Los Angeles and longed for China; that was until one of the producers contacted him for a reshoot.

The entirety of the film was shot using a Panasonic AG-HVX200 P2 HD handheld camcorder, which Krant and Eldin researched and chose as a budget-friendly camera that was capable of shooting in HD quality and 24 fps. Krant said: "You always want the best image acquisition you can afford and, working on a micro-budget, we were delighted by the picture quality we achieved with the HVX200". The HVX200 was also chosen because it allowed the crew to be nimble and efficient whilst navigating Shanghai's busy streets and shooting under the radar in mainland China. The film was shot in High Definition at 720p, 24 frames per second, with natural lighting being utilised in the majority of the sets and was edited in Final Cut Pro by Sumpter, Victoria Mauch, Bart Rachmil. Made in China's music was composed by Matt Mariano, who performed and recorded the soundtrack in MM Music Inc studio using a variety of instruments and objects, including a toy guitar, slinkys and squeaky toys amongst other things.

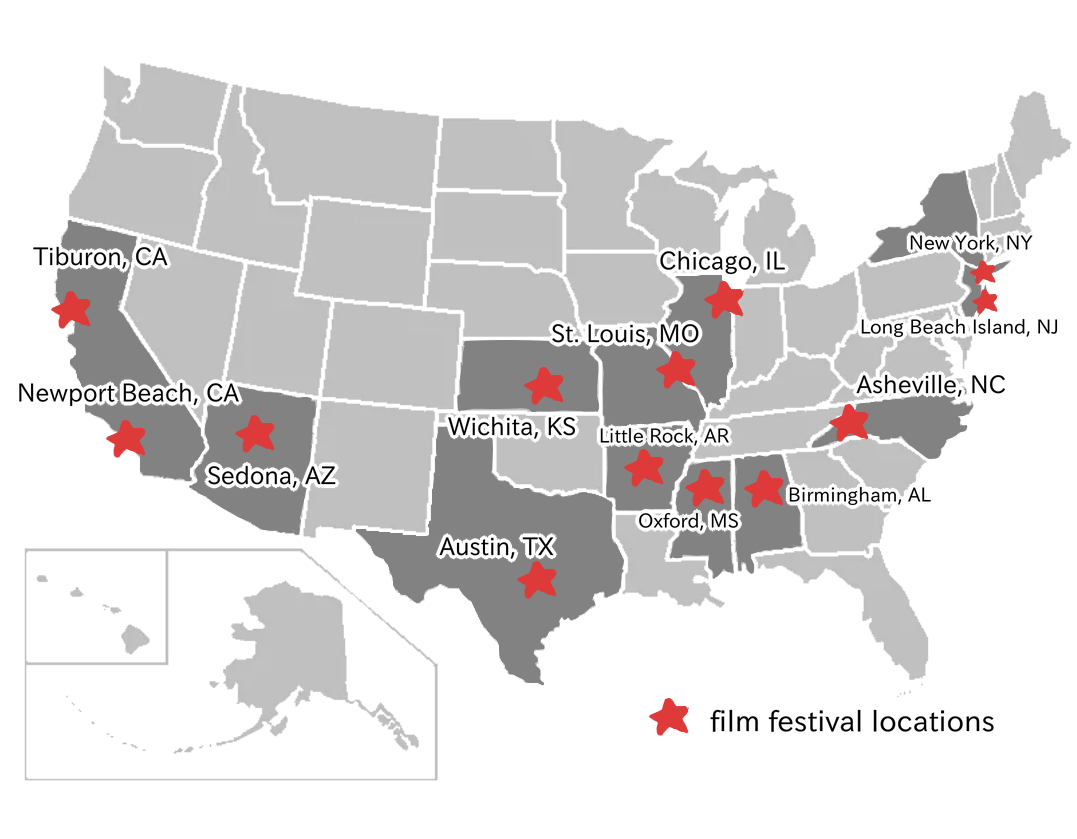
A map of Made In China (2009 film) film festival locations in the USA.

== Release ==
Made in China garnered multiple awards, including the Grand Jury Award for Best Narrative Feature at South by Southwest, the Silver Hugo Award at the Chicago International Film Festival, the German Independence Audience Award at Oldenburg, the Chicken & Egg Award for Emergent Female Director, and Outstanding Achievement in Filmmaking at the Newport Beach Film Festival. Critic Roger Ebert described Made in China as "an exemplary demonstration of guerrilla filmmaking, shot at speed but conceived and assembled with wit, charm, coherence and a distinctively wry view of 21st-century entrepreneurialism." Distributed by IFC Films, the film was praised by Variety for its "sharp sense of humor" and "pleasingly offbeat sensibility."[9]

In a SXSW interview with IndieWire, Krant emphasized her commitment to creative authenticity and resourcefulness.[7]The film made its world premiere on March 15, 2009, at the South by South West (SXSW) film festival in Austin, Texas, where is won the Grand Jury Award for Best Narrative Feature, Made in China had a film festival tour across the United States in 2009: showing at the Newport Beach Film Festival; HATCHFest Asheville; Little Rock Film Festival; Lighthouse International Film Festival; the Friar's Club Comedy Film Festival; the Sidewalk Film Festival; the Chicago International Film Festival; the Hawaii International Film Festival; and the St. Louis International Film Festival.

In 2010, the film was featured at the Oxford Film Festival, the Sedona International Film Festival, the Tiburon International Film Festival, the Tallgrass Film Festival and the Gene Siskel Film Center. It also made an international appearance at: the 2009 Oldenburg International Film Festival in Germany where it won the Audience Favorite Award; the 2009 Calgary International Film Festival, the 2010 Victoria Film Festival in Canada; and the 2011 Singapore International Film Festival. The film would later be picked up for distribution by IFC Films and was subsequently made available on IFC's video-on-demand platform in June 2010. Made in China also became available to rent and buy on Sundance Now and iTunes in 2011.

== Reception ==
=== Critical reception ===
As a micro-budgeted production, Made in China encapsulated many elements of the typical mumblecore scene. Honolulu Star-Advertiser's Burl Burlingame called it "a thoroughly charming, quirkily funny independent film with a standout performance that would never have been touched in a million years by a major studio". Nick Otten from the St. Louis Beacon describes it as the classic example of a true indie film, one that is created by friends. Made in China was "Wes Anderson’s whimsy meets David Mamet’s love of duplicity" according to IndieWire's Brian Brooks. A sentiment that is echoed by Richard Whittaker of The Austin Chronicle, who called the film a "semi improvised comedy" that "dances charmingly between the ingenuity of human inventiveness and the deviousness of the duplicity people commit on each other." Whittaker specifically notes how the film invites audiences to sympathise with Johnson rather than ridicule him for his "sense of wonder".

Melanie Addington, a writer for the Oxford Eagle and assistant director for Oxford Film Festival in 2009, wrote that "instead of just squashing Johnson’s dreams, the audience travels along with him as a sort of business coming-of-age story. His naivety charms us and we hope along with him that things may work out." Addington further gave notice to director Krant's influence on Made in China citing that: "Her own ingenuity helped mark the film as a stand out at festivals this year." Made in China is "a very American story set in China" Addington describes and she credited Jackson Keuhn and Dan Sumpter' performances for helping to "make the film what it is – a charming all American tale." Scott Roxborough of The Hollywood Reporter called the film a "globalization comedy" and "crowd-pleaser", referring to it as a story of an inventor "who follows his American dream all the way to Shanghai." Film producer Ted Hope said that as much as Made in China was "ambitious, inventive, funny and moving", the center of the film "Jackson’s comic and committed star turn." Hope referred to both Kuehn and Krant as "the real deal" and recommended Made in China to audiences as a piece of "diverse & unique film culture" which showcased ambitious indie film-making, one that created a lot from very little.

Duane Byrge of The Hollywood Reporter praised the two main actors’ performances for how convincing they were, with Jackson Kuehn as the good-natured Texan and Sumpter as a versatile scammer. Byrge also gave credit to the “zingy, light” music done by Matt Mariano, which he said contributed to the “aw-shucks whimsy” of the film. Ray Pride of Newcity Film describes Made in China as “micro-budgeted yet inspired” and “small but sure-footed”.

=== Accolades ===
Year	Award	Category	Recipient	Result	Ref.
2009	SXSW Film Festival	Grand Jury Prize for Best Narrative Feature	Made in China	Won	
2009	SXSW Film Festival	Chicken & Egg Emergent Woman Director	Judi Krant	Won	
2009	Newport Beach Film Festival	Outstanding Achievement in filmmaking	Made in China	Won	
2009	Oldenburg International Film Festival	German Independence Award: Audience Award	Made in China	Won	
2009	Chicago International Film Festival	Silver Hugo Award for New Directors Competition	Judi Krant	Won	
