= Made in China 2025 =

Chinese industrial policy

Made in China 2025 (MIC25, MIC 2025, or MIC2025; Chinese: 中国制造2025; pinyin: Zhōngguó zhìzào èrlíng'èrwǔ) is a national strategic plan and industrial policy to further develop the manufacturing sector of the People's Republic of China, signed by Chinese Premier Li Keqiang in May 2015. As part of the thirteenth and fourteenth five-year plans, China aims to move away from being the "world's factory"—a producer of cheap low-tech goods facilitated by lower labor costs and supply chain advantages. The industrial policy aims to upgrade the manufacturing capabilities of Chinese industries, growing from labor-intensive workshops into a more technology-intensive powerhouse with more value added.

Made in China 2025's goals include increasing the Chinese-domestic content of core materials to 40 percent by 2020 and 70 percent by 2025. To help achieve independence from foreign suppliers, the initiative encourages increased production in high-tech products and services, with its semiconductor industry central to the industrial plan, partly because advances in chip technology may "lead to breakthroughs in other areas of technology, handing the advantage to whoever has the best chips – an advantage that currently is out of Beijing’s reach."

Since 2018, following a backlash from the United States and Europe, the phrase "MIC2025" has been de-emphasized in government and other official communications, while the program remains in place; the Chinese government continues to invest heavily in technologies identified by the plan. In 2018, the Chinese government committed to investing roughly US$300 billion into achieving the industrial plan. In the wake of the COVID-19 pandemic, at least an additional $1.4 trillion was also invested into MIC2025 initiatives. Given China's current middle income country status, the practicality of its disproportionate expenditure on pioneering new technologies has been called into question.

In 2024, the majority of MIC2025's goals were considered to be achieved, despite U.S. efforts to curb the program. Chinese industrial sectors tied to MIC2025 saw substantial progress, reaching parity or technical leadership when compared to international firms. China's dependence on imported goods and foreign firms was reduced, while Chinese industrial competitiveness increased. However, it also led to duplicated and inefficient investments and a biased emphasis on production over consumption for the overall economy.

== Background and stated goals ==
Since the 2010s, China has become an emerging superpower as the second largest economy and the largest one on a purchasing power parity (PPP) basis. It faces manufacturing competition from countries with lower wages like Vietnam, as well as from highly industrialized countries. In 2013, the Ministry of Industry and Information Technology convened a group of scholars and technical experts to prepare a report about how China could become a manufacturing superpower; this report later developed into Made in China 2025. To maintain economic growth, standards of living, and meet the demand of its increasingly educated workforce, China undertook stimulating the potential of its economic and technological competitiveness with MIC 2025, to become a "world-leading manufacturing power." Alan Wheatley of British think tank Chatham House indicated, in 2018, that a broad and growing Chinese middle class is necessary for the country's economic and political stability.

China believes in its industrial policy programs, which it sees as key to its economic success. Its leaders hope that government investment in crucial technology sectors will lead to a strong position in the Fourth Industrial Revolution. The key objective of the Made in China 2025 program is, in a world which it views as increasingly dominated by U.S.-China competition, to identify key technologies, such as AI, 5G, aerospace, semiconductors, electric vehicles and biotech, indigenize those technologies with the help of national champions, secure market share domestically within China, and ultimately capture foreign markets globally.

The Center for Strategic and International Studies in Washington, D.C. described MIC 2025 as an "initiative to comprehensively upgrade Chinese industry", which is directly inspired by Germany's proposed Industry 4.0 strategy. It is a comprehensive undertaking to move China's manufacturing base higher up the value chain and become a major manufacturing power in direct competition with the United States.

=== Policies ===
To achieve the stated goals, a number of specific policies have been implemented, including:

- High-tech companies are subject to reduced taxation rates.
- Incentivization of mergers and acquisitions of foreign technology companies
- Increased R&D funding by large manufacturing enterprises
- Direct state-funding of R&D
- Roadmap stating specific targets for factors such as R&D spending share, productivity, digitization and environmental protection.

Policy support for Made in China 2025 has also included government guidance funds, national laboratories, and state funded incentivization for research grants.

=== Strategic initiatives ===
The Chinese Communist Party also implemented 5 strategic initiatives:

1. Building research and development centers across China (40 to be built by 2025)
2. Development of high-end projects across all of the key industries
3. Sustainable production and worldwide leading green manufacturing practices
4. Smart manufacturing incl. robotics and digitalization
5. New materials production to be less dependent

== Key industries ==
MIC focuses on high-tech manufacturing. Industries integral to MIC 2025 include aerospace, biotech, information technology, smart manufacturing, maritime engineering, advanced rail, electric vehicles, electrical equipment, new materials, biomedicine, agricultural machinery and equipment, pharmaceuticals, and robotics manufacturing, many of which have been dominated by foreign companies. China views revenue streams in these areas as lucrative and important to China's efforts to establish a high-tech and high-value economy. MIC 2025 emphasizes green and sustainable production in these areas.

MIC 2025 lists the following 10 key industries that the Chinese government targets for becoming a world leader.

Key Industries of the Made in China 2025
Industry sector	Description
Information technology	AI, IoT, smart appliances
Robotics	AI, machine learning
Green energy and green vehicles	energy efficiency, electric vehicles
Aerospace equipment	
Ocean engineering and high tech ships	
Railway equipment	
Power equipment	
New materials	
Medicine and medical devices	
Agriculture machinery	

Premier Li has indicated advanced standards in industries are absolutely essential to foster innovation and eliminate bottlenecks in industrial development. China has a growing middle class who are demanding higher quality goods and services. Compared with overseas competition, the quality and innovation of Chinese goods have not caught up. Premier Li talked about the quality revolution. This revolves around entrepreneurship and craftsmanship. It will involve embracing a culture of continuous innovations and refinement in quality of goods produced.

Some companies that have been named as leaders of the key industries are:

- Baidu (AI, autonomous vehicles)
- Alibaba (e-commerce)
- Tencent (e-commerce)
- Megvii (AI)
- DJI (AI, drones)
- BAIC (new energy vehicles)
- Geely (new energy vehicles)
- NIO (new energy vehicles)
- BYD (new energy vehicles)
- SMIC (semiconductors)
- Fujian Jinhua Integrated Circuit (DRAM manufacturing)
- Huawei (semiconductors, telecommunications and consumer electronics)
- BBK Electronics (consumer electronics)
- Xiaomi (consumer electronics)
- Aviation Industry Corporation of China (aerospace)
- CRRC (rail)
- Sinopharm (medicine)
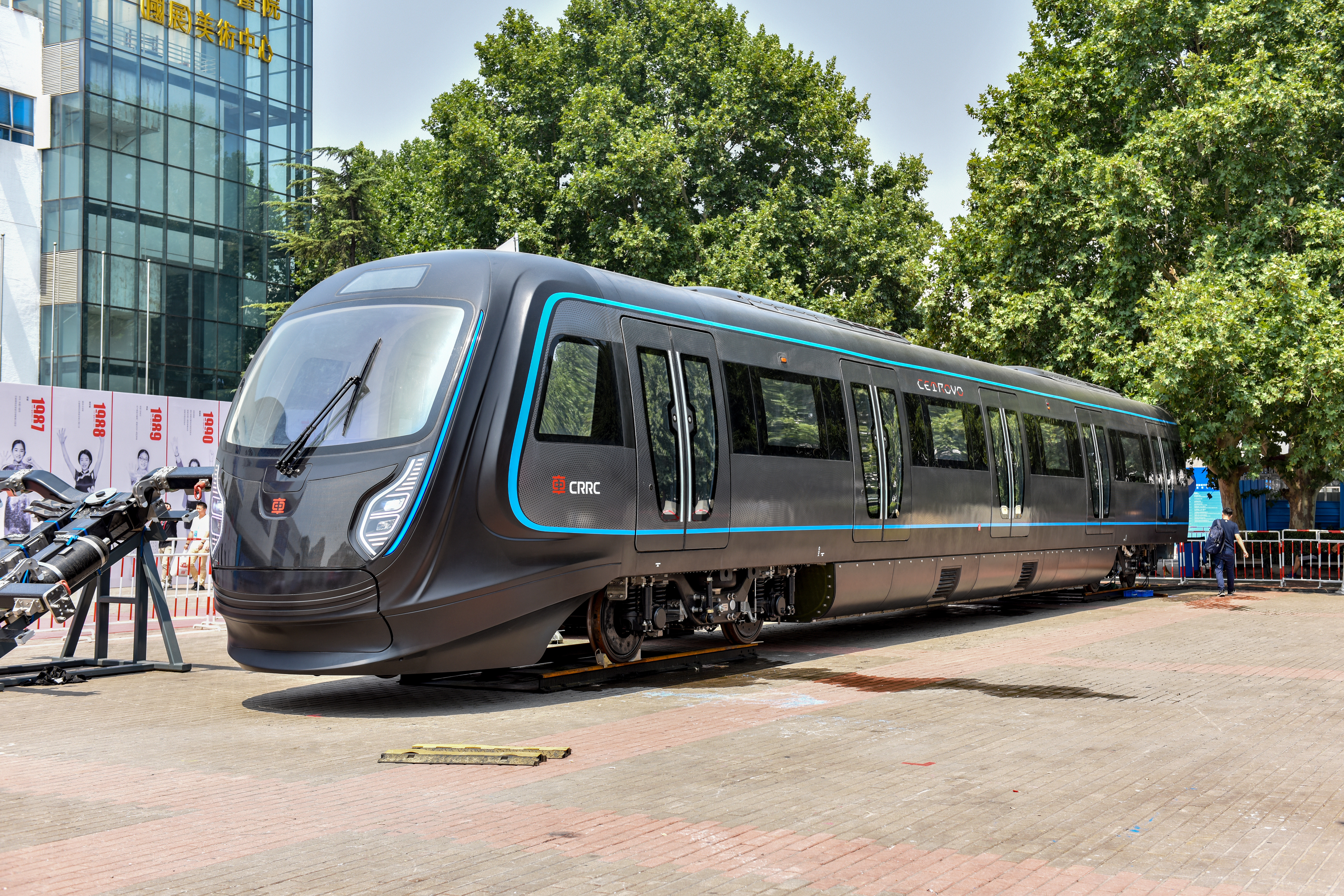
CRRC carbon fibre metro concept

DJI Mavic Pro Platinum Drone in flight

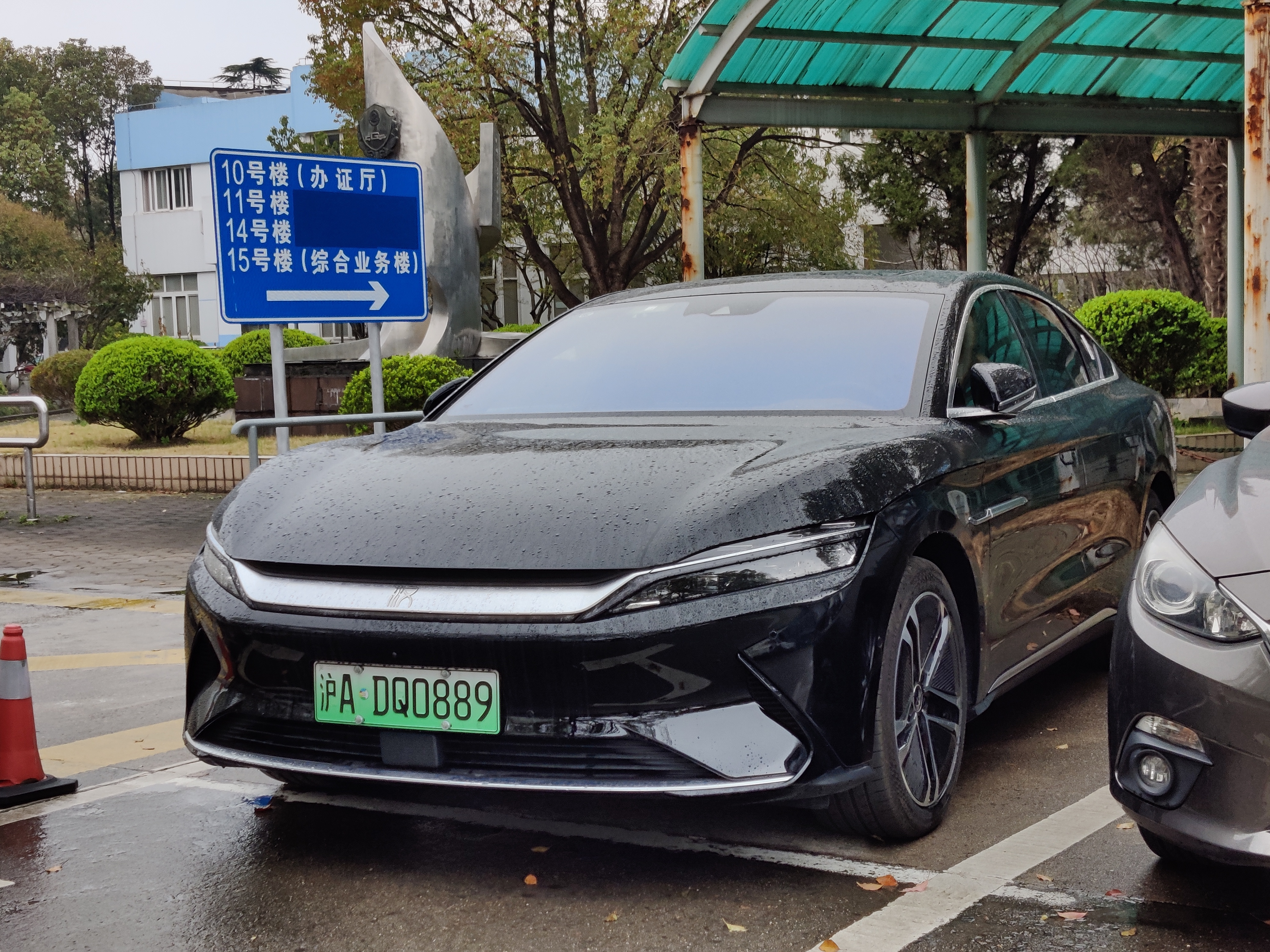
BYD Han EV

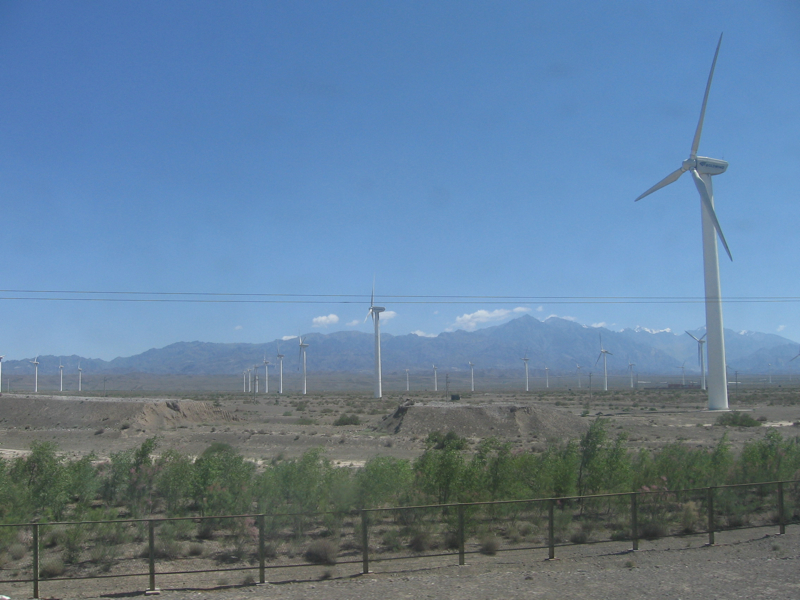
Goldwind turbines in operation at a wind farm outside Ürümqi

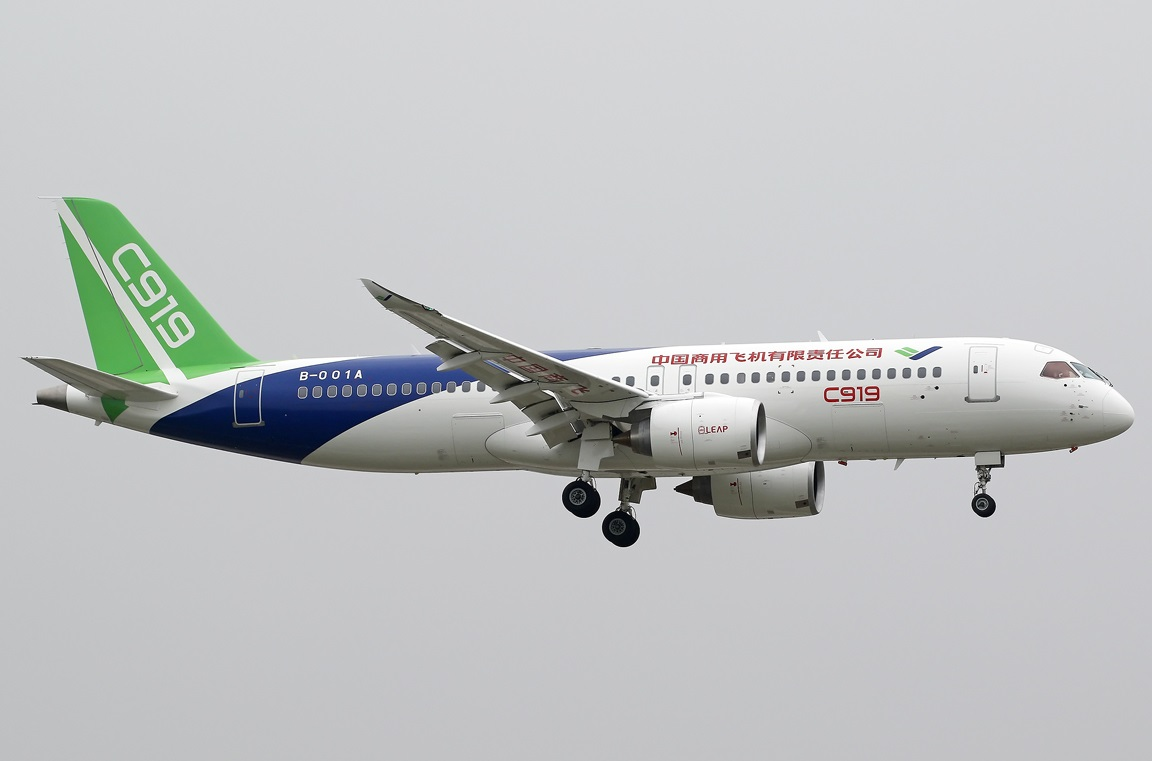
Comac C919 Aircraft

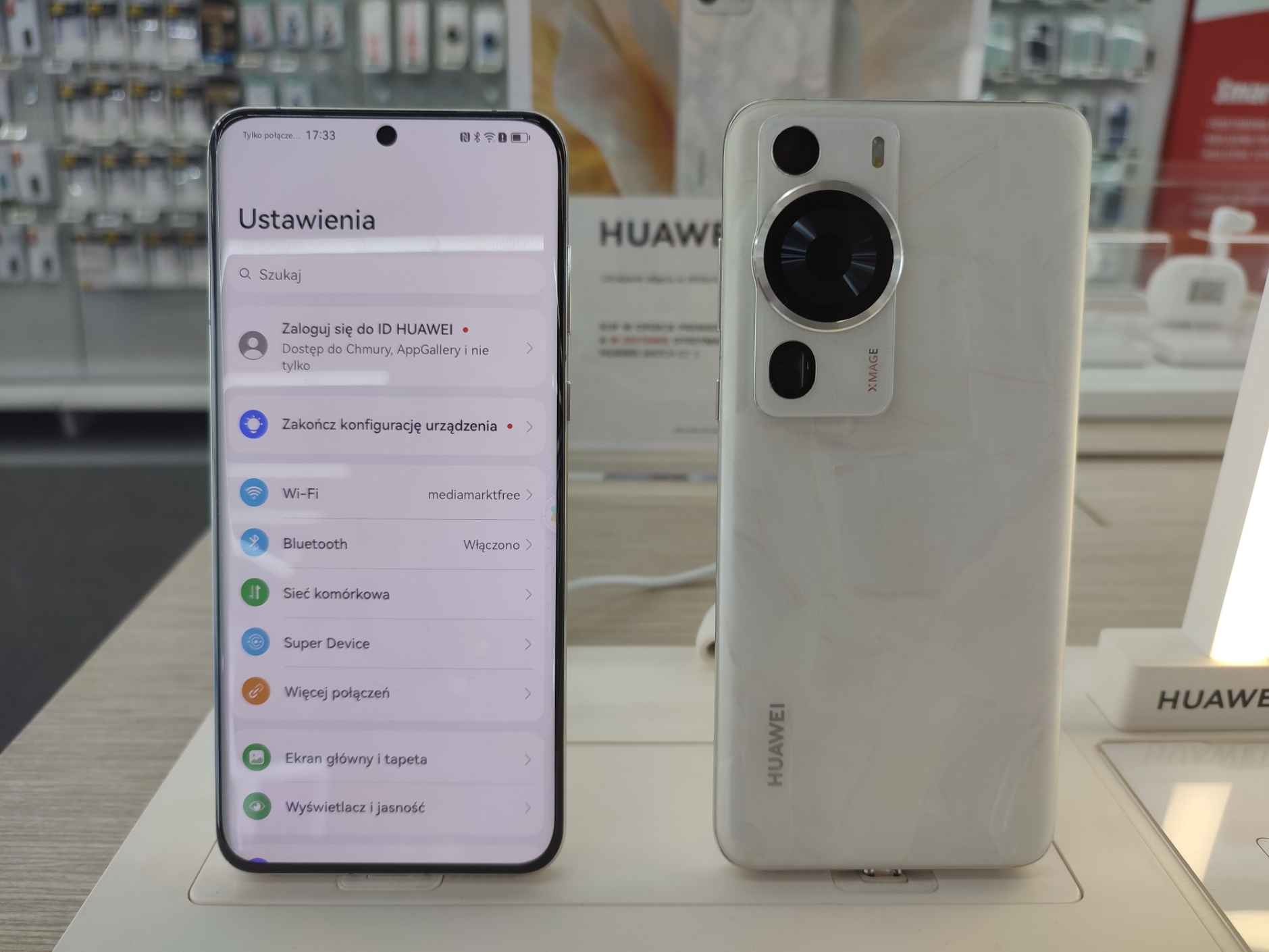
Huawei P60 Pro smartphone

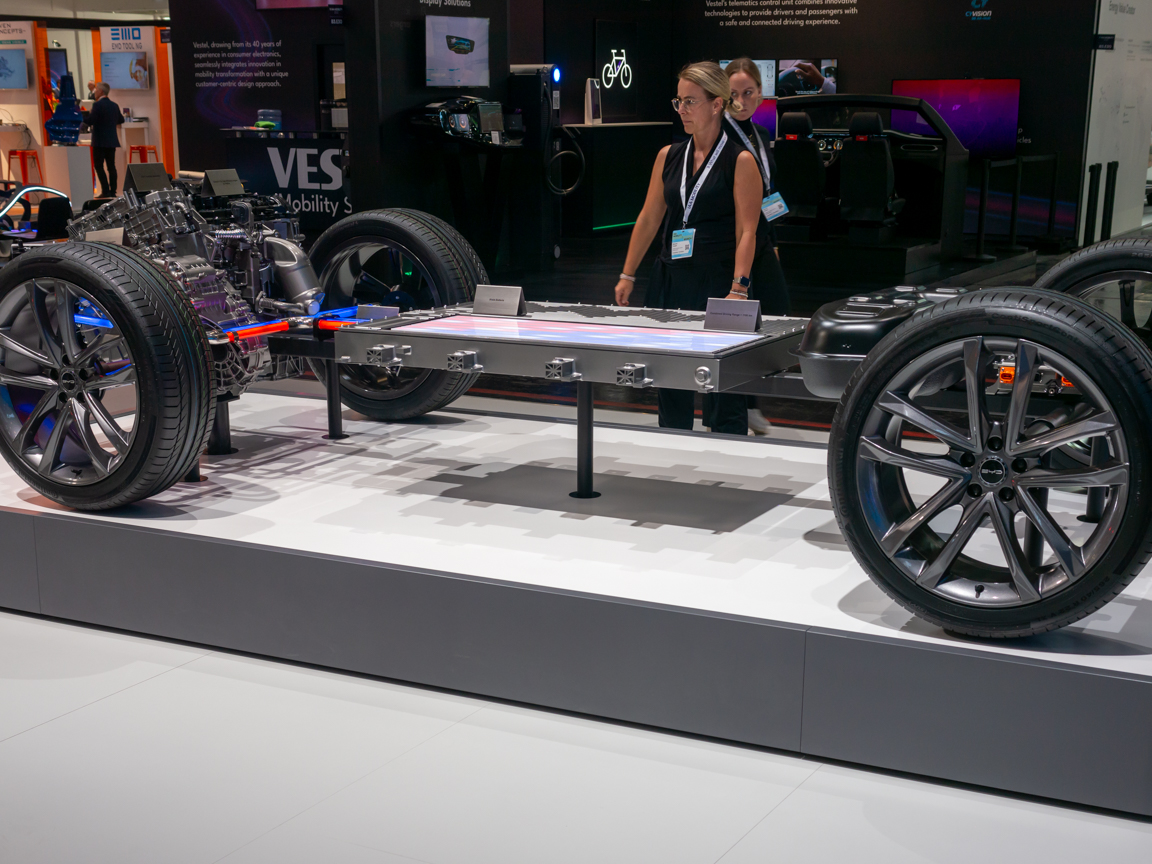
BYD blade battery packs showcased at the IAA Summit 2023, Germany

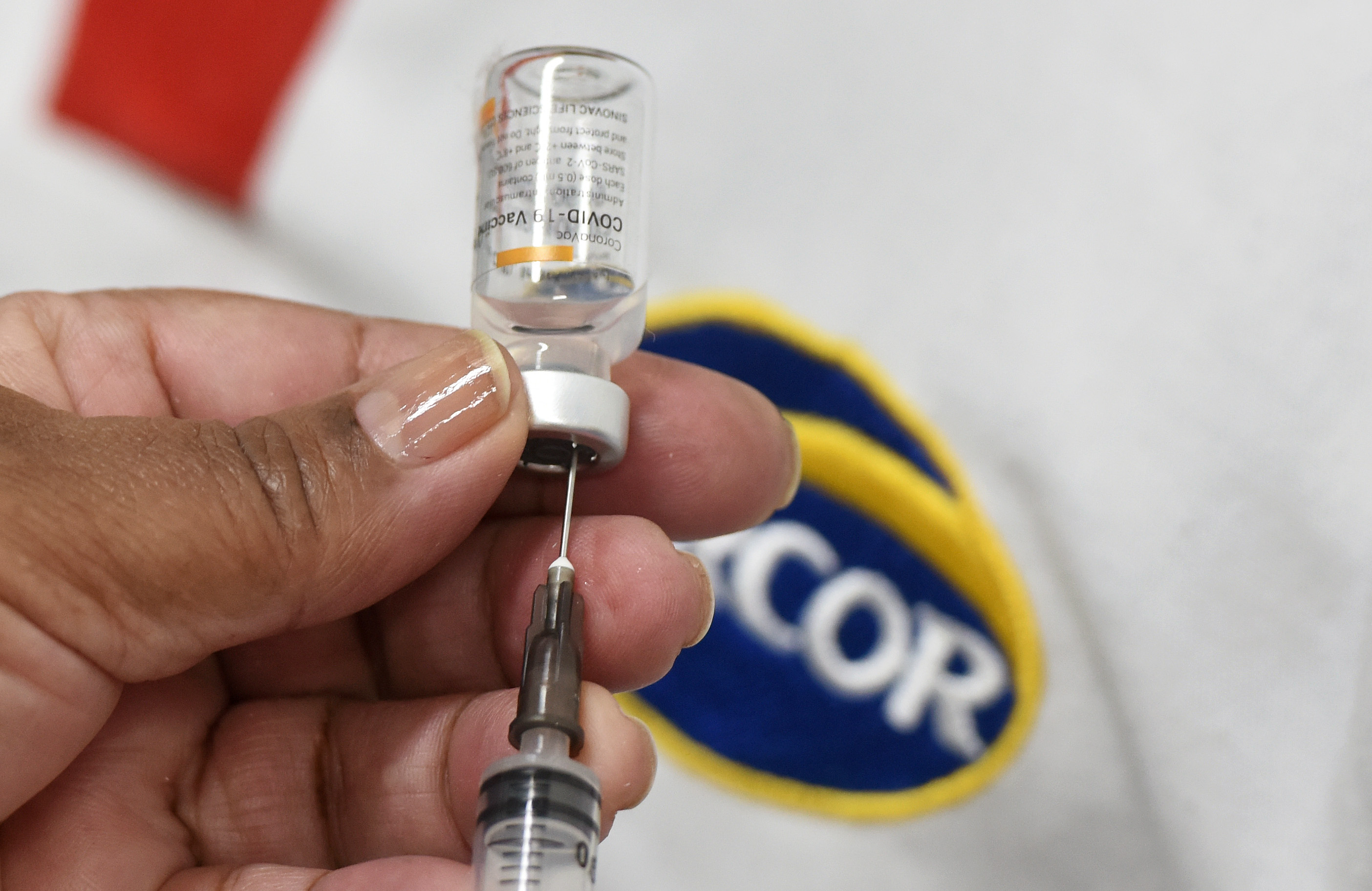
Sinovac COVID-19 Vaccine

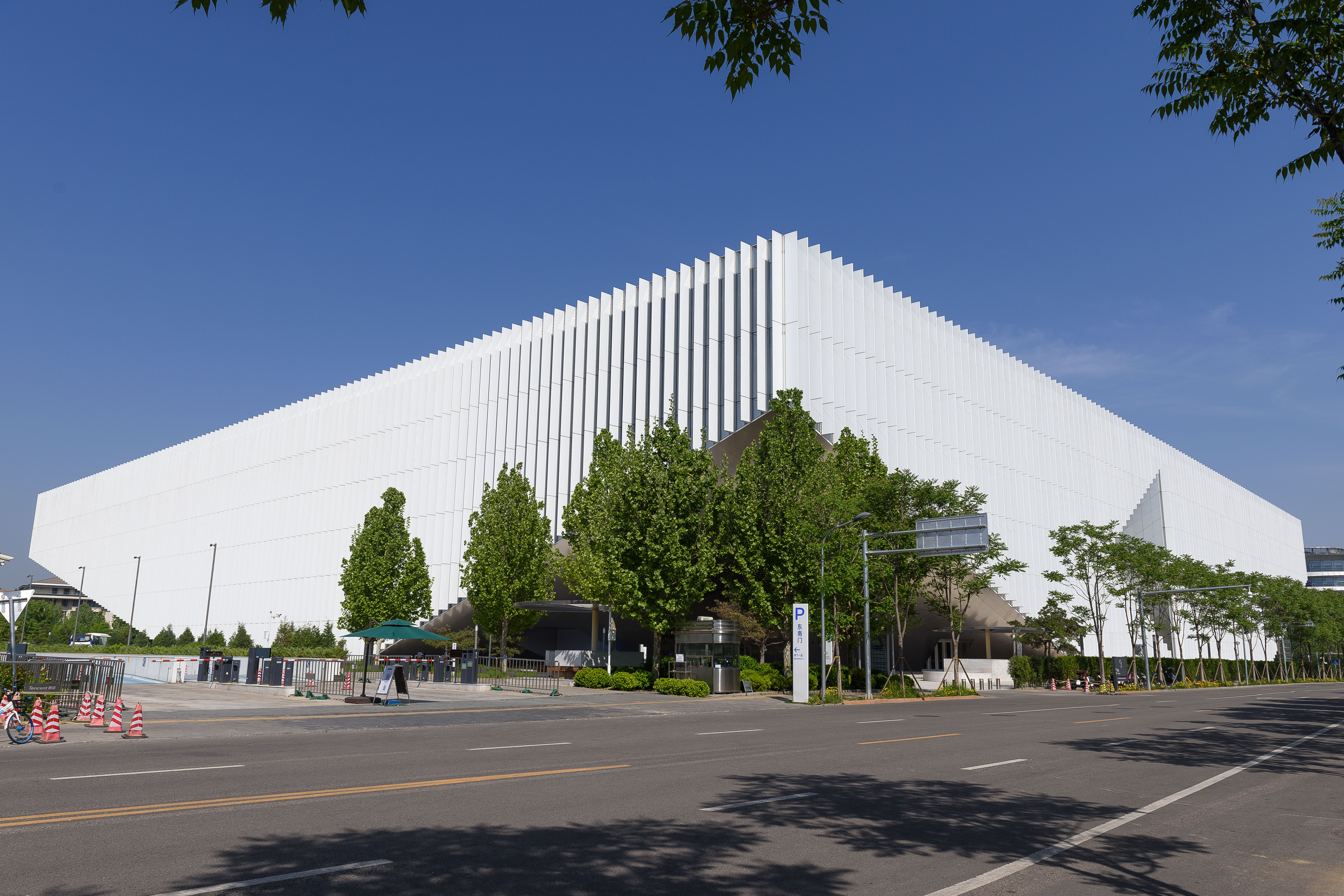
Tencent Beijing Office

== Funding ==
The amount of state funding to support the MIC 2025 industries has not been publicized, but is estimated to be "in the order of hundreds of billions of dollars" of state funding, low interest loans, tax breaks and miscellaneous subsidies. This amount includes US$2.9 billion for the Advanced Manufacturing Fund and US$20.2 billion for the National Integrated Circuit Industry Investment Fund.

China's investment in 5G is seen as part of the MIC 2025 program. As of early 2020, China had around 200,000 5G towers in use; by the end of the year, it aimed to have more than 500,000, with an ultimate goal of 5 million. In its 14th five-year plan, China's National People's Congress approved the spending of $1.4 trillion in 5 to 6 years to build 5G networks, "install cameras and sensors to create smart cities, and integrate this network with industry to accelerate progress in smart manufacturing."

== Reactions ==
In 2021, Barry Naughton, a professor and China expert at the University of California, San Diego, questioned whether it is sensible for China, considering it is still a middle income country, to be taking "such a disproportionate part of the risky expenditure involved in pioneering new technologies". He commented that while it does not make sense from a purely economic perspective, Chinese policymakers have "other considerations" when implementing their industrial policy such as Made in China 2025.

=== European Union ===
A European Commission published report calling for the European Union (EU) to increase its industrial and research performance and to "develop a trade policy that can ensure a level playing field for EU companies in China and for Chinese companies in the EU", in response to the Made in China 2025 (MIC 2025) policy. It recognizes MIC 2025 as being similar to the "German and Japanese approaches to innovation and economic development".

The EU Chamber of Commerce in China said that MIC 2025 would increase Chinese protectionism favouring domestic companies. In a report they have written that the MIC 2025 initiative distorts the market, and that market-based innovation provides a better way to pass through middle-income status than industrial policies. Jörg Wuttke, president of the chamber, said: "Very often these major plans, with lots of money, where government bureaucrats decide who's the winner and who's the loser, end up in tears."

=== Japan ===
Japanese commentators note that MIC 2025 has led to growing exports of Japanese high-value goods such as semiconductor manufacturing equipment and production line robotization equipment and see it as a business opportunity, but fear that China may become a strong competitor in the long run.

=== South Korea ===
A report by the Korea International Trade Association (KITA) sees MIC 2025 as a step towards Chinese self-sufficiency, threatening Korean exports, but also acknowledges opportunities for Korea due to changing industry demands. KITA calls for a response by improving Korean innovation, preventing brain-drain and loss of intellectual property through mergers and acquisitions, preventing unfair trade practices by China and actively playing into market opportunities that arise from MIC 2025.

=== Taiwan ===
Aggressive campaigns to recruit Taiwanese chip industry talent with lucrative offers resulted in the loss of more than 3,000 chip engineers to MIC 2025, and raised concerns of a "brain drain". Charles Kau, considered Taiwan's "Godfather of DRAM" was among those to leave Taiwan for a position in China, spending five years (2015–2020) with Tsinghua Unigroup which, two years after Kau was hired, had also recruited Sun Shih-wei, former chief executive and vice chairman of United Microelectronics, Taiwan's second-largest contract chipmaker.

=== United States ===
In 2018, the Council on Foreign Relations, an American think tank, stated that MIC 2025, with its government-sponsored subsidies, is a "threat to U.S. technological leadership". The Li Keqiang Government maintained that MIC 2025 aligns with the country's World Trade Organization obligations. On June 15, 2018, the Trump administration imposed higher tariffs on Chinese goods, escalating trade tensions between China and the U.S. The tariffs primarily apply to manufactured goods included in the Made in China 2025 plan, such as those integral to IT and robotics industries.

The U.S. began individual investigations over Chinese companies participating in the MIC 2025 plan, such as Fujian Jinhua Integrated Circuit, based on concerns over technology theft and national security.

The U.S. has implemented several policy measures in response to China's MIC 2025 strategy. These measures include barring certain Chinese companies from participating in U.S. infrastructure projects, closely examining China's involvement in U.S. government-funded research, and limiting the transfer of aerospace technology from the U.S. and EU to China. In 2018, the U.S. Congress enacted legislation to enhance foreign investment scrutiny and fortify export control authorities. More recently, in August 2022, President Biden signed into law the CHIPS and Science Act to bolster U.S. capabilities in semiconductors and other technologies.

During a U.S. congressional hearing on MIC 2025 in February 2025, experts voiced concerns over China's rapid progress in advanced manufacturing, warning that the United States risked "losing the next industrial revolution". In the same year, the Trump administration attempted to counter China's progress and encourage the reshoring of manufacturing by imposing tariffs.

=== United Kingdom ===
In November 2025, a BBC Panorama investigation reported that state-directed Chinese outward investment linked to the Made in China 2025 policy had targeted high-technology sectors in the United Kingdom, including companies whose technology had potential military applications. Drawing on data compiled by the research group AidData, the programme said that China had financed tens of billions of pounds of projects and acquisitions in the UK since 2000, and relative to the size of its economy and population, the UK was the leading G7 destination for such investment.

== Evaluation ==
The policy has been evaluated as largely successful despite US efforts attempting to stifle it through sanctions, although not all of the major goals in the plan to achieve self-sufficiency in technology were achieved.

In October 2024, Bloomberg published a series of articles underscoring China's steady strides in positioning itself as a global leader in future-focused industries, despite more than six years of U.S. tariffs, export controls, and financial sanctions. Research from Bloomberg Economics and Bloomberg Intelligence concludes that the "Made in China 2025" initiative, designed to secure China's leadership in emerging technologies, has been "largely a success". Among the 13 critical technologies tracked by Bloomberg, China has achieved global leadership in five: high-speed rail, graphene, unmanned aerial vehicles, solar panels, and electric vehicles and lithium batteries, while swiftly closing the gap in seven others. The research also points to a growing global acceptance of Chinese electric vehicles, an increasing reliance on Chinese smartphones for internet access, and the widespread adoption of Chinese solar panels for residential energy. It concludes that this progress underscores China's increasing influence in industries critical to future economic growth.

A 2024 analysis by the South China Morning Post found that 86 percent of the over 260 goals proposed under the plan have been achieved. The report found targets in sectors such as electric vehicles and renewable energy were well surpassed, all the goals in robotics, agriculture machinery, biopharmaceuticals and marine engineering were fulfilled, though some targets such as advanced photolithography technology, intercontinental passenger aircraft and broadband internet satellite networks were unfulfilled. The sector with the lowest completion rate was new materials, at 75 percent.

In the fields of aeronautics and semiconductors, a significant dependency on foreign technology remained. In the electric vehicle sector, however, the target of producing 3 million vehicles per year was far surpassed by 2023 already.

An April 2025 report by the European Chamber of Commerce in China found that China surpassed its goals for achieving domestic dominance in the auto industry. Of the ten strategic sectors highlighted in the report, China has achieved technological dominance in shipbuilding, high-speed rail, and electric cars. However, it has yet to meet its targets in aerospace, advanced robotics, and the growth rate in manufacturing value-added.

According to an independent long-term report conducted by the Rhodium Group for the United States Chamber of Commerce, MIC2025 successfully reduced China's dependencies on imports and foreign firms, increased Chinese firms and products' competitiveness, and helped Chinese industries to gain parity or technological leadership against international firms. The report concluded that MIC2025 helped China to make substantial progress in industrial sectors, create reverse dependencies, and dominate global supply chains. But the intense capital market also produced duplicative and inefficient efforts, and an imbalanced bias toward supporting producers over consumers. Overall, MIC2025 was successful in achieving its goals.

Bloomberg's reporting raises concerns for the U.S., suggesting that policies intended to contain China's rise may inadvertently isolate the U.S. and negatively impact its businesses and consumers. Adam Posen, president of the Peterson Institute for International Economics and a researcher for various governments and central banks, cautions that "China’s technological rise will not be stymied, and might not even be slowed, by U.S. restrictions," except for those "draconian measures" that could simultaneously hinder innovation in the U.S. and globally.

In June 2024, China announced a plan aiming to be the world leader in science and technology innovation by 2035.

== See also ==
- Made in China
- Made in USA
- Make in India
- Buy American Act
- Berry Amendment
- Industrial policy
- Techno-nationalism
- Thousand Talents Program
- China–United States trade war
- Middle income trap
