= Made in Taiwan =

Describes products produced in Taiwan

- Traditional Chinese: 臺灣製造
- Simplified Chinese: 台湾制造
Transcriptions
Standard Mandarin
- Hanyu Pinyin: Táiwān Zhìzào
- Wade–Giles: T′ai²-wan¹ Chih⁴-tsao⁴
Hakka
- Pha̍k-fa-sṳ: Thòi-vàn Chṳ-chho
Southern Min
- Hokkien POJ: Tâi-oân Chè-chō
- Tâi-lô: Tâi-uân Tsè-tsō

Made in Taiwan (Chinese: 臺灣製造; pinyin: Táiwān zhìzào; Pe̍h-ōe-jī: Tâi-oân Chè-chō), frequently depicted as MIT, is the country of origin label affixed to products to indicate that the said product is made in Taiwan.

== History ==
As the economy of Taiwan increased production, the Made in Taiwan label was applied to products ranging from textiles, plastic toys, and bikes in the 1980s to laptops and computer chips in the 1990s; over 80% of the world's notebook computer design is made in Taiwan. In the 1980s, "Made in Taiwan" became iconic, earning Taiwan recognition around the world.

In 1991, the Taiwan External Trade Development Council (TAITRA) commissioned design firm Bright & Associates to improve the quality and image of the Made in Taiwan brand.

In 2010, there was a push by the Ministry of Economic Affairs to promote certified made-in-Taiwan products in Taiwan, including stocking participating items at major chain stores.

Made in Taiwan marks are often affixed to goods not made in Taiwan, a form of origin fraud.

== Popular culture ==
In 2023 Clarissa Wei released a cookbook called Made in Taiwan: Recipes and Stories of the Island Nation.

== Gallery ==
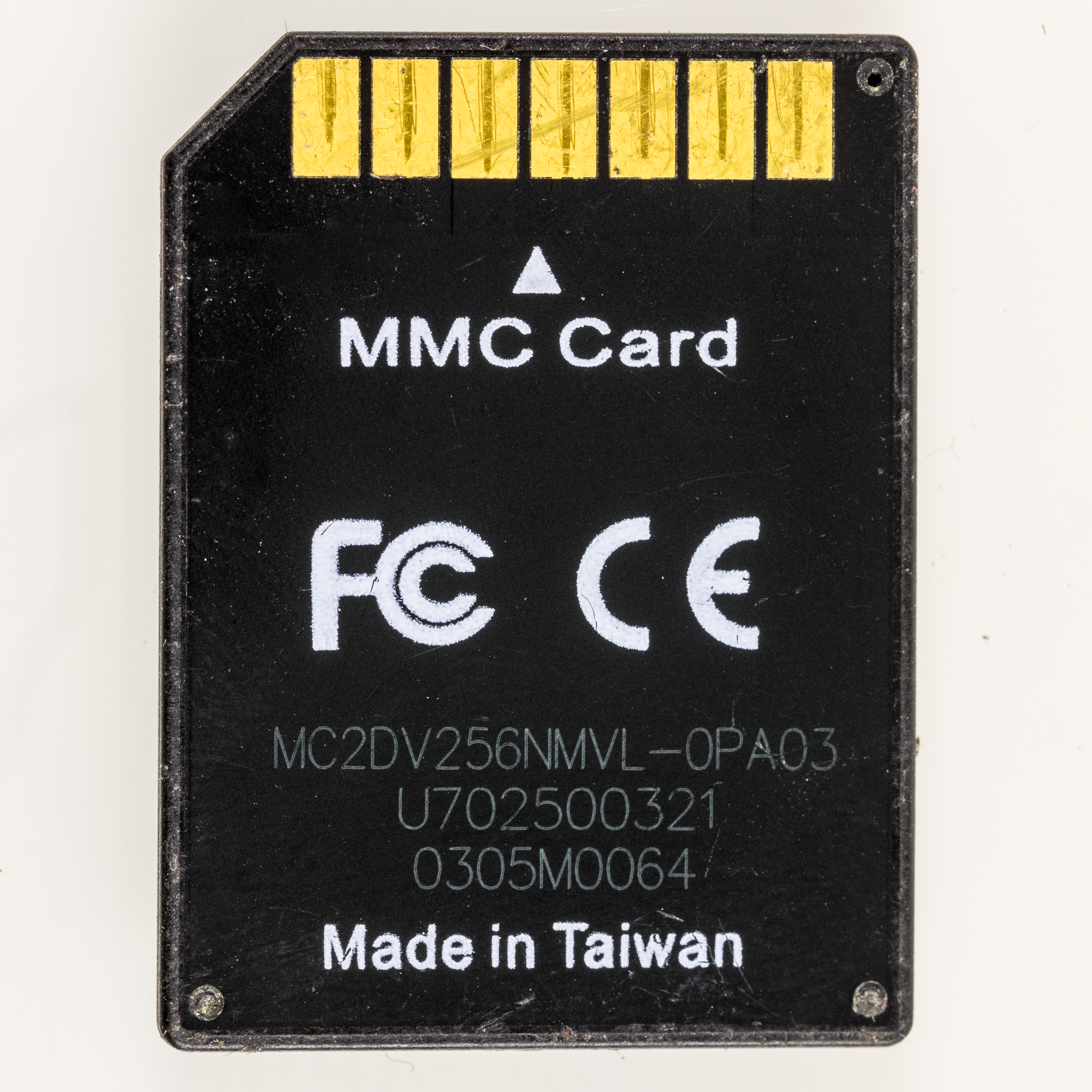
MultiMediaCard made in Taiwan

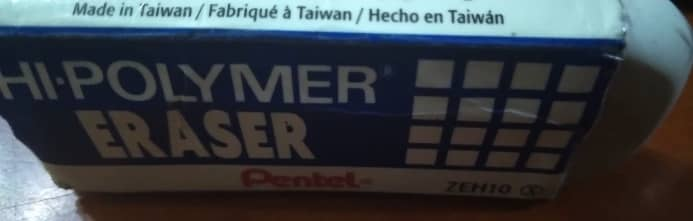
Pentel eraser made in Taiwan

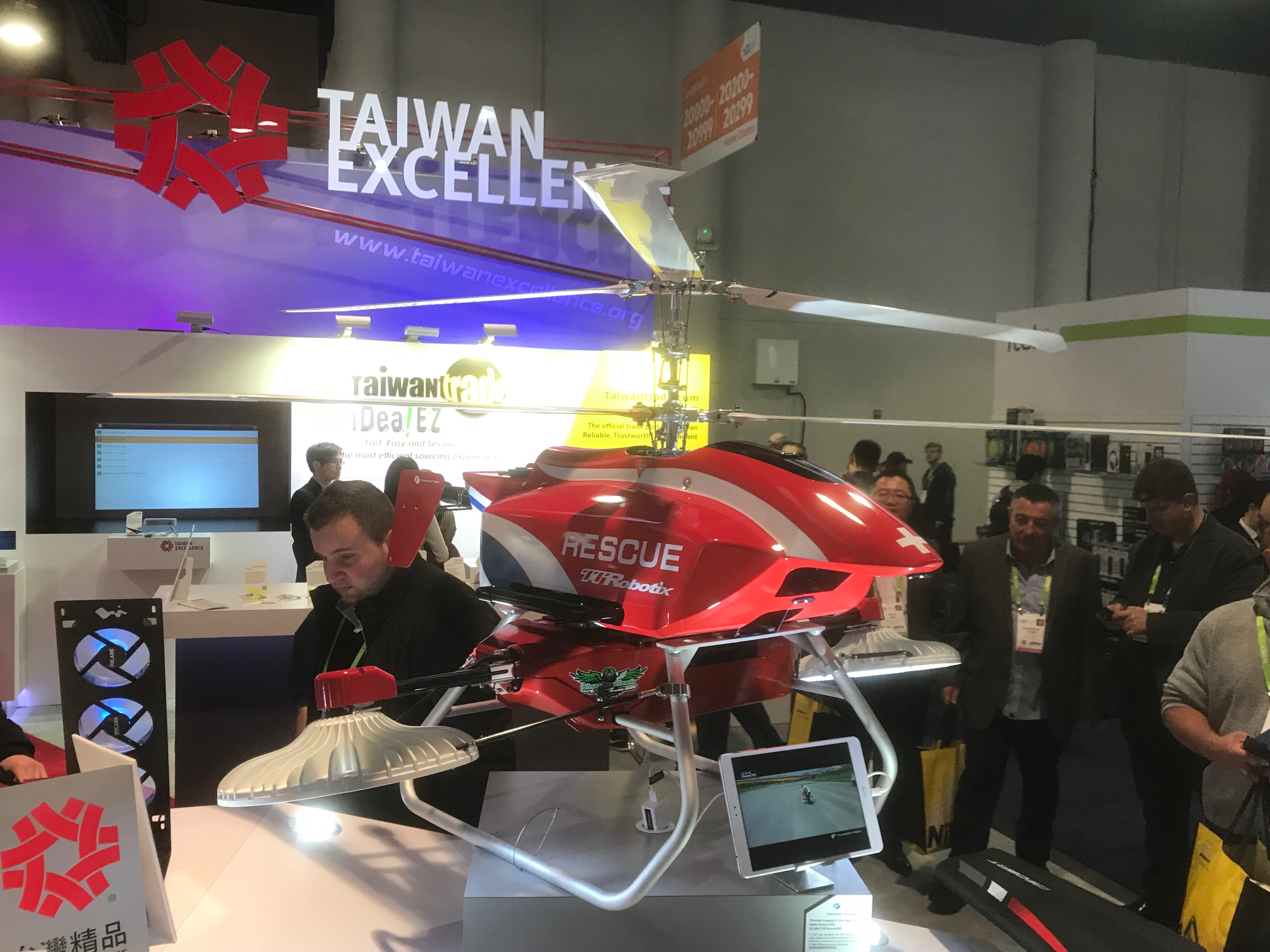
An example of helicopter model Thunder Tiger

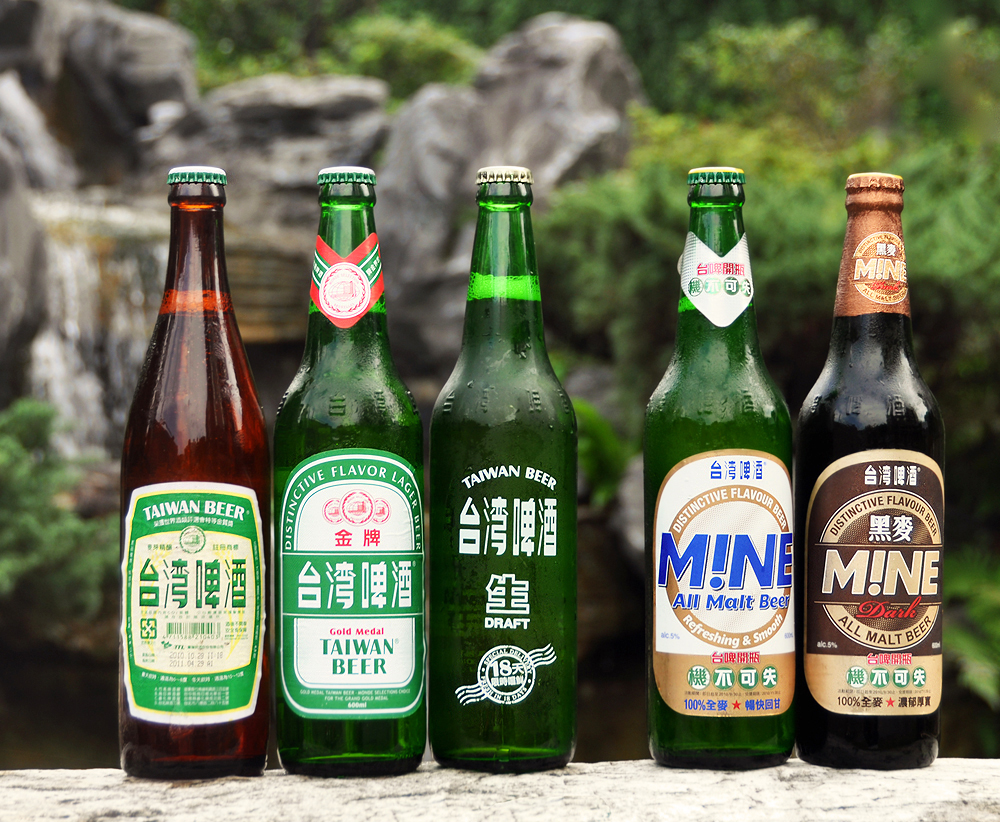
Taiwan Beer

== See also ==
- Taiwan Miracle
- 100% Cinta Indonesia
- Manufacturing in Japan
- Manufacturing in South Korea
- Made in China
