= Geographical indications in Indonesia =

Geographical Indications in Indonesia are a form of intellectual property consisting of an "indication which identifies goods and/or a product as originating from a particular region of which its geographical environment factors including nature, labor, or combination of both factors are attributable to a given reputation, quality, and characteristics of the produced goods and/or product". Geographical indications can be registered based on the Law on Marks and Geographical Indications Foreign geographical indications can only be registered if they are recognised or registered there. As of August 2021, 93 Indications have been registered.

== Registered Geographical Indications ==
As of August 2021, 93 Geographical Indications had been registered, most of which originating from Indonesia. The list of Indonesian GIs is shown below:

Country of origin	GI Name	Registration date	Geographical origin
Indonesia	Kopi Arabika Kintamani Bali	2008-12-05	Domestic
France	Champagne	2009-11-14	Foreign
Indonesia	Mebel Ukir Jepara	2010-04-28	Domestic
Indonesia	Lada Putih Muntok	2010-04-28	Domestic
Indonesia	Kopi Arabika Gayo	2010-04-28	Domestic
Peru and Chile	Pisco	2010-07-01	Foreign
Indonesia	Tembakau Mole Sumedang	2011-04-25	Domestic
Indonesia	Tembakau Hitam Sumedang	2011-04-25	Domestic
Italy	Parmigiano Reggiano	2011-10-21	Foreign
Indonesia	Susu Kuda Sumbawa	2011-12-15	Domestic
Indonesia	Kangkung Lombok	2011-12-15	Domestic
Indonesia	Madu Sumbawa	2011-12-15	Domestic
Indonesia	Beras Adan Krayan	2012-01-06	Domestic
Indonesia	Kopi Arabika Flores Bajawa	2012-03-28	Domestic
Indonesia	Purwoceng Dieng	2012-07-20	Domestic
Indonesia	Carica Dieng	2012-07-20	Domestic
Indonesia	Vanili Kepulauan Alor	2012-10-19	Domestic
Indonesia	Kopi Arabika Kalosi Enrekang	2013-02-15	Domestic
Indonesia	Ubi Cilembu Sumedang	2013-04-24	Domestic
Indonesia	Salak Pondoh Sleman Jogja	2013-06-21	Domestic
Indonesia	Minyak Nilam Aceh	2013-09-10	Domestic
Indonesia	Kopi Arabika Java Ijen-Raung	2013-09-10	Domestic
Indonesia	Kopi Arabika Java Preanger	2013-09-10	Domestic
Indonesia	Bandeng Asap Sidoarjo	2013-10-09	Domestic
Indonesia	Kopi Arabika Toraja	2013-10-09	Domestic
Indonesia	Kopi Robusta Lampung	2014-05-13	Domestic
Indonesia	Tembakau Srinthil Temanggung	2014-05-13	Domestic
Indonesia	Mete Kubu Bali	2014-07-21	Domestic
Indonesia	Gula Kelapa Kulonprogo Jogja	2014-07-21	Domestic
Indonesia	Kopi Arabika Java Sindoro Sumbing	2014-12-01	Domestic
Indonesia	Kopi Arabika Sumatera Simalungun	2015-02-20	Domestic
Indonesia	Pala Balik Pulau (Balik Pulau Nutmeg)	2015-05-06	Domestic
Indonesia	Kopi Liberika Tungkal Jambi (Tungkal Jambi Liberica coffee)	2015-07-23	Domestic
Indonesia	Cengkeh Minahasa (Minahasa cloves)	2015-08-13	Domestic
Indonesia	Beras Pandanwangi Cianjur (Pandawangi Cianjur rice)	2015-10-16	Domestic
Indonesia	Kopi Robusta Semendo (Semendo Robusta coffee)	2015-11-20	Domestic
Indonesia	Pala Siau (Siau Nutmeg)	2015-11-20	Domestic
Indonesia	Teh Java Preanger (Java Preanger tea)	2015-12-23	Domestic
Indonesia	Garam Amed Bali (Amed Bali Salt)	2015-12-23	Domestic
Thailand	Lamphun Brocade Thai Silk	2016-02-22	Foreign
Indonesia	Jeruk Keprok Gayo Aceh (Gayo Aceh Tangerine)	2016-03-22	Domestic
Indonesia	Kopi Liberika Rangsang Meranti (Rangsang Meranti Liberica Coffee)	2016-05-02	Domestic
Indonesia	Lada Hitam Lampung (Lampung Black Pepper)	2016-05-02	Domestic
Indonesia	Kayumanis Koerintji (Koerintji Cinnamon)	2016-05-26	Domestic
Mexico	Tequila	2016-07-18	Foreign
Italy	Grana Padano	2016-07-18	Foreign
Indonesia	Tunun Gringsing Bali (Gringsing Bali Woven Fabric)	2016-07-18	Domestic
Indonesia	Tenun Sutera Mandar (Mandar Silk Woven Fabric)	2016-09-09	Domestic
Indonesia	Kopi Arabika Sumatera Mandailing (Sumatera Mandailing Arabica Coffee)	2016-09-09	Domestic
Indonesia	Pala Tomandin Fakfak (Tomandin Fakfak Nutmeg)	2016-09-09	Domestic
Indonesia	SoE Mollo Orange	2016-09-21	Domestic
Indonesia	Dried Cengkeh Moloku Kie Raha (Moloku Kie Raha Clove	2016-09-21	Domestic
Indonesia	Mete Muna (Muna Cashew)	2016-09-21	Domestic
Indonesia	Kopi Robusta Temanggung (Temanggung Robusta Coffee)	2016-12-06	Domestic
Indonesia	Sawo Sukatali Sumedang (Sukatali Sumedang Sapodilla)	2016-12-14	Domestic
Indonesia	Kopi Robusta Empat Lawang (Empat Lawang Robusta Coffee)	2017-02-10	Domestic
Indonesia	Beras Raja Uncak Kapuas Hulu (Kapuas Hulu Raja Uncak Rice)	2017-02-28	Domestic
Indonesia	Tenun Ikat Sikka (Sikka Ikat Woven Fabric)	2017-03-08	Domestic
Indonesia	Komering Duku	2017-04-07	Domestic
Indonesia	Kopi Arabika Sumatera Koerintji (Sumatera Koerintji Arabica Coffee)	2017-04-17	Domestic
Indonesia	Kopi Robusta Pinogu (Pinogu Robusta Coffee)	2017-05-03	Domestic
Indonesia	Kopi Robusta Pupuan Bali (Pupuan Bali Robusta Coffee)	2017-05-29	Domestic
Indonesia	Tenun Ikat Tanimbar (Tanimbar ‘Ikat’ Woven Fabric)	2017-07-03	Domestic
Indonesia	Kopi Robusta Tambora (Tambora Robusta Coffee)	2017-07-03	Domestic
Indonesia	Kopi Arabika Sumatera Lintong (Sumatera Lintong Arabica Coffee)	2017-12-21	Domestic
Indonesia	Pala Dukono Halmahera Utara (North Halmahera Dukono Nutmeg)	2018-02-06	Domestic
Indonesia	Bareh Solok (Solok rice)	2018-02-14	Domestic
Indonesia	Kopi Arabika Flores Manggarai (Flores Manggarai Arabica Coffee)	2018-03-07	Domestic
Indonesia	Kopi Arabika Sipirok (Sipirok Arabica Coffee)	2018-07-13	Domestic
Indonesia	Kopi Arabika Pulo Samosir (Pulo Samosir Arabica Coffee)	2018-07-13	Domestic
United Kingdom	Scotch Whisky	2018-09-07	Foreign
Italy	Modena/ Di Modena	2018-09-07	Foreign
Indonesia	Kopi Robusta Kepahiang (Kepahiang Robusta Coffee)	2018-10-17	Domestic
Indonesia	Ikan Uceng Temanggung (Uceng Temanggung Fish)	2018-12-11	Domestic
Indonesia	Celuk Gianyar Bali Silver Handicraft	2018-12-27	Domestic
Indonesia	Sidat Marmorata Poso (Poso Marmorata Eel)	2019-04-30	Domestic
Indonesia	Tenun Ikat Alor (Alor ‘Ikat’ Woven Fabric)	2019-04-30	Domestic
Indonesia	Tenun Songket Alor (Alor ‘Songket’ Woven Fabric)	2019-04-30	Domestic
Indonesia	Kopi Robusta Sidikalang (Sidikalang Robusta Coffee)	2019-07-18	Domestic
Indonesia	Gula Lontar Rote (Rote Palm Sugar)	2019-07-23	Domestic
Indonesia	Kopi Robusta Java Bogor (Java Bogor Robusta Coffee)	2019-07-23	Domestic
Indonesia	Doyo Benuaq Tanjung Isuy Jempang West Kutai Woven Fabric	2019-08-13	Domestic
Indonesia	Silungkang ‘Songket’	2019-08-23	Domestic
Indonesia	Kopi Arabika Baliem Wamena (Baliem Wamena Arabica Coffee)	2019-08-23	Domestic
Indonesia	Kopi Robusta Pasuruan (Pasuruan Robusta Coffee)	2019-08-23	Domestic
Indonesia	Sagu Lingga (Lingga Sago)	2019-08-23	Domestic
Indonesia	Kopi Arabika Tanah Karo (Tanah Karo Arabika Coffee)	2019-08-23	Domestic
Indonesia	Kopi Robusta Rejang Lebong Bengkulu (Rejang Lebong Bengkulu Robusta Coffee)	2019-09-26	Domestic
Indonesia	Lada Putih Malonan Kutai Kartanegara Kaltim (Malonan Kutai Kartanegara East Kalimantan White Pepper)	2019-09-26	Domestic
France	Cognac	2019-09-27	Foreign
Indonesia	Banda Island Nutmeg	2019-11-18	Domestic
Indonesia	Batik Tulis Nitik Yogyakarta (Yogyakarta ‘Batik Tulis Nitik’)	2019-11-21	Domestic
Indonesia	Garam Gunung Krayan (Krayan Mountain Salt)	2019-11-22	Domestic

== Protection outside Indonesia ==
Kopi Arabika Gayo is (in addition of its status as Geographical Indication in Indonesia) also register as a Protected Geographical Indication in the European Union as well as the UK. Bali Amed salt / garam Amed Bali has been registered as a Protected Designation of Origin in the European Union.

In the framework of negotiations between the European Union and Indonesia on a Free Trade Agreement, in 2019, 47 products were suggested to be eligible for protection after entry into force of that agreement in the future, followed by two more in 2021: Kopi Robusta Pagar Alam and Salak Sibetan Karangasem Bali.

== See also ==
- 100% Cinta Indonesia
