= Railway equipment industry in China =

Railway equipment includes electric multiple units (EMUs), locomotives and railway freight cars, in terms of the Chinese railway planning, that large railway freight car and bullet train is the direction of development of China's railway equipment manufacturing industry. The gap of locomotive manufacturing industry between China and developed countries is relatively large, especially in high-power electric locomotive and EMUs. After technology acquisition, China has acquired high-power electric locomotives, diesel locomotives and 200 km/h EMUs. Presently, the localization rate of parts and components of electric locomotive and EMUs reaches 70 per cent and 75 per cent respectively, and China has developed 300 km/h EMUs based on digesting and absorbing overseas' new technologies.

== International manufacturers ==
In terms of the international railway equipment market that global railway equipment industry is on a more monopoly competitive circumstance. The merger of locomotives and railway car plants has restructured global railway equipment market that global railway equipment giant dominated more market share. Presently, there are three global giant of global locomotive and railway car plants—Germany's Siemens, France's Alstom and Canada's Bombardier, they hold 55 per cent of total global market share (each 14%, 18% and 23%) and advanced technology and higher market concentration. Bombardier holds the largest market share of global railway equipment technology and sales market and Alstom remains advantage on EMUs and ordinary single-decker and double-decker electric locomotive market.

== Chinese manufacturers ==
Although the number of China's railway equipment manufacturers is quite large and products is relatively various, but the weakness is that they produce the speed of below 200 km/h general train's low-end products and the production capacity is surplus and price competition is in chaos; and the lack of design and production capacity of advanced technology of railway equipment which can not meet the demands of high-end products. In order to adapt to the demand of current railway development, the Chinese government took a measure to pay huge amounts of money through international cooperation with international leading manufacturers to introduce high-end products, digesting and absorbing advanced manufacturing technology to upgrading Chinese railway equipment's technology level.

== High-speed rail ==
The high-speed railway equipment manufacturing industry is the priority fields that supporting by governmental policy. In terms of the current circumstance of China's railway equipment manufacturing industry, is in a low level of technology, therefore, government policies are encouraging localization and the introduction of advanced technology then digestion and absorption, the Chinese government spent 10 billion yuan to buy advanced international technology for state-owned enterprises to upgrade their technology capability and offered huge amounts of orders.

== Investment ==
The total railway fixed assets investment of China's Eleventh Five-Year Plan period was 1.5 trillion yuan, of which the purchase of rolling stock and the investment of technological transformation is 250 billion yuan. It is estimated that by 2010, the amount of China's locomotives will reach around 19,000 units, EMUs will reach around 1000, railway carriages about 45,000 units and railway freight car will reach 700,000 units.

== Development ==
The development of the Chinese railway equipment manufacturing industry has benefited from the growth of railway investment. This has promoted the competitive advantage of railway equipment enterprises; manufacturers with technology for high-end products are expected to be the main beneficiaries. Due to the higher standard of high-speed railway technology, it is expected that Chinese railway equipment parts suppliers will need a certain period of time to enter the high-speed railway equipment market.

== See also ==
- Rail transport in China
