= Made in China =

Country of origin label

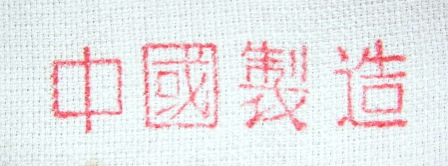
中國製造; Zhōngguó zhìzào; 'Made in China'

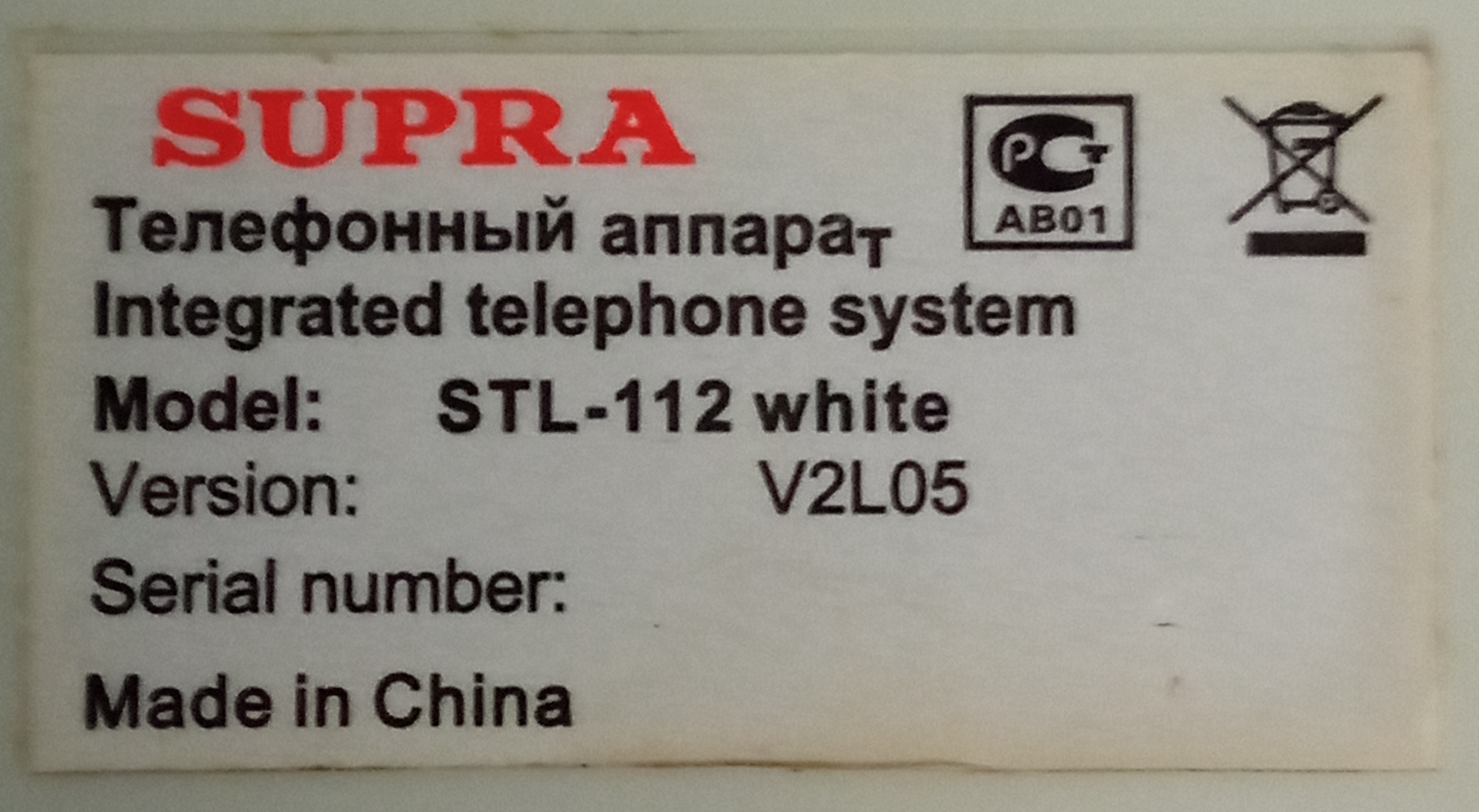
The label on a Supra STL-112 phone

"Made in China" or "Made in PRC" is a country of origin label, often in English, affixed to products wholly or partially made in the People's Republic of China (PRC). The label became prominent in the 1990s, when foreign companies based in the United States, Europe, and Asia moved their manufacturing operations to China due to China's low production costs of clothing, electronics, and other goods.

Goods "made in China" have been produced through supply chains that usually included multiple countries along the way.

== History ==
The label was first widely used during the Japanese occupation of China in the Second Sino-Japanese War, when Chinese civilians began to boycott Japanese-made products. At the time, China's economy lacked a framework for effective industrialization. As such, boycotting foreign-made products and buying domestic ones at that time became a way to put pressure on the Japanese economy under the so-called "national salvation effort".

By the early 21st century, goods labeled "Made in China" were often only partially made in China, such as the US-designed iPhone. In 2015, China devised "Made in China 2025", the government's ten-year plan to update national manufacturing base by rapid development of local high-tech industry.

The phrase Made in China is undergoing a transformation from its traditional associations with low quality to now encompassing advanced applications such as artificial intelligence and semiconductor technology.

== Quality and perception ==
According to long-term research published by European Central Bank in 2011, the quality of Chinese products exported to EU markets is high relative to other developing economies, even at low unit cost. The study challenged the assumption that low-cost products from China are of low quality and suggested that the quality of Chinese products is similar to that of the most technologically advanced competitors and economies. The study also indicated that Chinese products were an anomaly in the relationship between price and quality; while products from most countries became relatively expensive as the quality increased, Chinese products remained affordable despite the upgrading quality.

According to a Pew Research Center survey of 12 countries in November 2023, the quality of Chinese technology products is seen as generally well-made, but worse than American products. Respondents from few countries, such as Turkey and India, held particular negative views toward Chinese products.

== See also ==
- Economy of China § Industry and manufacturing
- Uyghur Forced Labor Prevention Act
- China Blue
- 100% Cinta Indonesia
- Made in Taiwan
- Make in India
- United States–China Relations Act of 2000
