= 100% Cinta Indonesia =

2009 consumer awareness campaign

Logo

100% Cinta Indonesia (Indonesian: "100% Love Indonesia") is a campaign launched in 2009 to promote Indonesian brands and products. Although the campaign was initially meant as a consumer awareness program to promote Indonesian products and brands, the campaign has transformed into social movement to appreciate and love everything Indonesian, not just brands and products but also foods, arts, crafts, traditional and popular culture, and many aspects of Indonesia.

== History ==
The campaign was initiated in 2009 by Ministry of Trade and Ministry of Communication and Information of the Republic of Indonesia to change the perception and mindset of Indonesian people that Indonesian products have lesser quality than imported ones. The "Cinta Indonesia" campaign and the launching of ”100% Cinta Indonesia” logo was inaugurated by President Susilo Bambang Yudhoyono during the opening of the annual handicraft exhibition Inacraft in Jakarta Convention Center, Wednesday, 22 April 2009. According to the President, the campaign objective is to increase appreciation and nurture pride in using Indonesian products. Indonesian brands, products, and services were encouraged to put the ”100% Cinta Indonesia” logo on their product packages and promotion materials. The logo is free for Indonesian companies to use. Although it belongs to the government of Indonesia, it is considered public domain.

== Logo and slogan ==
The meanings of "100% Cinta Indonesia" campaign logo:

- The colors in the logo represent the colors of Indonesian archipelago. Yellow represents the land and blue represents the sea. Red and white represent the national colors of the Indonesian flag. Red symbolizes bravery and white symbolizes purity.
- The colors also symbolize Indonesian diversity and creativity.
- The typography of the letters exceeding the color rectangular borders was meant to imply creativity beyond the lines, or thinking "out of the box", to express that Indonesia is a creative nation.
- The simple message contained in the logo is easily and widely understood internationally crossed boundaries of cultures. The logo is meant to express that Indonesia deserves to be recognized as an advanced and creative nation.
- International meanings of the logo: To declare to the world that all of the works, arts, brands, and products that have been made were created out of our 100% love as Indonesians. What has been bought, used, enjoyed, and displayed reflects our appreciation for our culture, tradition, and love for our country. All in the name of love for the nation of Indonesia.
- Domestic meanings of the logo: As the expression of common effort, to support each other in collective perception to build Indonesian identity as a creative nation. Our 100% love is absolute, everything is expressed in what we make, create, taste, and use. In our heart is always Indonesia.

== See also ==
- Geographical indications in Indonesia
