= Early political career of Xi Jinping =

Xi Jinping, the general secretary of the Chinese Communist Party and leader of China since 2012, was assigned as a mishu to Minister of Defense Geng Biao following his graduation from Tsinghua University in 1979. In 1982, Xi requested he be transferred outside Beijing, leading him to be assigned as deputy party secretary of Zhengding County in Hebei, where he became the CCP committee secretary in 1983. In Hebei, Xi promoted initiatives to promote the household responsibility system and boost tourism.

In 1985, he was assigned as a vice mayor in Xiamen, Fujian, where he promoted various economic development projects. In 1988, he was appointed as the party secretary of Ningde. In Ningde, Xi focused on anti-poverty efforts. In 1990, he was assigned to Fuzhou City as the Municipal Committee Secretary. Fuzhou's economy grew under Xi, and he promoted various projects such as the Changle International Airport. In 1995, Xi was elevated to deputy secretary of the Fujian Provincial Party Committee. He was tasked with rural affairs, and focused on attracting foreign investment. He became the Vice Governor of Fujian in 1999, before becoming the Governor in 2000. He focused on reforming and modernizing Fujian's economy.

In 2002, he was transferred to Zhejiang, where he served as the provincial party secretary. In Zhejiang. he implemented private business-friendly policies, developed the Double Eight Strategy, and focused on economic integration with neighboring regions. In 2007, Xi was transferred to replace the dismissed Shanghai party secretary Chen Liangyu for a brief period. He subsequently joined the Politburo Standing Committee the same year and became the first-ranking member of the Secretariat. In 2008, Xi was appointed the vice president and became vice chairman of the CMC in 2010, making him Hu Jintao's presumed successor as paramount leader. During this time, he oversaw CCP ideology and security, and oversaw policies regarding Hong Kong, Tibet and Xinjiang.

== Early political career ==
=== Central Military Commission ===
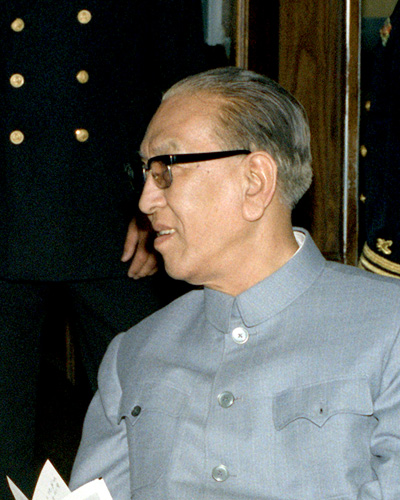
From 1979 to 1982, Xi was one of the mishus of Minister of National Defense Geng Biao

After graduating from Tsinghua University in April 1979, upon the recommendation of his mother Qi Xin, Xi was assigned to the General Office of the State Council and the General Office of the CCP Central Military Commission, where he served as one of three mishus to Geng Biao, a member of the CCP Politburo and Minister of Defense. Xi Jinping's father Xi Zhongxun and Geng Biao had known each other since 1936, and the two families were very close. To become Geng's secretary, Xi Jinping joined the military.

Xi had a monthly salary of ¥52 yuan. He participated in central meetings and decision-making, dealt with regional and foreign affairs, and became familiar with the handling of central documents, including confidential ones. Xi worked to inspect the armed forces, draft documents, and oversee Hong Kong, Macau, and Taiwan affairs together with Geng. As part of his job, Xi memorized hundreds of phone numbers, though he did sometimes sneak into his own office to take notes. Xi also listened to songs by Teresa Teng to relax, especially her song "Small Town Story". He additionally often accompanied Geng Biao to visit foreign countries. In May 1980, Xi accompanied Geng to visit the United States, including the Pentagon and the White House, where a Chinese delegation was shown a screening of The Empire Strikes Back. The Chinese delegation also toured the Kitty Hawk-class aircraft carrier.

=== Hebei ===
In 1982, Xi proposed that he return to the "base levels" to "temper" himself. It has been suggested that Xi concluded staying with Geng Biao would shrink his support base. Additionally, Geng Biao's official biography states that Geng had started to cut the number of secretaries he had, so Xi took the hint and offered his resignation. Xi said he preferred to go to Pingshan County, Hebei, where Xipaipo is located; however, he decided against it after he was told factionalism there was "explosive". He portrayed this as an idealistic act, and stated while some had wanted to regain the time they lost during the Cultural Revolution by enjoying themselves, Xi disagreed with such a view and wanted to return to the grassroots to prevent another Cultural Revolution. He expressed sorrow when other princelings, who preferred having fun, did not understand his choice. One leaked United States Embassy document states that while many people "descended into the pursuit of romantic relationships, drink, movies and Western literature as a release from the hardships of the time," Xi "chose to survive by becoming redder than red".

On 25 March 1982, Xi was appointed deputy party secretary of Zhengding County in Hebei, meaning he was "sent down" from Beijing. He quickly learned that it was very poor, with the average annual income was only 148 yuan in 1981. Together with Lü Yulan (吕玉兰), the other deputy party secretary of Zhengding, Xi wrote a letter to the central government addressing the excessive requisitions that burdened local farmers. Their efforts successfully convinced the central government to reduce the annual requisition amount by 14 million kilograms. Xi also set up a pilot project for the household responsibility system in one of the poorer communes despite reservations from some in the local leadership. In 1983, Zhengding adjusted its agricultural structure, leading to a significant increase in farmers' incomes from 148 yuan to over 400 yuan in 1984, thoroughly solving the county's economic issues. In 1983, Zhengding was the first county in Hebei to formally introduce the household responsibility system with land contracts lasting for five years or longer. This allowed Zhengding to escape its reputation as a "high-yield but poor" county,

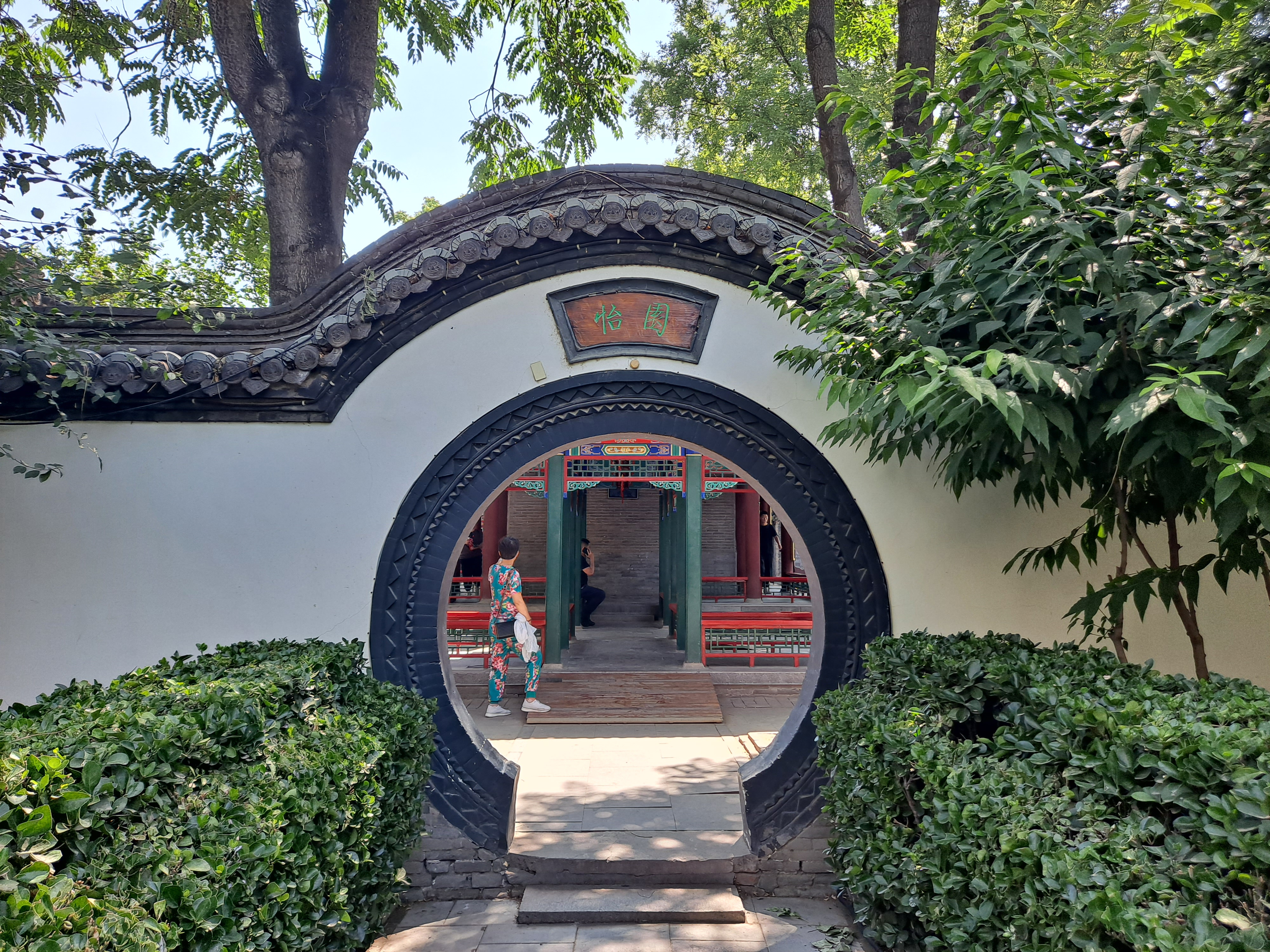
The Rongguo Mansion Film and Television Base, located in Zhengding County, Shijiazhuang, Hebei, was established during Xi Jinping's tenure working in the area.

Xi had the view that Zhengding's economy should not depend solely on agriculture. Xi initiated several development projects including the development of Nine Articles of Zhengding talents; in 1982, Xi proposed three surveys of intellectuals and professionals in various occupations and compiled the county's first talent book. He oversaw the construction of Changshan Park, the restoration of the Longxing Temple, the formation of a tourism company, and the establishment of the Rongguo Mansion and Zhengding Table Tennis Base. He also persuaded the China Teleplay Production Center to set the filming base of Dream of the Red Chamber in Zhengding and secured 3.5 million yuan to build Rongguo Mansion, which significantly boosted the county's tourism industry, generating 17.61 million yuan in revenue that year, and bringing half a million tourists in 1985.

Additionally, Xi invited prominent figures such as Hua Luogeng, Yu Guangyuan, Pan Chengxiao to visit Zhengding, which eventually led to the development of the county's "semi-urban" strategy, leveraging its proximity to Shijiazhuang for diverse business growth. Xi also oversaw that a large conference room of the CCP to be transformed into a retired cadre activities room, as well as arranging several beneficial policies for retirees. He oversaw various economic policies such as promotion of village and township enterprises in food processing, doubling their value, allowing cadres to hire workers on contracts to replace life tenure, and initiating an economic and social plan. He also oversaw refurbishment of unsafe schools with furniture and playgrounds and resolution of salary problems for private school teachers. Regarding Party building, Xi passed a resolution in 1983 to "oppose bureaucratism, [and] raise efficiency and leadership standards" and led a large-scale overhaul of rural party organizations by making them younger.

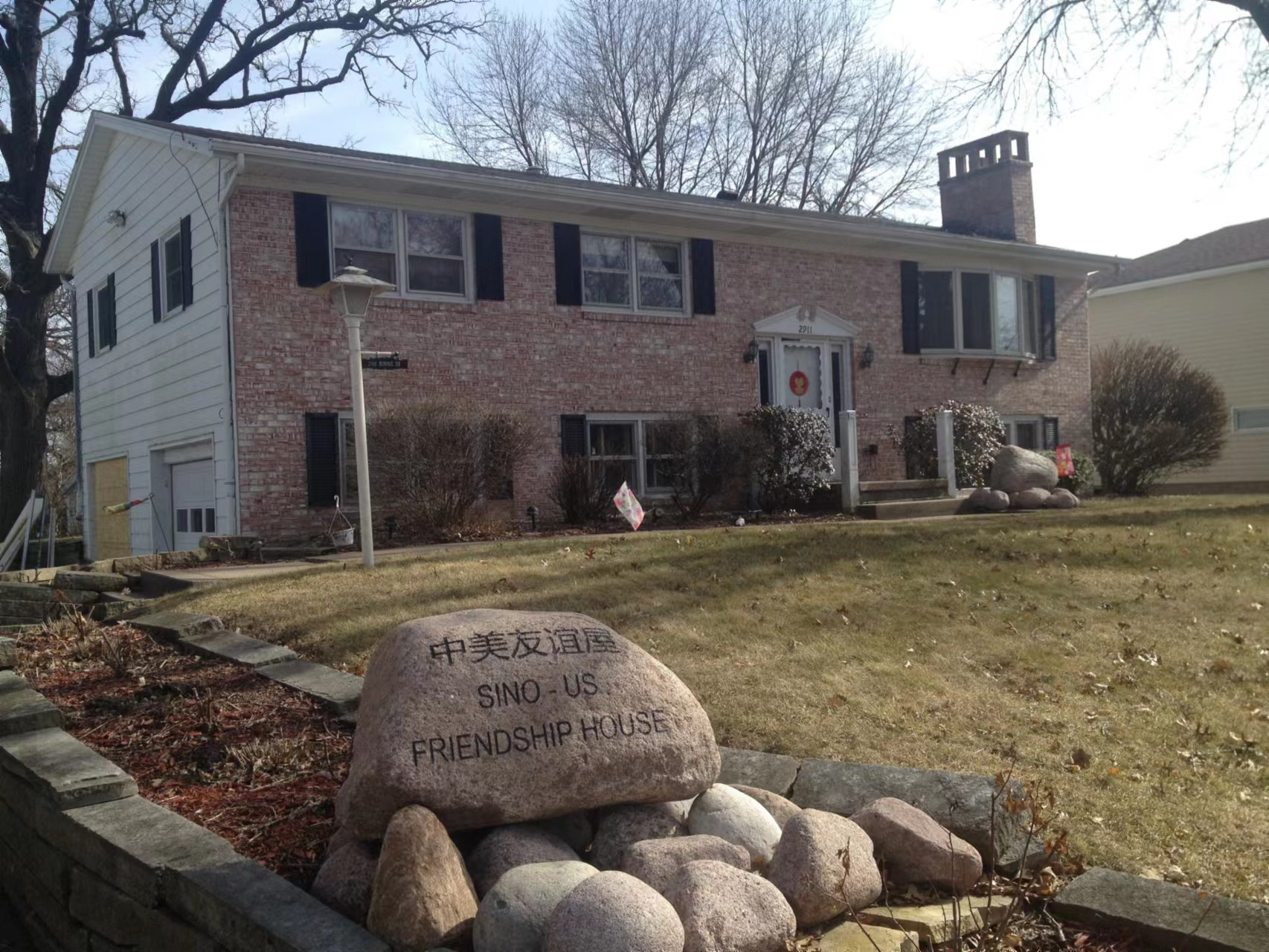
The Muscatine, Iowa house where Xi stayed with an American family during a 1985 agricultural visit to the United States. The home was turned into a museum decades later.

In 1983, Youth Bureau director Li Rui sent Young Cadre Bureau official Yan Huai to Hebei to prepare a report specifically on Xi. In the beginning of 1983, the Young Cadre Bureau's assessment of Xi was mostly positive, calling him young, vigorous, resilient, and enterprising. He became the secretary of the CCP Zhengding County Committee in July 1983, officially as a decision of the Hebei Provincial Party Committee to make cadres more "revolutionary, young, educated, and professional". In May 1983, Xi published an article in China Youth, detailing his fondness for Zhengding's culture and observing the various industrial and agricultural changes he observed since coming His name appeared for the first time in the People's Daily in June 1984, where an article observed the "great changes' and rapid economic growth that took place under Xi in Zhengding. In July 1984, a highly positive piece about Xi appeared in Hebei Youth, which depicted Xi's devotion to the CCP and China as the source of meaning in his life. In September 1984, during a briefing session chaired by He Zai, the secretary-general of the CCP Central Organization Department, Xi Jinping's strategic vision and comprehensive understanding of Zhengding County's development were highlighted. He Zai, along with Wei Jianxing, deputy head of the CCP Central Organization Department, communicated these findings to Hu Yaobang, describing Xi as a leader with a strategic outlook and a strong alliance ideology between workers and peasants.

In December 1984, Xi published his first article in the People's Daily titled "Middle and Young Cadres Must ‘Respect the Elderly'", where he argued the concept of "respecting the elderly" was manipulated by "past dynastic feudal ruling class" in ancient feudal times to avoid power struggles, but that under socialism, the concept lost its feudal connotations and "added new societal content", meaning that while not blindly obeying elder cadres, younger and middle aged cadres should give more care to them. In January 1985, both China Youth and Guangming Daily published positive articles about Xi. In 1985, Xi participated in a study tour on corn processing and traveled to Iowa, the United States, to study agricultural production and corn processing technology. During his visit to the U.S., the CCP Central Organization Department decided to transfer him to Xiamen as a member of the Standing Committee of the CCP Xiamen Municipal Committee and as vice mayor. Party Central had initially wanted Xi to be promoted to the Hebei Party Committee Standing Committee, but was opposed by Gao Yang, who felt Xi was too young, leading the Party Central to directly transfer Xi to Fujian.

=== Fujian ===
Xi arrived in Xiamen as vice-mayor on 1 June 1985. He oversaw the relocation of the poor rural residents outside of Xiamen Island. Xi was surprised that Fujian was poorer than he imagined. Soon after his arrival, the central leadership mandated retrenchment policies to cool the overheating economy, which Xi complied to. Shortly after he took office. Fujian's party secretary Xiang Nan was forced to resign and was replaced by Chen Guangyi. After Xiang's resignation, Xi drafted the first strategic plan for the development of the city, the Xiamen Economic and Social Development Strategy for 1985–2000. He led a group of officials to Beijing to consult with economists and organized a group of around 1000 scholars and officials to research 21 topics including strengthening ties with Taiwan and the policy of a free-port-based SEZ. Xi also took the lead the implementation of the policy in which Xiamen would be granted province-level status, allowing it to directly negotiate with Beijing. From August, he oversaw the resolution for Yundang Lake's comprehensive treatments, and prepared Xiamen Airlines, the Xiamen Economic Information Center, and the Xiamen Special Administrative Region Road Project. He first married Ke Lingling in 1980, but the couple divorced just after three years. He then married Peng Liyuan in Xiamen.

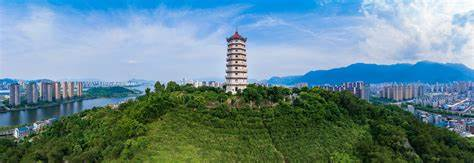
Ningde, where Xi Jinping once served as the Party Secretary, was then one of the more economically underdeveloped regions in Fujian

In September 1988, he was appointed as the secretary of Ningde before being elevated to head of the region. Ningde's economy was far worse at that time than that of Fuzhou and Xiamen. Xi condensed his work log and memories of his Ningde period into the book Getting out of Poverty, and handled local poverty eradicating efforts and local CCP building projects. Xi encouraged Ningde officials to speak up, who were reluctant due to the city's poverty. He was nevertheless pessimistic about his prospects, saying he could not bring a miracle and that development must be slower. Ningde faces problems with corruption at the time, including officials using public money to construct expensive government houses, leading Xi to act; from January to September 1989, 2,000 officials were put under investigation. 441 were prosecuted, four houses were confiscated, five were demolished, and worth ¥700,570 yuan fines were given. After a trend of officials leaving their offices to start private businesses began in the 1980s, Xi warned officials to stop using their positions for private gain or resign if they wanted to go into business. Xi additionally ordered all officials from the prefecture down to the villages to visit the grassroots, carry out investigations, and resolve issues at that level without bringing them to higher levels. He was also credited with experiments in cultivating Pseudosciaena crocea, which led to fish farms in Sanduao.

The CCP Fujian Provincial Committee decided on 1 May 1990 to assign Xi to Fuzhou City as the Municipal Committee Secretary. At the age of 38, Xi had become the youngest deputy provincial governor-level official at that time. Soon after taking office, Xi established a "leadership service receiving week", to resolve a long-standing land dispute. He also called on officials to implement the "Will act immediately" spirit. Xi maintained close ties with Hong Kong, visiting in August 1991 and again in April 1992. In February 1992 Xi endorsed the plan to turn Fuzhou General Construction Company into a joint-stock company to sell shares; the company was listed at the Shenzhen Stock Exchange in 1996. Following Deng Xiaoping's 1992 southern tour, Xi oversaw the construction of the Fuzhou 3820 Project Master Plan, which outlines Fuzhou City's growth strategy for 3, 8, and 20 years. Xi oversaw the building of the Minjiang Delta economic region. In August 1994, Xi led a trade delegation to Germany and the United Kingdom to court European investment. From 1990 to 1995, under Xi's leadership, Fuzhou's GDP grew more than 20 percent each year, exceeding ¥100 billion yuan in 1990, ¥200 billion yuan in 1993, ¥300 billion yuan in 1994, and ¥400 billion yuan in 1995. There were also resettlements of 3,441 households, or nearly 10,000 shanty dwellers, in Fuzhou's Ceng Xia slums. He also concentrated on the development of Changle International Airport, which opened in 1997. Xi negotiated with Hong Kong business tycoon Li Ka-shing to rebuild the historic sections of Fuzhou; Li's initial phase of restoration had demolished many relics to make way for luxury homes, which led to criticism for Xi, though various remedies and refurbishments were executed afterwards. Xi was also involved in military affairs; in 1991, when Unit 73121 Army was moved from Lianjiang to Fuzhou, Xi helped unit members and their family members with obtaining the urban hukou and helped enroll their children in quality schools. Xi also helped demobilized soldiers get employment and created hog farms for troops and chicken farms for the navy, while increasing spending and benefits for reserves.

In October 1995, Xi Jinping was elevated to deputy secretary of the Fujian Provincial Committee of the Chinese Communist Party. In September 1997, he was elected as an alternate member of the 15th CCP Central Committee by the 15th Party National Congress. In 1998, he became a member of the 9th National People's Congress. As deputy party secretary, Xi was in charge of rural affairs. After learning villagers at Xiapu still lived in thatched huts, he persuaded the Fujian Provincial Party Committee to allocate ¥6 million yuan to build one thousand houses. Xi also planned to resettle all sampan dwellers on land by providing housing subsidies and access to long-term employment by granting ¥500 per yuan person and the prefectures and municipalities reducing land rent for construction and forestry to give equivalent of more than ¥5,000 yuan to each person. Of the 3,676 households totaling 16,706 people in 1997, all were resettled in new villages by 1998. Additionally, two thousand She households were relocated clean water was provided to two hundred thousand She people. From 1990 to 1998, Fuzhou's GDP and revenue had grown an average of 12.6 percent and 28.5 percent each year. Approved foreign investment projects were more than 6,000, and foreign investment totaled US$6 billion. In 1999, he was promoted to the office of Vice Governor of Fujian, and became governor a year later. Xi proposed the concept of the Golden Triangle at Min River (Chinese: 闽江口金三角经济圈). He also concentrated on the Min River Water Transfer Project, the Fuzhou Telecommunication Hub, and Fuzhou Port, among others. He also focused on attracting Taiwanese and foreign investment, establishing Southwest TPV Electronics and Southeast Automobile in Fuzhou, and fostering Fuyao Glass, Newland Digital Technology and other manufacturing firms. Furthermore, he rehabilitated local cultural landmarks, including as the Sanfang Qixiang in Fuzhou, advanced urban renewal initiatives, and effectively addressed the issue of poverty alleviation on Pingtan Island.

He served as Governor of Fujian from 1999 to 2002, during which he presented the notion of "Megalopolises" and advocated for the inter-island growth strategy of Fuzhou and Xiamen, which motivated local officials to swiftly overcome the repercussions of the Yuanhua smuggling case (Chinese: 远华走私案) and adopt a new development strategy. After becoming the acting governor, Xi led a research group to produce twenty-seven reports on agricultural modernization, which subsequently were published in a book edited by him in February 2001. In December 2001, Xi published his doctoral dissertation titled "A Study on China’s Agricultural Marketization". Xi said that as Fujian's rural population consisted around 80 percent of the total population, the agricultural modernization had to contend with issues including weak superstructure, slow urbanization, low incomes and large surplus labor. Xi focused on goals such as marketization, commodification, science and technology, rural industries, and sustained development, aiming to focus on pilot projects until 2005, agricultural modernization in more advanced areas by 2010, and full modernization by 2030. Xi aimed to reduce local government officials by 50 percent to raise efficiency and loosen regulations on foreign investment. Xi proposed the regional economic plan, including integrating the less developed mountainous and booming coastal areas to narrow the wealth gap. He also proposed a "south China free trade zone" including Hong Kong, as well as further opening Fujian's economy. He also proposed turning Fujian into an "ecological province". Xi investigated the "Jinjiang model"; the city had an increasing number of village and township enterprises that attracted largely overseas Chinese investment. In speeches, Xi commended them for having overcome the "constrictions of an ossified planned economy." Xi also oversaw the development of "Digital Fujian", including the province's complaint hotline into the "12345 Citizen Service Platform", so enhancing organizational efficiency. Xi made attempts to increase food safety, stating the problem was "too horrendous to behold". In 2001. Xi launched a campaign to devote three years to "basically" ensure food safety, eliminate food poisoning, in the cities, and for the entire province in five years. In the 1999 Taiwan Strait Crisis, Xi participated in the military planning. In 2000, following Fujian Provincial Party Standing Committee convening a military affairs meeting to discuss defense mobilization, Xi was put in charge of specific planning. Xi also stressed ties between Taiwan and mainland China by saying "Don’t let political differences interfere with the economic cooperation across the strait", stressing everything could be discussed as long as one China was adhered to. Xi supported the Three Links policy with Taiwan, and in July 2002, he announced that preparation for implementation of the policy was complete.

=== Zhejiang ===
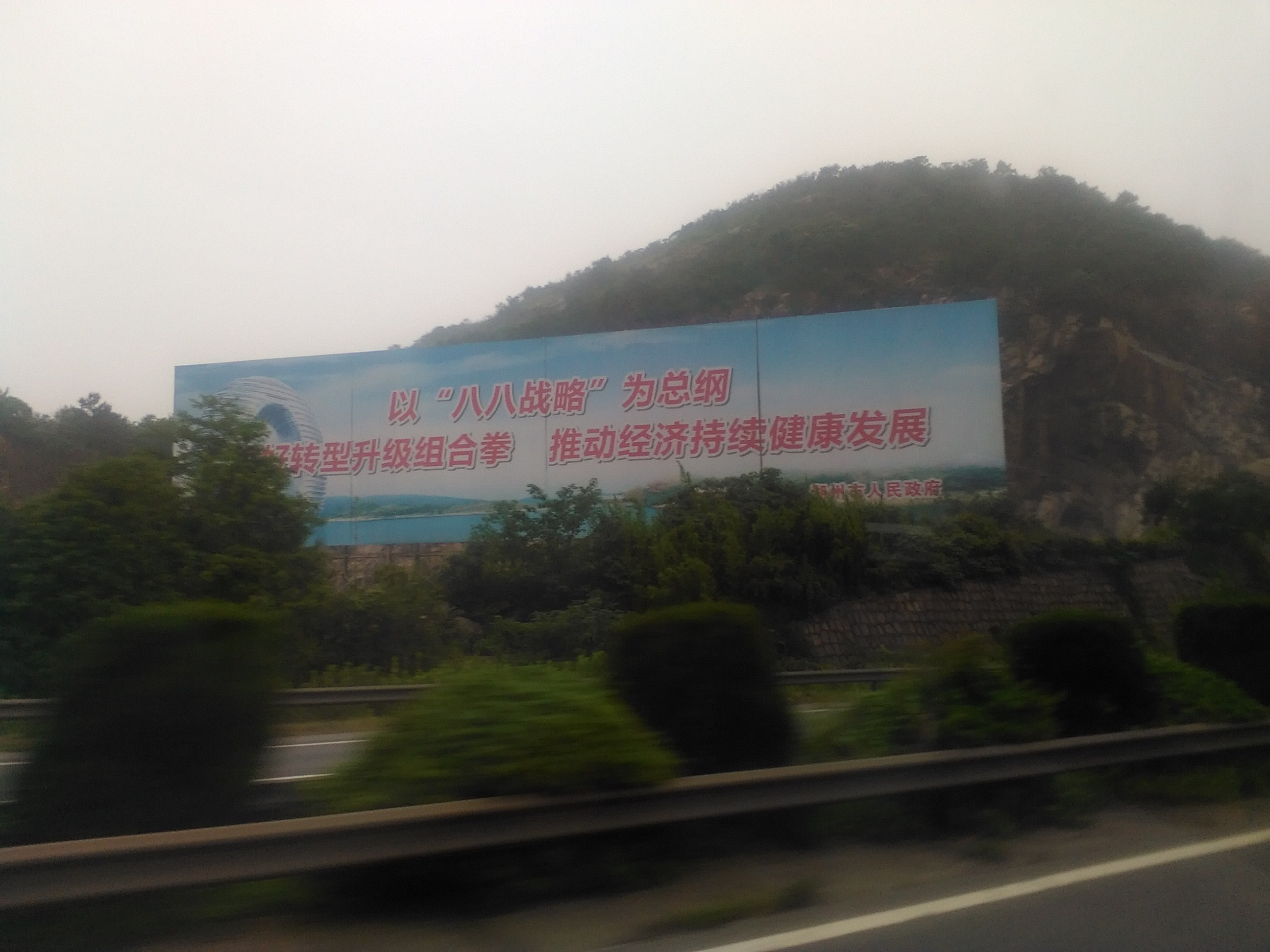
Double Eight Strategy displayed along the side of a road in Zhejiang Province .The Double Eight Strategy was a guiding program for work proposed by Xi Jinping during his time working in Zhejiang.

In October 2002, Xi left Fujian and took up leading political positions in neighbouring Zhejiang. He eventually took over as provincial Party Committee secretary after several months as acting governor, occupying a top provincial office for the first time in his career. In November 2002, he was elected a full member of the 16th Central Committee by the 16th Party National Congress, marking his ascension to the national stage. Between 2004 and 2007, Li Qiang acted as Xi's chief of staff through his position as secretary-general of the Zhejiang Party Committee, where they developed close mutual ties. While in Zhejiang, Xi presided over reported growth rates averaging 14% per year. He visited every county to understand the local conditions. At an economic work conference in December 2004, Xi blamed economic problems on the "rough and ready" style of economic development which was high energy consumption, low efficiency, and low-tech production. Following the conference, measures were devised in 2005 to begin an overall transformation for 11 key sectors.

Xi advocated that the government should reduce its administrative interference but also take a more active role in promoting economic growth. By 2006, he reduced the items subjected to administrative approval system from 3,251 to 856. In January 2003 Xi proposed the five "hundred billion" projects for the 2005–2009 period, which included ¥100 billion yuan each in the economy, informationization, science, education, health, and sports, ecological environment, and poverty alleviation. This included around 20 projects, with at least ¥10 billion yuan invested annually for each project, totaling around ¥3 trillion. During this period, Xi and Li drafted the Double Eight Strategy, which listed eight comparative advantages of Zhejiang and eight corresponding actions to improve the province. Xi proposed that Zhejiang, Jiangsu and Shanghai jointly develop the Yangtze Delta region by each drawing on their own strengths. Xi agreed to let Shanghai run the Yangshan Port, allowing the project to continue. He promoted the integration of Ningbo, Zhoushan, and islands on the Zhoushan archipelago. He also promoted the Hangzhou Bay Bridge. Xi also proposed that, given Zhejiang's economic development, ecological protection should be given priority, and tied the issue with decreasing the gap between rural and urban areas. In 2004, the Zhejiang government published a plan declaring a three-year war against environmental pollution. In 2005, Xi unveiled a recycling economy initiative to reduce, reuse, and decontaminate.

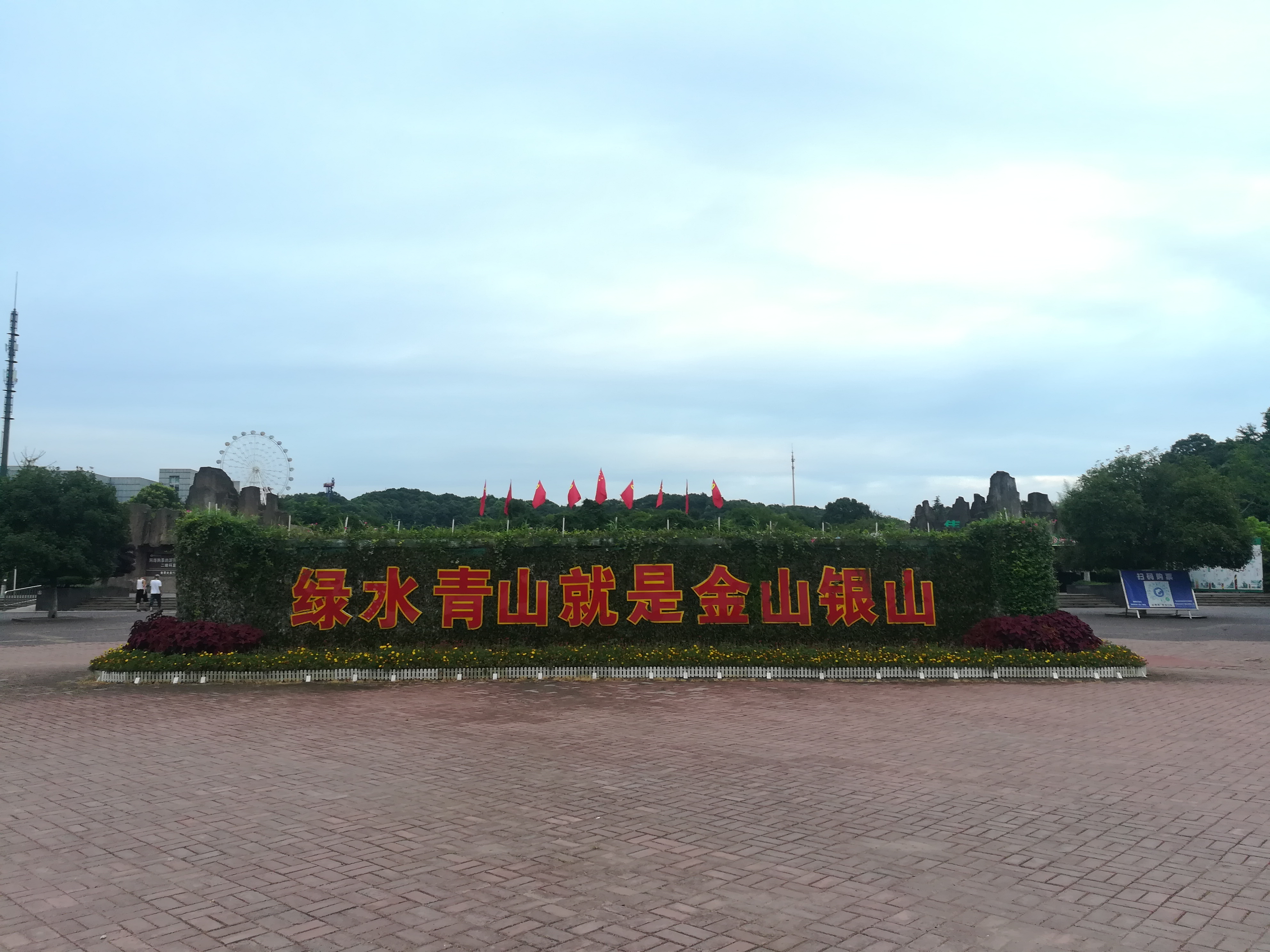
The slogan "Lucid waters and lush mountains are invaluable assets" originated from Xi Jinping's environmental advocacy during his work in Zhejiang, and later became an important part of Xi Jinping Thought on Ecological Civilization

In 2003, Xi became the first provincial leade to regularly go down to the grassroots to receive petitioners. He promoted the "Fengqiao experience" to officially contain and resolve conflicts at the grassroots level without needing to involve higher legal bodies. Xi promoted private enterprise, calling them the "precious treasure" of Zhejiang. He also supported greater protection of private property. He increased research and development investment yuan from ¥5.6 billion yuan to ¥31.6 billion yuan in 2003. Under Xi, the number of large private companies had risen from 183 to 203 by the time he left. In 2005 and 2006, he participated and gave speeches at the Zhejiang Directors Association and Zhejiang Enterprise Confederation conferences. Xi visited several private enterprises, including Geely, which he gave state support to. He also gave early support to Jack Ma and Alibaba Group. Under Xi, an increasing number of entrepreneurs joined the Zhejiang Provincial People's Congress. During this period, Zhejiang increasingly transitioned away from heavy industry.

In 2005, Xi encouraged the "Jump out of Zhejiang' policy, encouraging entrepreneurs to invest outside of Zhejiang. Starting from 2004, in line with central government policies, Xi started promoting slogans such as "Safe Zhejiang", "Rule of Law Zhejiang" and "Harmonious Zhejiang". Xi and the provincial leadership spent more than 70 percent of the budget to "people’s livelihood" and pledge various quality of life measures. Xi also oversaw policies regarding the "floating population" by easing hukou restrictions for rural migrant workers. Xi met with Kuomintang leader Lien Chan when he visited mainland China. In 2004, after Houchen village established a "village affairs supervisory committee" to supervise the village government and to open up village affairs, Xi gave his approval, leading to their spread. In 2005, Xi endorsed an election model in Tangjiadai village where anyone could nominate themselves instead of requiring a previous nomination procedure. The Zhejiang government also pioneered attempts to increase rural development, including by building "one thousand demonstration villages and fix up ten thousand villages" project in 2003. Xi's career in Zhejiang was marked by a tough and straightforward stance against corrupt officials. This earned him a name in the national media and drew the attention of China's top leaders.

=== Shanghai ===
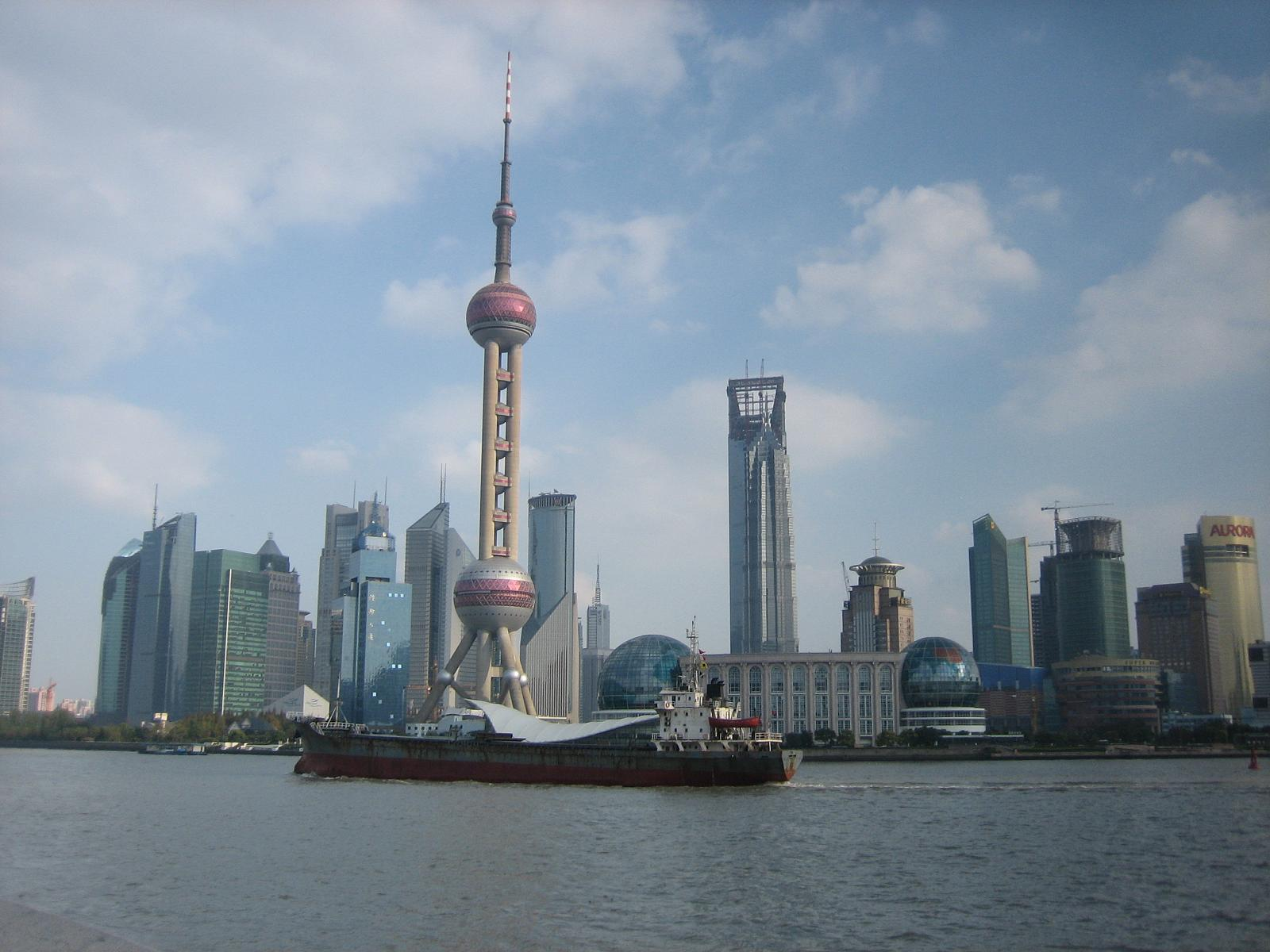
Shanghai in 2007. Xi was appointed the city's Party Secretary following the dismissal of Chen Liangyu due to a social security fund scandal

Following the dismissal of Shanghai Party secretary Chen Liangyu in September 2006 due to a social security fund scandal, Xi was transferred to Shanghai on 24 March 2007, where he was the party secretary there for seven months. On 30 March, Xi visited the historic sites of the first and second CCP National Congresses, visiting Pudong the following day. In April, Xi undertook research tours that were focused on livelihood issues such as employment, healthcare, education, and housing. While in Shanghai, he worked on preserving unity of the local party organisation. He pledged there would be no 'purges' during his administration, despite the fact many local officials were thought to have been implicated in the Chen Liangyu corruption scandal. In Shanghai, Xi avoided controversy and was known for strictly observing party discipline. For example, Shanghai administrators attempted to earn favour with him by arranging a special train to shuttle him between Shanghai and Hangzhou for him to complete handing off his work to his successor as Zhejiang party secretary Zhao Hongzhu. However, Xi reportedly refused to take the train, citing a loosely enforced party regulation that stipulated that special trains can only be reserved for "national leaders". Xi also refused a three-story high British-style mansion at Xiangyang Road that measured 800 square meters that was given to him. On most issues, Xi largely echoed the line of the central leadership. He developed a reputation in his early career for avoiding controversy and not making political opponents.

=== Politburo Standing Committee ===
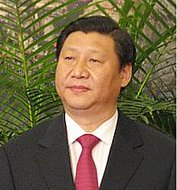
In October 2007, Xi Jinping, who had just been elected as a member of the Politburo Standing Committee, held a press conference.

Immediately after the 17th Party Congress, Xi was elected by the first plenary session of the 17th Central Committee to be the 6th-ranking member of the Politburo Standing Committee on 22 October 2007. In addition, Xi became a member of the 17th Secretariat. He also led the Central Leading Group for Party Building and the Central Hong Kong and Macau Affairs Leading Group, as well as being the deputy leader of the Central Foreign Affairs Leading Group. He was ranked above Li Keqiang in the PSC, an indication that he was going to succeed Hu Jintao as China's next leader. This assessment was further supported at the first session of the 11th National People's Congress in March 2008, when Xi was elected as vice president of China. Following his elevation, Xi held a broad range of portfolios. He was put in charge of the comprehensive preparations for the 2008 Summer Olympics in Beijing, as well as being the central government's leading figure in Hong Kong and Macau affairs. In addition, he also became the president of the Central Party School, the CCP's cadre-training and ideological education school.

In the wake of the 2008 Sichuan earthquake, Xi visited disaster areas in Shaanxi and Gansu. In 6–8 July 2008, he visited Hong Kong, where he met with middle-class and grassroots families. At the 87th anniversary of the Chinese Communist Party on 30 June 2008, Xi delivered a keynote speech. After the Olympics, Xi was assigned the post of committee chair for the preparations of celebrations for the 60th anniversary of the People's Republic of China. He was also reportedly at the helm of a top-level CCP committee dubbed the 6521 Project, which was charged with ensuring social stability during a series of politically sensitive anniversaries in 2009; namely referencing to the 60th anniversary of the founding of the People's Republic of China, the 50th anniversary of the 1959 Tibetan uprising, the 20th anniversary of the 1989 Tiananmen Square protests and massacre, and the 10th anniversary of the persecution of Falun Gong. in September 2008, Xi led an 18-month campaign to study the Scientific Outlook on Development of Hu Jintao. In the same month, he gave a speech at the Central Party School, where he said that the CCP's problem was that, since assuming power in 1949, it had not abandoned the role of a "revolutionary party" and that the confusion regarding the different roles of a revolutionary party and a ruling party had created conflict and would have a serious impact if not solved. In March 2009, Xi was assigned as head of a drafting committee to draft major document on party-building that was approved by the fourth plenary session of the 17th Central Committee in September 2009. Xi gave the keynote speech at a forum on the CCP's 88th anniversary on 30 June 2009.

Xi was sent to Xinjiang from 17 to 21 July 2009, where conducted investigations of local communities, enterprises, schools, and oil and chemical projects. Following the July 2009 Ürümqi riots, Xi was put in charge to restore order, aided by Zhou Yongkang. In January 2010, Xi sent a personal cell-phone greeting to one million grassroots-level party branch secretaries and village chiefs on behalf of the Central Committee, saying "On behalf of the Central Committee of the Party, I am extending my cordial greetings to the nationwide grassroots party secretaries and college graduate village officials". On 7 March 2010. at a talk with a Hong Kong delegation, Xi said that as a unitary state, the autonomy enjoyed by Hong Kong was not inherent, and encouraged reform of the Hong Kong's political system. In April 2010, Xi visited Ürümqi for a second time, where he announced Xinjiang party secretary Wang Lequan would be reassigned as deputy secretary of the Central Political and Legal Affairs Commission. On 18 October 2010, at the fifth plenary session of the 17th Central Committee, Xi was elected to be a vice chairman of the CCP Central Military Commission, followed by his appointment as vice chairman of the state CMC on 28 October by the Standing Committee of the National People's Congress. On 23 February 2011, Xi delivered the concluding speech at a symposium about innovative social governance. In 2011, Xi was attended an event commemorating the 60th anniversary of the "Peaceful Liberation of Tibet" as the head of a 59-member delegation representing the central government. At the speech on 19 July 2011, Xi vowed to crack down on separatist activities by the Dalai Lama “clique" and “completely destroy any attempt to undermine stability in Tibet and the national unity of the motherland."

Xi's position as the apparent successor to become the paramount leader was threatened with the rapid rise of Bo Xilai, the party secretary of Chongqing at the time. Bo was expected to join the PSC after the 18th Party Congress, with most expecting that he would try to eventually maneuver himself into replacing Xi. Bo's policies in Chongqing inspired imitations throughout China and received praise from Xi himself during Xi's visit to Chongqing in 2010. Records of praises from Xi were later erased after he became paramount leader. Bo's downfall would come with the Wang Lijun incident, which opened the door for Xi to come to power without challengers.

==== Diplomacy ====
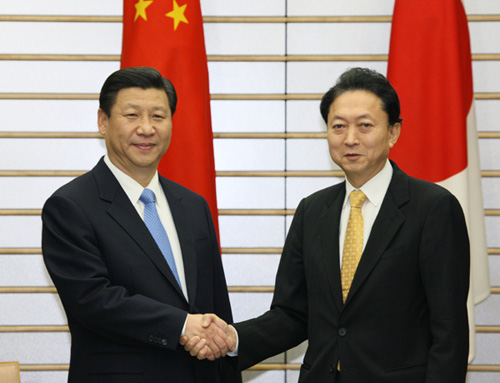
In December 2009, Xi Jinping met with Japanese Prime Minister Yukio Hatoyama in Tokyo.

Xi made his first foreign trip as vice president to North Korea, Mongolia, Saudi Arabia, Qatar and Yemen from 17 to 25 June 2008. In February 2009, in his capacity as vice president, Xi embarked on a tour of Latin America, visiting Mexico, Jamaica, Colombia, Venezuela, Brazil, and Malta, after which he returned to China. On 11 February 2009, while visiting Mexico, Xi spoke in front of a group of overseas Chinese and explained China's contributions during the international financial crisis, saying that it was "the greatest contribution towards the whole of human race, made by China, to prevent its 1.37 billion people from hunger." (Note: Original simplified Chinese: 在国际金融风暴中, 中国能基本解决13亿人口吃饭的问题, 已经是对全人类最伟大的贡献; traditional Chinese: 在國際金融風暴中, 中國能基本解決13億人口吃飯的問題, 已經是對全人類最偉大的貢獻) He went on to remark: "There are some bored foreigners, with full stomachs, who have nothing better to do than point fingers at us. First, China doesn't export revolution; second, China doesn't export hunger and poverty; third, China doesn't come and cause you headaches. What more is there to be said?" (Note: Original: simplified Chinese: 有些吃饱没事干的外国人, 对我们的事情指手画脚.中国一不输出革命, 二不输出饥饿和贫困, 三不折腾你们, 还有什么好说的?; traditional Chinese: 有些吃飽沒事干的外國人, 對我們的事情指手畫腳.中國一不輸出革命, 二不輸出飢餓和貧困, 三不折騰你們, 還有什麽好說的?) The story was reported on some local television stations. The news led to a flood of discussions on Chinese Internet forums and it was reported that the Chinese Ministry of Foreign Affairs was caught off-guard by Xi's remarks, as the actual video was shot by some accompanying Hong Kong reporters and broadcast on Hong Kong TV, which then turned up on various Internet video websites. In the European Union, Xi visited Belgium, Germany, Bulgaria, Hungary and Romania from 7 to 21 October 2009. He visited Japan, South Korea, Cambodia, and Myanmar on his Asian trip from 14 to 22 December 2009. He later visited the United States, Ireland and Turkey in February 2012. This visit included meeting with then U.S. president Barack Obama at the White House and vice president Joe Biden (with Biden as the official host); and stops in California and Iowa. In Iowa, he met with the family that previously hosted him during his 1985 tour as a Hebei provincial official.

==== Accession to top posts ====
A few months before his ascendancy to the party leadership, Xi disappeared from official media coverage and cancelled meetings with foreign officials for several weeks beginning on 1 September 2012, causing rumors. He then reappeared on 15 September. On 15 November 2012, immediately after the 18th Party National Congress, Xi was elected by the first plenary session the 18th Central Committee to the posts of Party general secretary and chairman of the Party CMC. This made him, formally the CCP leader, and informally, the paramount leader and also the first to be born after the founding of the PRC. The following day Xi led the new line-up of the PSC onto the stage in their first public appearance. The membership of the PSC was reduced from nine to seven, with Xi and Li Keqiang retaining their seats; the other five members were new.

In a marked departure from the common practice of Chinese leaders, Xi's first speech as general secretary was plainly worded and did not include any political slogans or mention his predecessors. Xi mentioned the aspirations of the average person, remarking, "Our people ... expect better education, more stable jobs, better income, more reliable social security, medical care of a higher standard, more comfortable living conditions, and a more beautiful environment." Xi also vowed to tackle corruption at the highest levels, alluding that it would threaten the CCP's survival; he was reticent about far-reaching economic reforms.

In December 2012, Xi visited Guangdong in his first trip outside Beijing since taking the general secretaryship. The overarching theme of the trip was to call for further economic reform and a strengthened military. Xi visited the statue of Deng Xiaoping and his trip was described as following in the footsteps of Deng's own southern trip in 1992, which provided the impetus for further economic reforms in China. Xi's trip was significant in that he departed from the established convention of Chinese leaders' travel routines in multiple ways. Rather than dining out, Xi and his entourage ate regular hotel buffet. He travelled in a large van with his colleagues rather than a fleet of limousines, and did not restrict traffic on the parts of the highway he travelled.

Xi was elected president on 14 March 2013, in a confirmation vote during the first session of the 12th National People's Congress in Beijing. He received 2,952 for, one vote against, and three abstentions. He replaced Hu Jintao, who retired after serving two terms. Xi was also elected as the chairman of the state CMC. He subsequently nominated Li Keqiang to be the premier, who was then appointed by the NPC.
