= List of domestic trips made by Xi Jinping (2012–2017) =

This is a list of domestic trips made by Xi Jinping from 2012 to 2017, when he was elected as general secretary of the Chinese Communist Party.

== Summary ==
This list excludes trips made within Beijing, the capital of China in which the Zhongnanhai, the principal workplace of Xi, is located. Here are the number of visits per state or territory he traveled to:

- One: Anhui, Chongqing, Gansu. Guangxi, Guangdong, Guizhou, Hainan, Heilongjiang, Hong Kong, Hubei, Hunan, Inner Mongolia, Jiangxi, Jilin, Liaoning, Macau, Ningxia, Qinghai, Shaanxi, Shandong, Shanghai, Shanxi, Sichuan, Tianjin, Xinjiang, Yunnan
- Two: Henan, Jiangsu
- Three: Fujian, Zhejiang
- Four: Hebei

International

- See List of international trips made by Xi Jinping

A map of China highlighting places visited by Xi Jinping during his first term. One visit Two visits Three visits Four visits Beijing

== 2012 ==
Region	Areas visited	Dates	Details
Guangdong	Shenzhen, Zhuhai, Shunde, Guangzhou, Huizhou	7–11 December	First visit outside Beijing after the 18th National Congress of the Chinese Communist Party. See Xi Jinping's southern tour.
Hebei	Fuping	29–30 December	Visited impoverished residents in Fuping County.

== 2013 ==
Region	Areas visited	Dates	Details
Gansu	Linxia, Lanzhou	2–4 February	Visited the Yuangudui Village in Weiyuan County, Bulenggou Village in Dongxiang Autonomous County, the construction site of the Weiyuan County Water Diversion Project, the county seat of Dongxiang Autonomous County, Xihu Street in Qilihe District, Lanzhou City, Wuquan Vegetable Market in Chengguan District, and Jinchuan Group. Also listened to work reports from the Gansu Provincial Party Committee and the Provincial Government.
Hainan	Qionghai, Sanya	8–10 April	Xi Jinping listened to work reports from the Hainan Provincial Party Committee and the Provincial Government.
Tianjin		14–15 May	Xi held a discussion with representatives of college graduates, unemployed individuals, and surplus rural labor at the Tianjin Vocational Skills Public Training Center.
Sichuan	Lushan	21–23 May	Xi inspected earthquake-hit areas.
Hebei	Zhengding, Xibaipo, Shijiazhuang	11–12 July	Xi visited as part of the Party's Mass Line Education and Practice Activities.
Hubei	Wuhan, Ezhou	21–23 July	Xi listened to work reports from the Hubei Provincial Party Committee and the Provincial Government.
Liaoning	Dalian, Shenyang	28–31 August	Visited on the eve of the opening ceremony of the 12th National Games.
Hunan	Xiangxi, Jishou, Changsha	3–5 November	Research trip.
Shandong	Qingdao, Linyi, Jining, Heze, Jinan	24–28 November	Research trip.

== 2014 ==
Region	Areas visited	Dates	Details
Inner Mongolia	Hinggan, Xilingol, Hohhot	27–29 January	Visited on the eve of the Chinese New Year.
Henan	Lankao	17–18 March	Xi visited as part of the Party's Mass Line Education and Practice Activities.
Xinjiang	Kashgar, Ürümqi	27–30 April	Inspection trip.
Henan	Kaifeng, Zhengzhou	9–10 May	Inspection trip.
Shanghai		23–24 May	Inspection trip.
Fujian	Fuzhou	30 July – 1 August	Inspected troops.
Jiangsu	Nanjing	15 August	Visited on the eve of the 2nd Summer Youth Olympic Games.
Fujian	Pingtan, Fuzhou	1–2 November	Inspection trip.
Jiangsu	Nanjing, Zhenjiang	13–14 December	Inspection trip.
Macau		20 December	Anniversary visit.

== 2015 ==
Region	Areas visited	Dates	Details
Yunnan	Zhaotong, Dali, Kunming	19–21 January	Inspection visit.
Shaanxi	Yan'an, Tongchuan, Xi'an	13–16 February	Visited on the eve of the Chinese New Year.
Zhejiang	Zhoushan, Hangzhou	25–27 May	Inspection visit.
Guizhou	Zunyi, Guiyang, Gui'an	16–18 June	Inspection visit.
Jilin	Yanbian, Changchun	16–18 July	Inspection visit.
Zhejiang	Wuzhen	16 December	Visited the Light of the Internet Expo.

== 2016 ==
Region	Areas visited	Dates	Details
Chongqing		4–5 January	Inspection visit.
Jiangxi	Ji'an, Jinggangshan, Nanchang	1–3 February	Visited on the eve of the Chinese New Year.
Anhui	Lu'an, Chuzhou, Hefei	24–27 April	Research trip.
Heilongjiang	Yichun, Fuyuan, Jiamusi, Harbin	23–25 May	Inspection visit.
Ningxia	Guyuan, Yinchuan	18–20 July	Inspection visit.
Hebei	Tangshan	28 July	Commemorating the 1976 Tangshan earthquake.
Qinghai	Haixi, Haidong, Xining	22–22 August	Inspection visit.
Zhejiang	Hangzhou	4–5 September	2016 G20 Hangzhou summit

== 2017 ==
Region	Areas visited	Dates	Details
Hebei	Zhangjiakou	24 January	Visited on the eve of the Chinese New Year.
Guangxi	Beihai, Nanning	19–21 April	Inspection visit.
Shanxi	Lüliang, Xinzhou, Taiyuan	21–23 June	Inspection visit.
Hong Kong		29 June – 1 July	See 2017 visit by Xi Jinping to Hong Kong
Fujian	Xiamen	3 September	9th BRICS summit
