= Four Malfeasances =

Chinese Communist Party slogan

The "Four Malfeasances" problem (Chinese: “四风”问题; pinyin: “Sì fēng” wèntí) is a term used by the Chinese Communist Party (CCP) first proposed by general secretary Xi Jinping in June 2013.

== History ==
The term Four Malfeasances was coined by General Secretary Xi Jinping at a work conference on the Party's Mass Line Education and Practice Activities held in Beijing on June 18, 2013. Xi Jinping said that the Four Malfeasances violate the nature and purpose of the CCP, are the issues that the masses hate the most and have the strongest reactions to, and are also an important source of damage to the relationship between the CCP, the masses, cadres and the masses. The term was mentioned by Xi during the 19th Party National Congress in October 2017.

== Concept ==
The Four Malfeasances refer to:

1. Formalism
2. Bureaucracy
3. Hedonism
4. Extravagance
