= Mishu =

Confidential secretary in China

A confidential secretary or Mishu (Chinese: 机要秘书, pronounced [tɕíjâʊ mîʂú]) in Chinese politics is a personal secretary often trusted with secret, private information. Chinese Communist Party (CCP) leaders, as well as other political and military leaders are often assigned confidential secretaries, who are in charge of processing secret documents and telegrams, as well as translation and record-keeping.

Chinese political leaders often have multiple secretaries. For example, during the Republic of China era, leaders such as Sun Yat-sen and Chiang Kai-shek employed "confidential secretaries" and "attendant secretaries" (侍从秘书) in addition to the official secretarial staff attached to their office. When Mao Zedong ceased to hold a government post, he still retained various secretaries including a "confidential secretary" and a "personal secretary" (生活秘书).

Jiyao mishu is sometimes shortened to "mishu", especially in Western works, but the latter term simply means "secretary" in Chinese and can mean any of a whole range of different positions from an administrative assistant in a small business to a policy advisor to the paramount leader (政治秘书, political secretary).

Xi Jinping was Geng Biao's mishu after graduating from Tsinghua University in 1979.

== See also ==
- Cadre system of the Chinese Communist Party
