= Double Eight Strategy =

Provincial development plan in Zhejiang

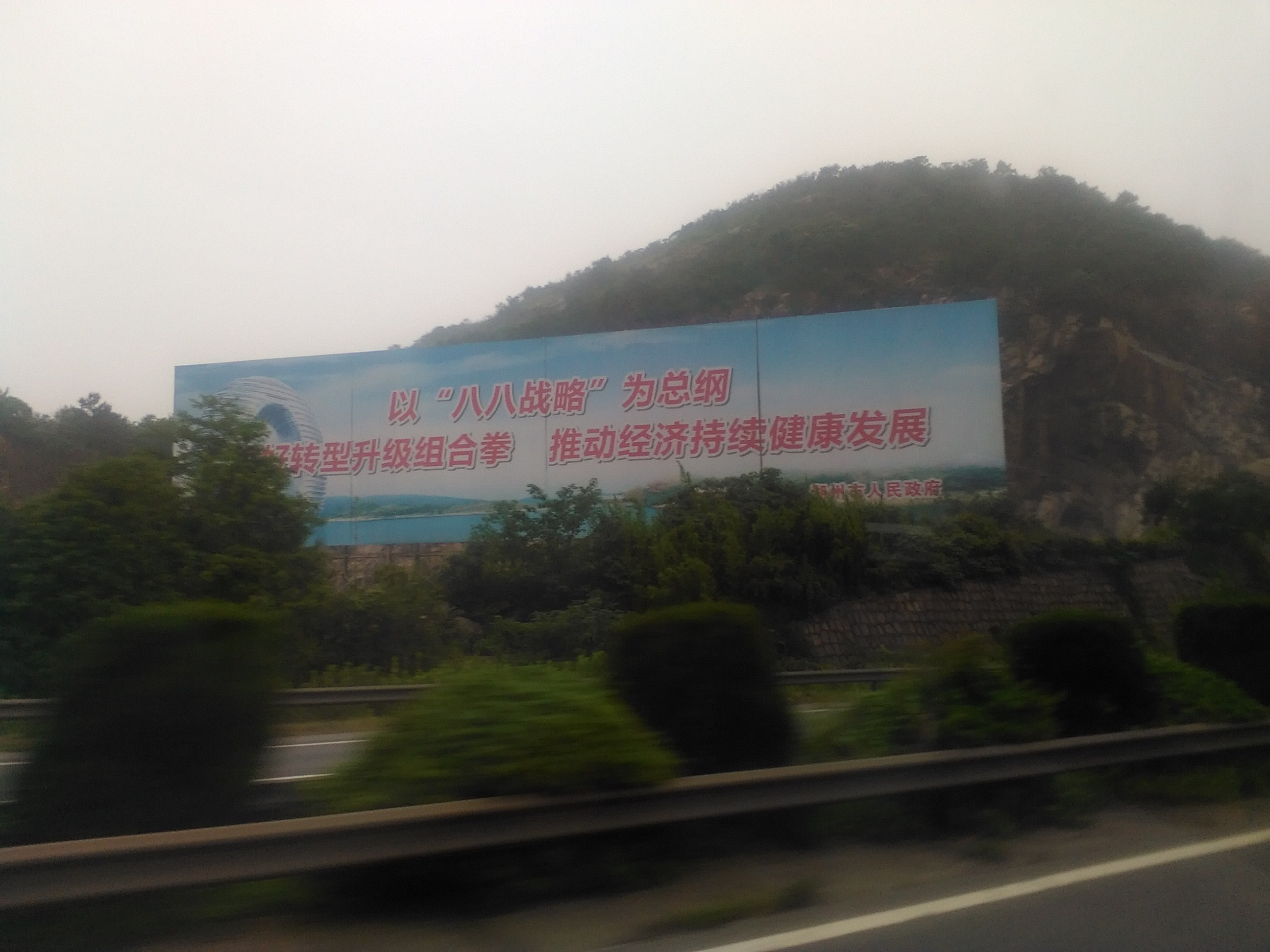
The "Double Eight Strategy" slogan on the Ninghang (Huzhou) section of the Changshen Expressway

The Double Eight Strategy is a set of eight measures for future development proposed by Xi Jinping, General Secretary of the Chinese Communist Party, when he was the Party Secretary of Zhejiang. It was proposed at the Fourth Plenary Session (Enlarged) of the 11th CCP Zhejiang Provincial Committee in July 2003. The eight measures are to further leverage Zhejiang Province's eight advantages and promote eight measures.

== Background ==
After the reform and opening up, Zhejiang Province, located in the eastern coastal area, has experienced rapid economic and social development. However, Zhejiang's fundamental resources were still in short supply, its internal quality was insufficient, and its development model was considered to be extensive and has failed to keep pace with the international community, and had been unable to take the lead in development. High resource consumption, scattered industries, and institutional and quality bottlenecks have become prominent. The rapid development was mainly in the block economy, that is, concentrated and large-scale low-tech industries, such as the sock manufacturing industry. Datang Town in Zhuji City, with a population of only 30,000, can produce 7 billion pairs of socks a year, and there are more than 600 such towns in the province. However, with such resources, it was difficult to integrate them within the province and it is unable to effectively exert its advantages.

Moreover, in the early years of the 21st century, Zhejiang was also facing profound changes in the international and domestic macroeconomic development environment, as well as the dual pressures of increasingly fierce market competition and weakening of its own competitive advantages. Such a low-level and extensive industrial level will be a major bottleneck for Zhejiang's development. As the process of modernization and urbanization accelerates, Zhejiang also needs to resolve the contradiction between economic development and environmental protection, and change the trend of widening urban-rural gap. However, Zhejiang has also developed some unique and distinctive advantages in the practice of reform and opening up. Zhejiang is located in the Yangtze River Delta region, close to the ocean, with relatively developed transportation and economic cooperation, and it also has the momentum of economic innovation and development. Similar to the sock factory of Datang, the output wsa not small, but the method needs to be improved. At that time, the Central Committee of the Chinese Communist Party also made a judgment that "the first twenty years of this century are in an important strategic opportunity period" for the whole of China. Zhejiang also needed to respond to this and also faced some challenges.

== Strategy ==
When Xi Jinping was in charge of Zhejiang, he introduced eight measures to leverage Zhejiang's advantages and promote eight aspects based on the background of Zhejiang's economic and cultural development. LiThese measures are called the "Double Eight Strategy", covering the economy, environmental protection, people's livelihood and humanities. Li Qiang, then secretary-general of Zhejiang Provincial Party Committee, has been credited with helping draft and clarify the Double Eight Strategy. According to the book "Working in the Real World and Leading the Way", the "Double Eight Strategy" mainly refers to:

First, we will further leverage Zhejiang's institutional and mechanism advantages, vigorously promote the common development of multiple ownership economies with public ownership as the main body, and continuously improve the socialist market economic system.

The second is to further leverage Zhejiang's geographical advantages, actively integrate with Shanghai, actively participate in cooperation and exchanges in the Yangtze River Delta region, and continuously improve the level of domestic and foreign opening up.

The third is to further leverage Zhejiang's advantages in block-shaped characteristic industries, accelerate the construction of advanced manufacturing bases, and take the road of new industrialization.

Fourth, further leverage Zhejiang's advantages in coordinated urban and rural development and accelerate the promotion of urban-rural integration.

Fifth, further leverage Zhejiang's ecological advantages, create an ecological province, and build a "Green Zhejiang".

Sixth, we will further leverage Zhejiang's advantages in mountain and sea resources, vigorously develop the marine economy, promote leapfrog development in underdeveloped areas, and strive to make the development of the marine economy and underdeveloped areas a new growth point for Zhejiang's economy.

Seventh, we will further leverage Zhejiang's environmental advantages, actively promote key construction with the "five 10 billion" projects as the main content, and effectively strengthen the rule of law, credit and government efficiency.

Eighth, we will further leverage Zhejiang's cultural advantages, actively promote the development of science, education and talent, and accelerate the construction of a cultural province.

The main content of the "Double Eight Strategy" was to first improve the socialist market economic system and reform it in accordance with the existing system and mechanism of Zhejiang's large number of private ownership, while still maintaining public ownership as the main body, but at the same time ensuring the continuous development of various private ownership economies. Then, Zhejiang 's regional advantage of being located in the Yangtze River Delta region will be further utilized to connect with Shanghai, and economic opening and cooperation will be carried out both internally and externally. Regarding the block-shaped economic industries in Zhejiang, Xi Jinping said that the construction of advanced manufacturing bases should be accelerated and the road of new industrialization should be taken.

Regarding the urban-rural gap in Zhejiang, Xi Jinping advocated the promotion of urban-rural integration and the promotion of coordinated urban-rural development, believing that it is advantageous under such circumstances. In terms of environmental protection, Zhejiang's original ecological advantages also need to be magnified, and on this basis, an ecological province should be created to build a green Zhejiang. He deployed the "Thousand Villages Demonstration, Ten Thousand Villages Remediation" project and launched an environmental pollution remediation campaign. During his tenure, Xi Jinping also proposed the "Green Water and Green Mountains are Gold and Silver Mountains" strategy that focuses on environmental protection when inspecting Anji, Zhejiang. At the same time, since Zhejiang is close to the sea, Xi Jinping also said that Zhejiang's mountain and sea resource advantages should be further utilized and the construction of the marine economy should be made a new growth point for Zhejiang's development. On people's livelihood issues, Xi Jinping said that we should actively promote infrastructure construction, strengthen the rule of law, credit and government efficiency. Finally, in the field of humanities, Xi Jinping said that we should continue to develop science and technology and talents, and accelerate the construction of Zhejiang into a cultural province.

== Result ==
After the reform of the block economy, 59 old industrial sites in Yuhuan City were renovated, and enterprises such as Supor and Aidisi were introduced; the profit of a pair of socks made by Datang's sock-making enterprises was only a little over 0.1 yuan, but in 2018, good brands could sell for hundreds of yuan. After the government focused on developing the environmental protection economy, ecological industries and rural tourism have now become the pillar industries in the mountainous areas of western Zhejiang, making Kaihua County's annual per capita income increase from less than 3,600 yuan to more than 30,000 yuan after 2018. After 15 years of implementation of the "Thousand Villages Demonstration, Ten Thousand Villages Renovation" project, it is said that 100% of the established villages in Zhejiang Province have achieved centralized collection and treatment of domestic waste.

== Analysis ==
Many contents of the Xi Jinping Thought on Economy originate from the Double Eight Strategy. Domestic media and officials in the People's Republic of China have given this strategy very positive comments. On July 18, 2018, the Communist Party newspaper People's Daily published two consecutive reports on the "Double Eight Strategy" on the front page, claiming that it has become the golden key to Zhejiang's development. It believes that the deeper and longer it is implemented, the more powerful its leading force will be. Commentators of the People's Daily said that it is necessary to write a new chapter of the "Double Eight Strategy" and believe that with the guidance of Xi Jinping Thought on Socialism with Chinese Characteristics for a New Era, "we will surely win the great victory of building a moderately prosperous society in all respects." In 2018, Che Jun, then Party Secretary of Zhejiang, mentioned the strategy six times. On July 10, the front page of Zhejiang Daily also published an article titled "Resolutely follow the path guided by the Double Eight Strategy". At the same time, it was mentioned on many occasions that the great value and truth power of General Secretary Xi Jinping's new ideas, new thoughts and new strategies for governing the country should be demonstrated in the new development.
