= Newland Digital Technology =

Chinese IT company

- Type: Public
- Industry: Point of sale, Payment terminals
- Founded: 1994; 32 years ago
- Headquarters: Fujian, China
- Website: dt.newland.com.cn

Newland Digital Technology Co., Ltd. (Chinese: 新大陆数字技术; pinyin: Xīndàlù shùzì jìshù), previously known as Fujian Newland Computer Co., Ltd., is an IT products and services provider headquartered in Fuzhou, Fujian, in China. It provides service and application products based on networking for markets in data identification, electronic financial payment, mobile communication support, expressway information systems, cloud computing and big data services.

== History ==
The company was founded in 1994 by Hu Gang. It was listed as a public company on the Shenzhen Stock Exchange in 2000 and became the first A-share listed company in Fujian Province in 2005. In 2010, the company released the world's first QR code (2D barcode) decoding chip. In 2016, Newland acquired Fujian Guotong Xingyi Network Technology Co., Ltd., the only company in Fujian Province that obtained a national bank card acquiring license. The company changed its name from Fujian Newland Computer Co., Ltd. to Newland Digital Technology Co. Ltd. in 2018.

== Subsidiaries ==
=== Newland Payment Technology (Newland NPT) ===
Founded in 1994, Newland NPT mainly manufactures payment terminals, PIN pads, and point of sale (POS) hardware and software. In 2016, it was ranked the third POS terminal supplier worldwide after Ingenico and Verifone. In 2017, the company overtook Verifone and became the second-largest POS terminal manufacturer in the world. In the same year, the company produced the world's first full-touch screen smart POS and it helped the company to receive in December, the "Red Star Award", the highest design award in China. In 2022, the company awarded the "National Industrial Design Center" at the 5th China International Industrial Design Expo held in Wuhan.

=== Newland AIDC ===
Established in 1999 as a subsidiary of Newland Digital Technology, Newland AIDC provides services in the Automatic Identification and Data Capture (AIDC) industry. It operates globally as one of the world's four largest manufacturers in the field.

=== Newland EMEA (Newland Europe) ===
Newland EMEA (Newland Europe BV) is a member company of Newland Auto-ID Tech and a subsidiary of Newland Digital Technology Co. Ltd. It was founded in 2009 in Culemborg, Netherlands.

=== Newland S&T Group ===
Newland S&T Group is a high-tech company that supplies digital TV comprehensive solutions & wireless communication equipment and services for environment protection.

=== Guotong Xingyi ===
A wholly owned unit under Newland Digital Technology, Guotong Xingyi is an integrated payment services provider for bank card settlement. Founded in 2010, it obtained its payment business license from the People's Bank of China (PBOC) in 2012.

== Awards ==
- 2018, iF Design Award of the International Forum Design for NPT's Intelligent POS System N850.
- 2019, Red Dot Design Award for NPT's Intelligent POS System N850.
