= 2017 visit by Xi Jinping to Hong Kong =

CCP general secretary Xi Jinping's visit in 2017

Visit of Xi Jinping to Hong Kong
- Date: 29 June–1 July 2017
- Venue: Hong Kong
- Organised by: Government of Hong Kong; Central Leading Group on Hong Kong and Macau Affairs

On 29 June–1 July 2017, Chinese Communist Party (CCP) general secretary and Chinese president Xi Jinping visited Hong Kong during the 20th anniversary of its handover to the People's Republic of China (PRC).

On June 25, 2017, China's official media Xinhua News Agency officially announced that Xi Jinping would visit the Hong Kong Special Administrative Region again as per tradition. This is his first visit to Hong Kong since he was elected CCP General Secretary at the 18th National Congress of the Chinese Communist Party in 2012 and became the top leader. It is also the second consecutive year that a member of the CCP Politburo Standing Committee visited Hong Kong, following the visit of Zhang Dejiang, Chairman of the Standing Committee of the National People's Congress, in 2016.

Xi Jinping and his wife Peng Liyuan arrived in Hong Kong at noon on June 29 and left on July 1 after the inauguration ceremony and oath-taking ceremony of the Hong Kong Government. The visit lasted for three days. During his stay in Hong Kong, Xi Jinping attended the celebration of the 20th anniversary of the return of Hong Kong to China, presided over the inauguration ceremony and oath-taking ceremony of the fifth government of the Hong Kong Special Administrative Region, reviewed the Chinese People's Liberation Army stationed in Hong Kong, and attended many official events.

== Visit ==
CCP general secretary Xi Jinping met with political and business leaders, including Li Ka-shing, chairman of Cheung Kong Hutchison Holdings, who shook hands for 13 seconds and had a conversation. Xi Jinping then took a group photo with more than 100 people present and delivered a speech, pointing out that the "one country, two systems" policy has achieved universally recognized success. He proposed four aspects to be done well: first, take the lead in supporting former Chief Executive Carrie Lam and the new SAR government; second, take the lead in building unity and maintaining harmony and stability; third, take the lead in caring for young people, helping them solve practical problems and creating good conditions for their growth and development; fourth, take the lead in promoting exchanges and cooperation between Hong Kong and the Mainland, giving full play to their respective expertise and promoting common development of the two places.
