= Xi Jinping's southern tour =

2012 trip by Xi Jinping

Xi Jinping's southern tour refers to the five-day trip to Guangdong and other places by Xi Jinping, the General Secretary of the Chinese Communist Party, after taking office in December 2012. During the trip, Xi repeatedly emphasized "vigorously promoting reform and adhering to opening up" and described reform and opening up as "the key move that determines China's fate". The route of Xi Jinping's Southern Tour was roughly the same as the Guangdong section of Deng Xiaoping's southern tour in January 1992. He was accompanied by Wang Yang, a Politburo member who is considered a reformist, and visited local veteran cadres from the time of Deng's Southern Tour. It was also called the "New Southern Tour" by the media.

Unlike his predecessor Hu Jintao, who chose Xibaipo, Hebei, the "command post" of the final stage of the Chinese Civil War, as his first destination after taking office as General Secretary in December 2002, Xi Jinping chose Shenzhen, Guangdong, a key area for reform and opening up, as his first stop, rather than Yan'an, the important revolutionary base of the CCP where he had spent six years; foreign media paid close attention to this. Xi Jinping's father, Xi Zhongxun, also served as the Party Secretary of Guangdong at the beginning of the reform and opening up.

On October 22, 2018, when the Hong Kong–Zhuhai–Macau Bridge opened, Xi Jinping visited Zhuhai, marking his second visit to Guangdong in six years.

== Schedule ==
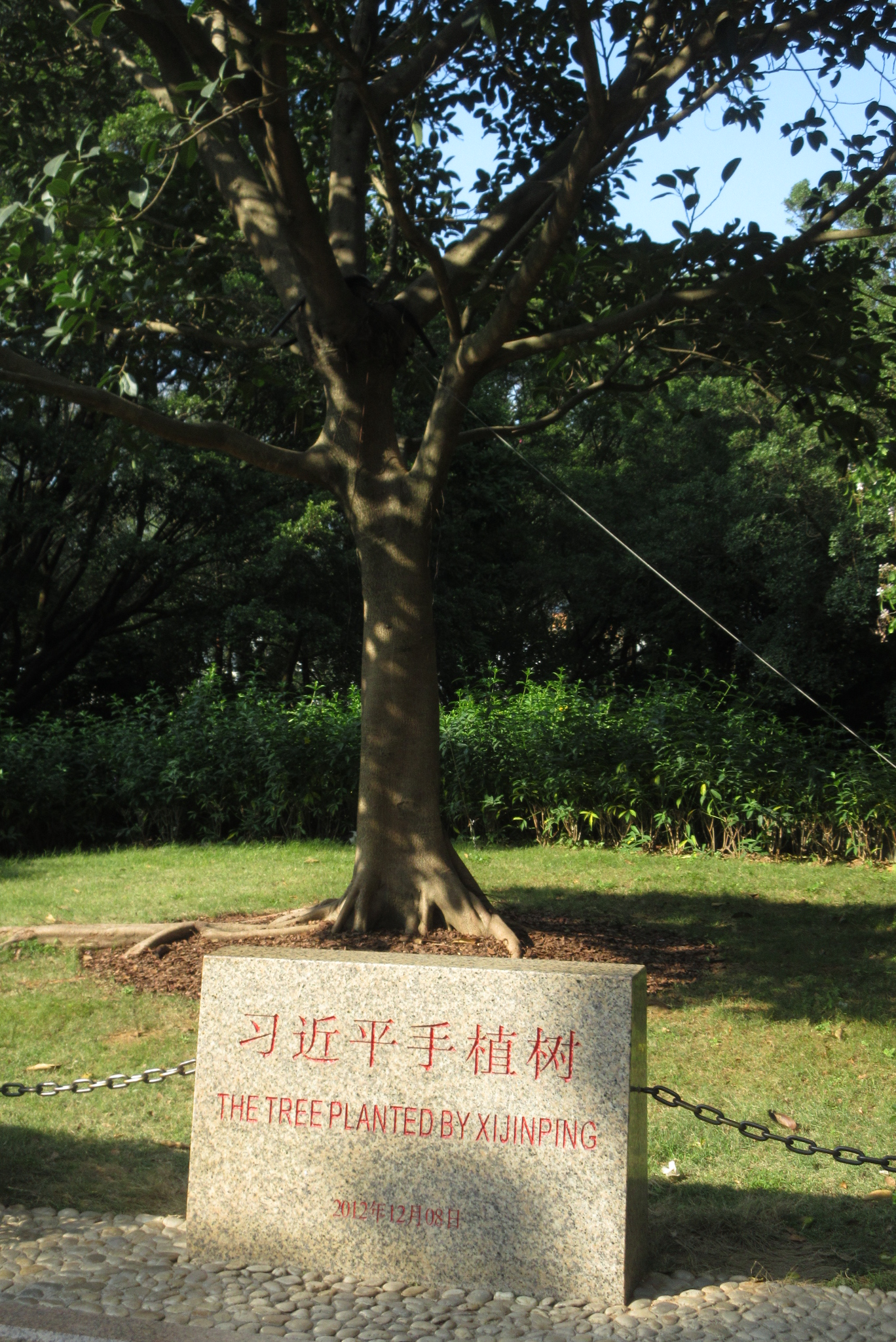
The banyan tree planted by Xi Jinping on Lianhua Mountain during his southern tour

This southern tour of Guangdong lasted 5 days, from 7 to 11 December, and included Shenzhen, Zhuhai, Shunde, Guangzhou, Huizhou and other places.

Date	Location	Schedule	Ref.
December 7–8	Shenzhen Special Economic Zone	Inspected the Qianhai Cooperation Zone and Tencent; Visited a fishing village to encourage villagers to remain steadfast in their commitment to reform and opening up.; Presented a flower basket to the bronze statue of Deng Xiaoping in Lianhuashan.; Visited his mother Qi Xin, who lives in Shenzhen	
December 8–9	Zhuhai Special Economic Zone	Inspected Hengqin Development Zone and listened to reports	
December 9	Shunde	Visited Shunde Guangdong Industrial Design City; Visited impoverished households in Huanglong Village	
December 9 afternoon	Guangzhou	Chaired an economic work symposium, emphasizing the need to enhance awareness of potential risks.	
December 10, morning	Huizhou	Inspected the local garrison of the Guangzhou Military Region in Huizhou; Inspected the Huizhou Zhongkai High-tech Zone	
December 11, morning	Guangzhou	Inspected the comprehensive management of the Donghaoyong River in Yuexiu District	

During his visit and meetings, Xi Jinping repeatedly emphasized the need to adhere to the correct direction of reform and opening up.

== Media reports ==
The overarching theme of the trip was to call for further economic reform and a strengthened military. Xi visited the statue of Deng Xiaoping and his trip was described as following in the footsteps of Deng's own southern trip in 1992, which provided the impetus for further economic reforms in China after conservative party leaders stalled many of Deng's reforms in the aftermath of the 1989 Tiananmen Square protests and massacre. On his trip, Xi consistently alluded to his signature slogan, the "Chinese Dream". "This dream can be said to be the dream of a strong nation. And for the military, it is a dream of a strong military," Xi told sailors. Xi's trip was significant in that he departed from the established convention of Chinese leaders' travel routines in multiple ways. Rather than dining out, Xi and his entourage ate regular hotel buffet. He travelled in a large van with his colleagues rather than a fleet of limousines, and did not restrict traffic on the parts of the highway he travelled.

During this southern tour, Chinese official media focused on promoting Xi Jinping's approachable image, such as eating with ordinary soldiers in the army, getting close to citizens in Guangzhou, and having only a few police cars escorting him without harassing the public. During and shortly after Xi Jinping's southern tour, mainland news websites such as Tencent News displayed reports about Chongqing, including the exoneration of Chongqing police, Wang Lijun's record during his time in Chongqing, and an interview with Wen Qiang's son, on their homepages.

Shortly before the start of the Southern Tour, a mysterious account called "Xi Fan Group" appeared on Weibo (opened on 21 November 2012, and closed on 11 February 2013, controlled by Zhang Hongming). It referred to Xi Jinping as "Ping Dada" and accurately predicted and recorded every step of the Southern Tour. It was always one step ahead of the official media of the CCP and even posted early photos of Xi Jinping and his family. Later, according to a report from Beijing forwarded by The Washington Post, the blogger of "Xi Fan Group" was an ordinary worker. Later, a woman was arrested for leaving a mocking message on the "Xi Fan Group" account on Weibo.

China News Service interviewed relevant experts in Beijing, who said that Xi's inspection of Guangdong this time was both symbolic and substantive, and its significance was no less than Deng Xiaoping's Southern Tour in 1992. The Xinhua News Agency reported on the trip for the first time on 12 December after the southern tour, saying that this was Xi Jinping's new declaration and mobilization order to the whole of China to deepen reform and opening up.

In mid-January 2013, the magazine "Blog World" published an article revealing the conversation between four veteran cadres from Guangdong who accompanied Xi Jinping on his southern tour. Liang Guangda repeatedly quoted Deng Xiaoping's conversation with him during his southern tour in 1992. He mentioned a sentence Deng Xiaoping said in 1992: "If China does not carry out reform and opening up, it will only have a dead end." Chen Kaizhi said: "Deng Xiaoping repeatedly told the leading cadres that 'whoever does not adhere to reform and opening up will not have a good end.' He also repeatedly told the masses that 'whoever does not adhere to reform and opening up, you must defeat them.' He also said to the opposition who attacked reform and opening up and attacked the special economic zones, 'They are all talking nonsense.'"
