= Party's Mass Line Education and Practice Activities =

Chinese Communist Party campaign

The Party's Mass Line Education and Practice Activities (Chinese: 党的群众路线教育实践活动; pinyin: Dǎng de qúnzhòng lùxiàn jiàoyù shíjiàn huódòng) was a campaign launched by the Chinese Communist Party (CCP) launched in 2013 under the leadership of CCP General Secretary Xi Jinping. Aiming CCP cadres to use mass line tactics, the campaign concluded in 2014.

== History ==
The campaign was launched by the CCP during a conference on 18 June 2013. The conference was followed by an ad hoc meeting of the Politburo from June 22 to June 25. In 2013, Xi initiated the first of his Party's Education Programs on Selected Themes, which addressed the mass line. This program sought to address four types of harmful behaviors by party cadres and to require cadres to conduct self-examination and self-criticism in front of their subordinates and to solicit criticism from their subordinates. He called on officials to "look in the mirror, straighten their attire, take a bath and seek remedies". In his own words, Xi has described the campaign in terms of "purification" of the CCP, often involving the elimination of "hedonism and extravagance", although the purification implied is sometimes extended metaphorically to issues such as "reducing air pollution". Each member of the Politburo Standing Committee was tasked with connecting with one province and one county in order to set examples on how to pursue the campaign; Xi volunteered to go to Hebei. He visited Zhengding, Pingshan, and Shijiajiang, where he called on officials there to study central documents and speeches; carry out criticism and self- criticism. After Hebei, Xi visited Lankao County in Henan to assess the damage of the "four winds" and revived a model espoused by an official named Jiao Yulu in the 1960s.

As part of this campaign, Xi Jinping declared that "All Party organs and members should be frugal and make determined efforts to oppose ostentation and reject hedonism", although the interpretation of what this means seems to have varied from one province to the next somewhat. Hebei province reportedly reduced public spending on official receptions by 24%, cancelled the order of 17,000 new cars, and punished 2,750 government officials. The Economist reported two specific examples of punishments under the new mass line: the suspended death sentence for corruption given to Liu Zhijun and charging the 17-year-old-son of a high-ranking military officer for an alleged connection to a gang rape. Perhaps 20,000 party officials were punished within the first year of the revival campaign. A new official website was launched, focusing on the mass line. On 8 October 2014, a summary meeting was held, where Xi gave a speech, concluding the campaign.

== See also ==
- List of campaigns of the Chinese Communist Party
- Ideology of the Chinese Communist Party
- Propaganda in China
