= Xiao Yaqing =

Chinese politician (born September 1959)

- 肖亚庆
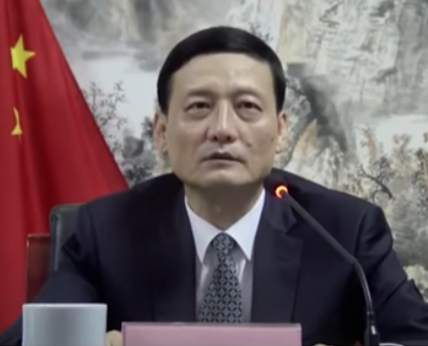
- Speaking at the 2021 World Economic Forum

Minister of Industry and Information Technology
- In office 11 August 2020 – 28 July 2022
- Premier: Li Keqiang
- Preceded by: Miao Wei
- Succeeded by: Jin Zhuanglong

Director of the State Administration for Market Regulation
- In office 17 May 2019 – 12 August 2021
- Premier: Li Keqiang
- Preceded by: Zhang Mao
- Succeeded by: Zhang Gong

Director of the State-owned Assets Supervision and Administration Commission
- In office 1 February 2016 – 17 May 2019
- Premier: Li Keqiang
- Preceded by: Zhang Yi
- Succeeded by: Hao Peng

General Manager of the Aluminum Corporation of China Limited
- In office 28 April 2004 – 17 February 2009
- Preceded by: Guo Shengkun
- Succeeded by: Xiong Weiping

Personal details
- Born: September 1959 (age 66) Xinle County, Hebei, China
- Party: Chinese Communist Party (1981–2022; expelled)
- Education: Central South University

Chinese name
- Simplified Chinese: 肖亚庆
- Traditional Chinese: 肖亞慶
Transcriptions
Standard Mandarin
- Hanyu Pinyin: Xiāo Yàqìng

Xiao Yaqing (born September 1959) is a former Chinese engineer, business executive and politician who served as Minister of Industry and Information Technology from 2020 to 2022. Previously he served as director of the State Administration for Market Regulation and State-owned Assets Supervision and Administration Commission. He was an alternate of the 17th Central Committee of the Chinese Communist Party and a member of the 18th Central Commission for Discipline Inspection of the Chinese Communist Party.

== Early life and education ==
Xiao was born in Xinle County, Hebei, in September 1959. He entered Central-South Institute of Mining and Metallurgy (now Central South University) in 1978, majoring in non ferrous metal pressure machining at the Metallic Materials Department, where he graduated in 1982.

== Executive career ==
Beginning in August 1982, he served in several posts at the Northeast Lightalloy Fabrication Plant (东北轻合金加工厂) in Harbin, including engineer, deputy chief engineer, chief engineer, and general manager.

In June 1999, he was transferred to Southwestern Aluminium Fabrication Plant (西南铝加工厂) in Chongqing, where he eventually promoted to December 2000. Under his management, the company turned losses into profits and ranked among China's top 500 enterprise groups.

In October 2003, he became deputy general manager of Aluminum Corporation of China Limited, rising to general manager the next year.

== Political career ==
In February 2009, he was appointed deputy secretary-general of the State Council, after this office was terminated in January 2016, he became director of the State-owned Assets Supervision and Administration Commission, serving until May 2019, when he was named director of the State Administration for Market Regulation. In July 2020, he was appointed party branch secretary of the Ministry of Industry and Information Technology, concurrently holding the minister position since August 2021.

== Investigation ==
On 28 July 2022, Xiao was put under investigation for suspected "violation of discipline and law" by the Central Commission for Discipline Inspection (CCDI), the party's internal disciplinary body, and the National Supervisory Commission, the highest anti-corruption agency of China. On 18 December 2022, he was expelled from the CCP and dismissed from public office. He was downgraded to a first-level chief section member (clerk) (一级主任科员).

Business positions
Preceded by Guo Shengkun	General Manager of the Aluminum Corporation of China Limited; 2004–2009	Succeeded by Xiong Weiping
Government offices
Preceded by Zhang Yi	Director of the State-owned Assets Supervision and Administration Commission; 2016–2019	Succeeded by Hao Peng
Preceded by Zhang Mao	Director of the State Administration for Market Regulation; 2019–2021	Succeeded by Zhang Gong
Preceded by Miao Wei	Minister of Industry and Information Technology; 2020–2022	Succeeded by Jin Zhuanglong
