= China Aluminum International Engineering =

Chinese engineering firm

China Aluminum International Engineering Co., Ltd.
- Native name: 中铝国际工程股份有限公司
- Company type: State-owned enterprise
- Industry: Engineering, consulting, and technical services
- Headquarters: Beijing, China
- Revenue: RMB 16.4 billion (2012)
- Net income: RMB 1.44 billion (2012)
- Parent: Aluminum Corporation of China (Chinalco)
- Website: Chalieco.com.cn

China Aluminum International Engineering SEHK: 2068 (also known as Chalieco) is a Chinese engineering firm in businesses including engineering design and consultancy, engineering and construction contracting and equipment manufacturing. As a contractor it is the 124th largest construction firm in the world as ranked by Engineering News-Record in 2013.

It operates as a subsidiary of the Aluminum Corporation of China (Chinalco), which holds 83% of the shareholding of the company. The company premièred on the Hong Kong Stock Exchange with a 2012 IPO that listed 15% of the shares on the exchange.

The company has invested heavily in operations in Vietnam and Venezuela.
