= Amateur radio licensing in China =

In China, an amateur radio station operator generally needs to obtain two separate documents: the Amateur Radio Station License of the People's Republic of China and the Certificate of Amateur Radio Operation. Both the license and the certificate are governed by the State Radio Regulation of China (SRRC). The Operation Certificate is the proof of an amateur radio operator's personal operational and technical competence, the permission to use an amateur radio station, and the prerequisite for applying for an amateur radio station license, while the Amateur Radio Station License is the permission to set up an amateur radio station. The operators must obtain the operation certificate before they can further obtain the license. Only after obtaining the license will the operators be assigned a call sign by the authority.

== Operation Certificate ==
The Certificate of Amateur Radio Operation is the prerequisite for applying to set up an amateur radio station. Currently, it is supervised and produced by the Ministry of Industry and Information Technology, and is responsible for being issued by local radio regulatory authorities. It is valid nationwide and is effective for a lifetime.

Operation Certificates are divided into three categories: Class A, Class B, and Class C. Certificate holders of different categories possess different operational privileges within the amateur radio bands. Setting up an amateur radio station and applying for a Radio Station License also requires the Operation Certificate as credentials.

Class	Available Bands	Maximum Transmit Power
Class A	Amateur bands within the range of 30-3000MHz	Not greater than 25 Watts
Class B	All amateur bands	Less than 15 Watts for bands below 30MHz, not greater than 25 Watts for bands above 30MHz (Note: Those who obtained a Class B Operation Certificate before March 1, 2024, can set up amateur stations with a power not greater than 100 Watts for bands below 30MHz.)
Class C	All amateur bands	Less than 1000 Watts for bands below 30MHz, not greater than 25 Watts for bands above 30MHz

Amateur radio operators need to participate in examinations organized by the radio regulatory authorities to obtain the Operation Certificate. First-time applicants are not subject to any age restrictions. However they can only take the Class A exam. Those who have obtained a Class A Operation Certificate and held an amateur radio station license for more than 6 months can take the Class B exam. Those who have obtained a Class B Operation Certificate and held an amateur radio station license specifying bands below 30MHz for more than 18 months can take the Class C exam. Under normal circumstances, Class A and Class B examinations are organized by the local examination authorities of various provinces and cities, while the Class C examination is uniformly organized by the Chinese Radio Amateurs Club (CRAC) as entrusted by the Radio Regulatory Bureau of the Ministry of Industry and Information Technology.

New Version of Operation Certificate
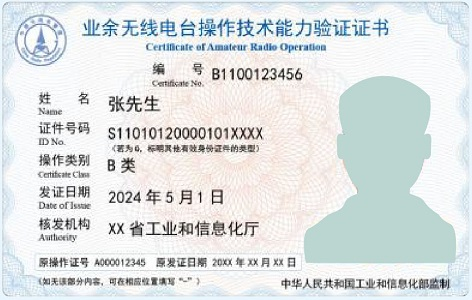
Sample front side of the new version of the Certificate of Amateur Radio Operation issued starting from 2025

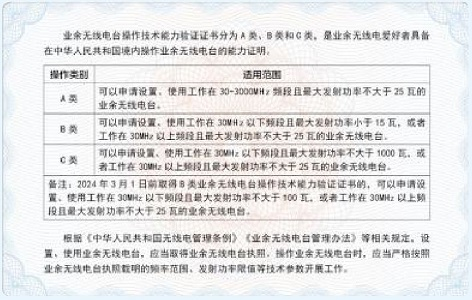
Back side of the new version of the Certificate of Amateur Radio Operation issued starting from 2025

== Amateur Radio Station License ==
The Amateur Radio Station License of the People's Republic of China is the permission for amateur radio operators to set up amateur radio stations, which is issued by the local radio regulatory authorities or the Ministry of Industry and Information Technology. The amateur radio station license implements a category-based system corresponding to the operation certificate, and amateur radio operators need to hold the corresponding category of operation certificate to set up an amateur radio station. The amateur radio station intended to be set up must possess a Radio Transmission Equipment Type Approval Code (CMIIT ID) or pass verification testing.

When issuing a radio station license, the radio regulatory authority will assign a call sign at the same time. Call signs are generally allocated by the radio regulatory authority, and individuals cannot select call signs on their own. The validity period of an amateur radio station license is five years at most. If continuous usage is required, an application for the renewal of the amateur radio station license must be submitted to the radio regulatory authority that made the licensing decision 30 working days before the expiration of the term.

Minors can apply to set up and use amateur radio stations operating within the 30-3000MHz band with a maximum transmit power of not greater than 25 Watts. In addition to general application materials, they also need to submit a photocopy of their guardian's identity certificate, as well as materials explaining the relationship between the applicant and the guardian.

Current Radio Station License
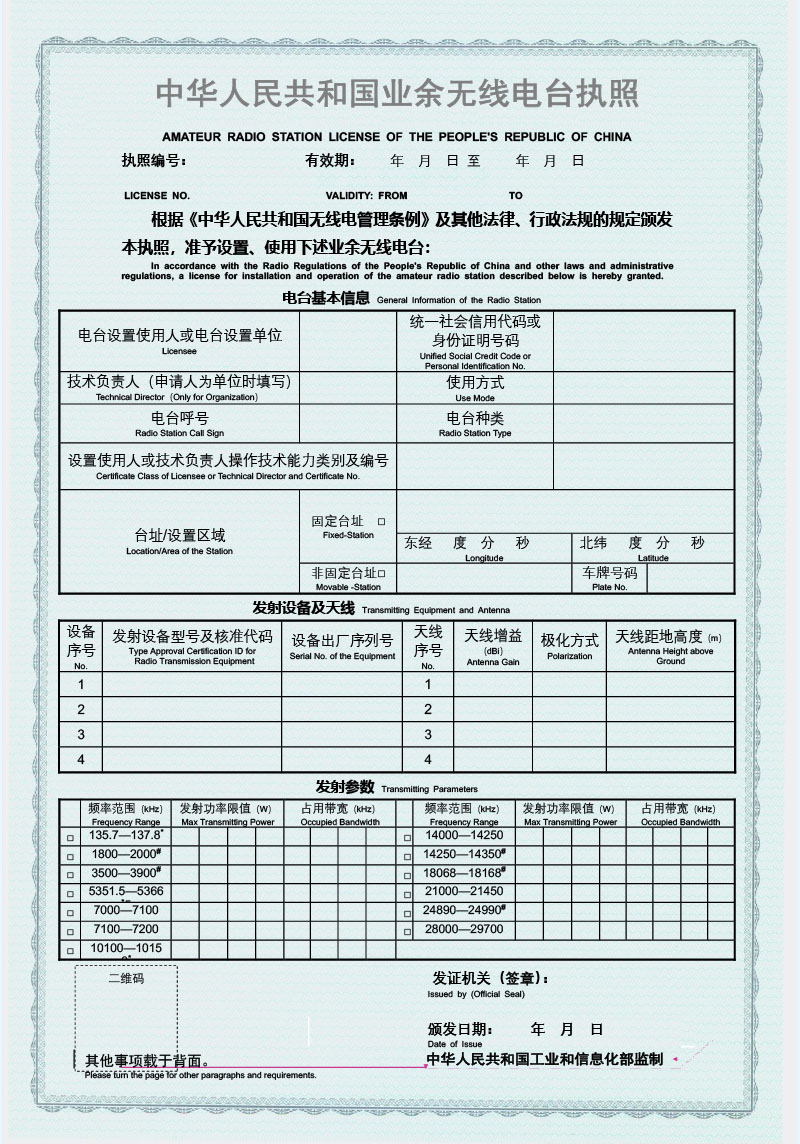
Front side of the radio station license

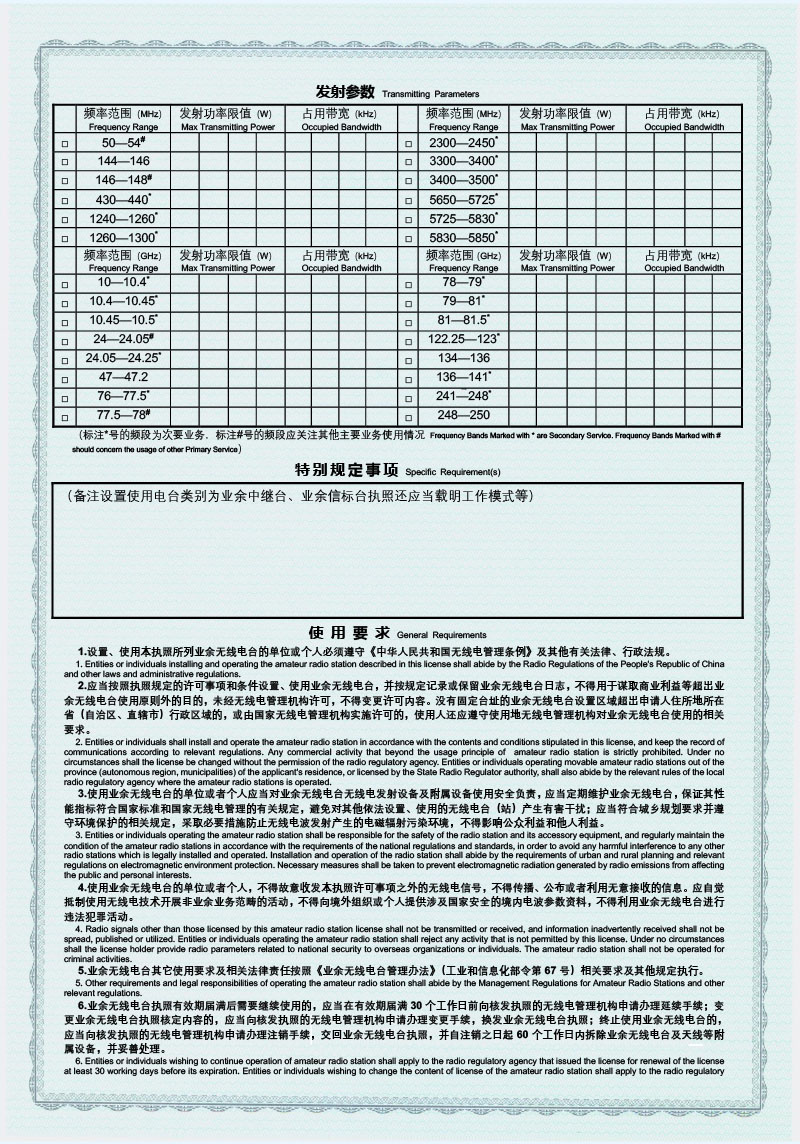
Back side of the radio station license

== Call signs ==
Table of allocation of international call sign series

Amateur Radio Callsign Area in China
1st Letter B	2nd Letter	Zone	Province	Example
B	generally A, D, G, H, I	1	Beijing (1AA~1XZZ)	BA1AB; BD2ABC; BR4IN (R is used for repeaters); BY1PK (Y is used for club stations (Note: Y is now no longer issued. Currently, club stations are assigned call signs within the same series as individuals.))
B	generally A, D, G, H, I	2	Heilongjiang (2AA~2HZZ); Jilin (2IA~2PZZ); Liaoning (2QA~2XZZ)	BA1AB; BD2ABC; BR4IN (R is used for repeaters); BY1PK (Y is used for club stations)
B	generally A, D, G, H, I	3	Tianjin (3AA~3FZZ); Neimenggu (3GA~3LZZ); Hebei (3MA~3RZZ); Shanxi(3SA~3XZZ)	BA1AB; BD2ABC; BR4IN (R is used for repeaters); BY1PK (Y is used for club stations)
B	generally A, D, G, H, I	4	Shanghai (4AA~4HZZ); Shandong (4IA~4PZZ); Jiangsu (4QA~4XZZ)	BA1AB; BD2ABC; BR4IN (R is used for repeaters); BY1PK (Y is used for club stations)
B	generally A, D, G, H, I	5	Zhejiang (5AA~5HZZ); Jiangxi (5IA~5PZZ); Fujian (5QA~5XZZ)	BA1AB; BD2ABC; BR4IN (R is used for repeaters); BY1PK (Y is used for club stations)
B	generally A, D, G, H, I	6	Anhui (6AA~6HZZ); Henan (6IA~6PZZ); Hubei(6QA~6XZZ)	BA1AB; BD2ABC; BR4IN (R is used for repeaters); BY1PK (Y is used for club stations)
B	generally A, D, G, H, I	7	Hunan (7AA~7HZZ); Guangdong (7IA~7PZZ); Guangxi (7QA~7XZZ); Hainan (7YA~7YZZ)	BA1AB; BD2ABC; BR4IN (R is used for repeaters); BY1PK (Y is used for club stations)
B	generally A, D, G, H, I	8	Sichuan (8AA~8FZZ); Chongqing (8GA~8LZZ); Guizhou (8MA~8RZZ); Yunnan (8SA~8XZZ)	BA1AB; BD2ABC; BR4IN (R is used for repeaters); BY1PK (Y is used for club stations)
B	generally A, D, G, H, I	9	Shaanxi (9AA~9FZZ); Gansu (9GA~9LZZ); Ningxia (9MA~9RZZ); Qinghai (9SA~9XZZ)	BA1AB; BD2ABC; BR4IN (R is used for repeaters); BY1PK (Y is used for club stations)
B	generally A, D, G, H, I	0	Xinjiang (0AA~0FZZ); Xizang (0GA~0LZZ)	BA1AB; BD2ABC; BR4IN (R is used for repeaters); BY1PK (Y is used for club stations)
