= SRRC =

SRRC may refer to:

- Scenic Rim Regional Council, a local government area in Australia
- Seal Rehabilitation and Research Centre, a pinniped rehabilitation and research center in the Netherlands
- Somalia Reconciliation and Restoration Council, a former political movement and paramilitary organization in Somalia
- South Sudan Relief and Rehabilitation Commission, an agency of the Government of South Sudan
- Southern Regional Research Center, an agricultural research laboratory in the United States
- Square-root-raised-cosine filter, a linear filter in the time domain
- State Radio Regulation of China, the radio regulation authority of China
