= Minister of Industry and Information Technology =

Minister of the People's Republic of China

Minister of Industry and Information Technology of the People's Republic of China
- 中华人民共和国工业和信息化部部长
- National Emblem of China

- Flag of China
- Incumbent; Vacant since 6 November 2026
- Ministry of Industry and Information Technology
- Status: Provincial and ministerial-level official
- Member of: Plenary Meeting of the State Council
- Seat: Ministry of Industry and Information Technology Building, Xicheng District, Beijing
- Nominator: Premier (chosen within the Chinese Communist Party)
- Appointer: President; with the confirmation of the National People's Congress or its Standing Committee
- Formation: March 1998; 28 years ago
- First holder: Wu Jichuan
- Deputy: Vice Minister of Industry and Information Technology

The minister of industry and information technology of the People's Republic of China is the head of the Ministry of Industry and Information Technology of the People's Republic of China and a member of the State Council. Within the State Council, the position is sixth in order of precedence. The minister is responsible for leading the ministry, presiding over its meetings, and signing important documents related to the ministry. Officially, the minister is nominated by the premier of the State Council, who is then approved by the National People's Congress or its Standing Committee and appointed by the president.

The current minister is vacant as the previous minister Li Lecheng was appointed Party Secretary of Anhui on 23 September 2026.

== List of ministers ==
| No. | Name | Took office | Left office | Ref. |
|---|---|---|---|---|
Minister of Information Industry
| 1 | Wu Jichuan | March 1998 | March 2003 | |
| 2 | Wang Xudong | March 2003 | March 2008 | |
Minister of Industry and Information Technology
| 3 | Li Yizhong | March 2008 | December 2010 | |
| 4 | Miao Wei | December 2010 | August 2020 | |
| 5 | Xiao Yaqing | August 2020 | July 2022 | |
| 6 | Jin Zhuanglong | July 2022 | April 2025 | |
| 7 | Li Lecheng | April 2025 | 6 November 2026 | |
