= Jin Zhuanglong =

Chinese politician

- 金壮龙
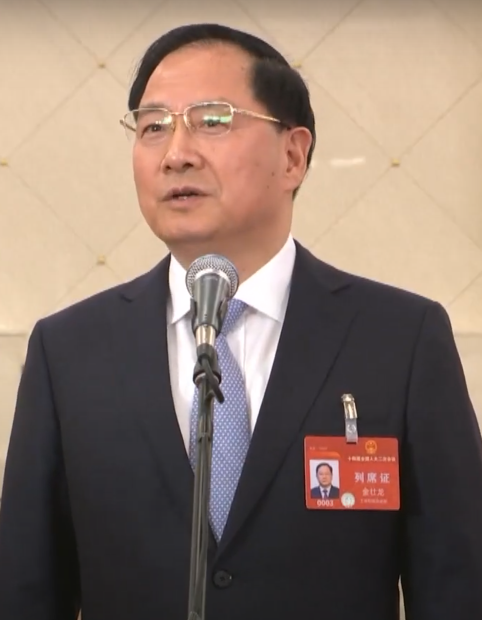
- Jin in 2024

Minister of Industry and Information Technology
- In office 29 July 2022 – 30 April 2025
- Premier: Li Keqiang; Li Qiang
- Preceded by: Xiao Yaqing
- Succeeded by: Li Lecheng

Executive Deputy Director of Central Military-civilian Integration Development Committee Office
- In office 2017–2022

Personal details
- Born: March 1964 (age 62) Dinghai County, Zhejiang, China
- Party: Chinese Communist Party (1984-2026, expelled)
- Education: Beihang University (BE); Shanghai Academy of Spaceflight Technology (MEng); Fudan University (DEcon)

Chinese name
- Simplified Chinese: 金壮龙
- Traditional Chinese: 金壯龍
Transcriptions
Standard Mandarin
- Hanyu Pinyin: Jīn Zhuànglóng

Jin Zhuanglong (Chinese: 金壮龙; born March 1964) is a Chinese business executive and politician. He previously served as minister of industry and information technology of China from 2022 to 2025, executive deputy director of the Central Military-civilian Integration Development Committee Office from 2017 to 2022, chairman of the board and party secretary of the Commercial Aircraft Corporation of China from 2012 to 2017, and general manager of the corporation from 2008 to 2012.

He was an alternate of the 17th and 18th Central Committee of the Chinese Communist Party, and a member of the 19th Central Committee of the Chinese Communist Party. He was a representative of the 19th National Congress of the Chinese Communist Party and was a representative of the 20th National Congress of the Chinese Communist Party. In 2026, Jin was expelled from the Chinese Communist Party.

== Biography ==
Jin was born in the town of Lincheng, Dinghai County (now Dinghai District of Zhoushan), Zhejiang, in March 1964. He attended the Zhejiang Zhoushan High School.

Jin received a Bachelor of Engineering with a major in winged missile design from Beihang University in 1986, a Master of Engineering from the Shanghai Academy of Spaceflight Technology in 1989, and a Doctor of Economics in industrial economics from Fudan University in 2003. He took training classes at the Central Party School from 1997 to 1998, from 2007 to 2008, and in 2010.

Jin joined the Chinese Communist Party in May 1984. Starting in June 1989, he successively served as a technician, engineering team leader, deputy director of the research office, assistant engineer, engineer, senior engineer, and researcher at the Eighth Design Department of Shanghai Aerospace Bureau. He moved up the ranks to become deputy director in May 1993 and director in February 1996. He rose to become director of Shanghai Aerospace Bureau (now Shanghai Academy of Spaceflight Technology) in January 1998.

In June 1999, he was assigned to the China Aerospace Science and Technology Corporation, becoming deputy general manager in December 2001.

In June 2004, he was appointed secretary-general of the Commission for Science, Technology and Industry for National Defense, in addition to serving as deputy director of the China National Space Administration. In July 2005, he was made deputy director of the Commission for Science, Technology and Industry for National Defense, concurrently serving as deputy leader of the Preparatory Team for the Large Passenger Aircraft Project.

In March 2008, he was chosen as general manager, vice chairman and deputy party secretary of the Commercial Aircraft Corporation of China, rising to chairman and party secretary in January 2012.

He was promoted to executive deputy director of the Central Military-civilian Integration Development Committee Office, a position at ministerial level.

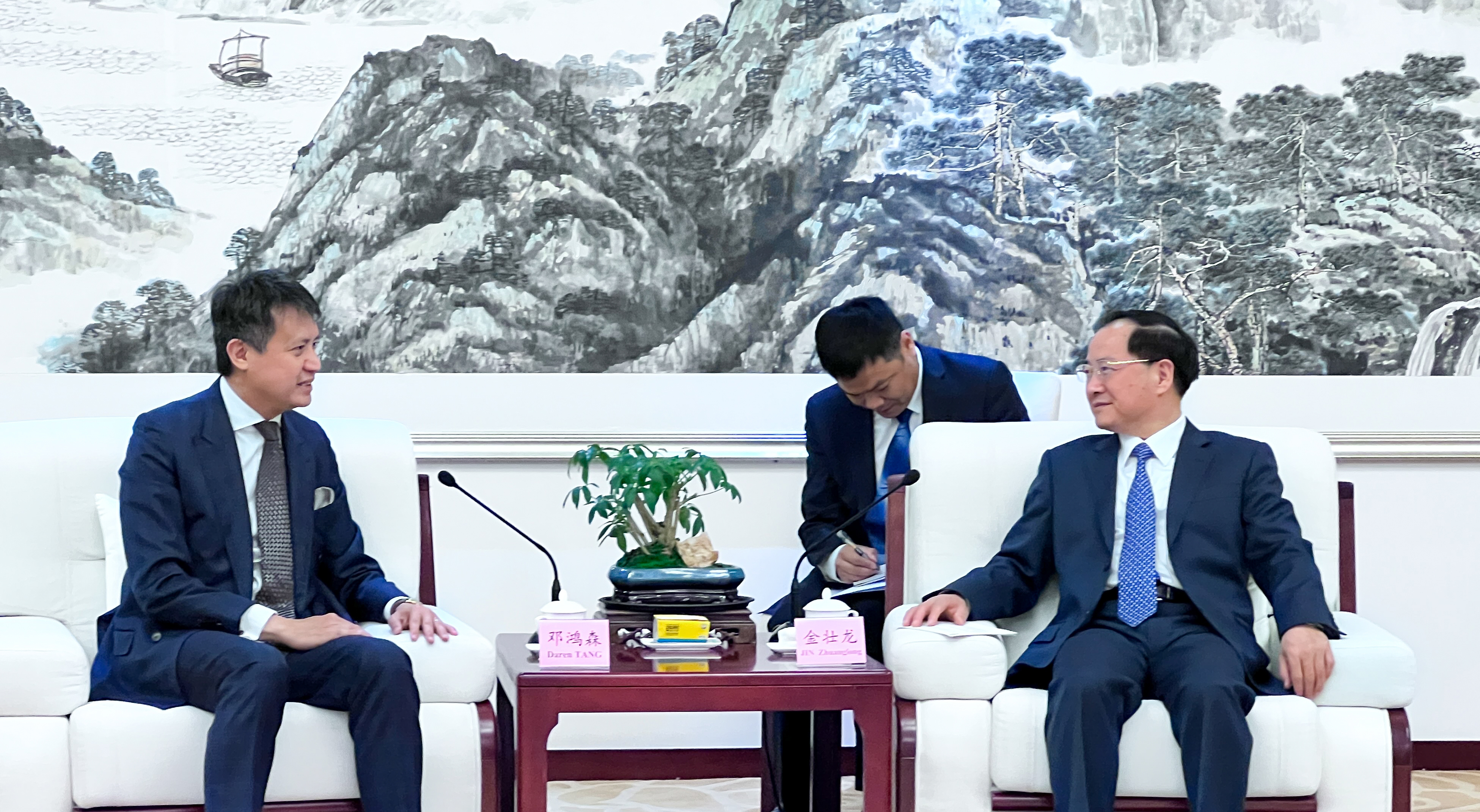
Jin (right) with World Intellectual Property Organization Director General Daren Tang (left), April 28, 2023

On 29 July 2022, he was appointed party secretary of the Ministry of Industry and Information Technology, replacing Xiao Yaqing, who was put under investigation for suspected "violation of discipline and law" by the Central Commission for Discipline Inspection (CCDI), the party's internal disciplinary body, and the National Supervisory Commission, the highest anti-corruption agency of China.

In July 2024, the ministry under Jin announced plans to expand China's breakthroughs in emerging technology and to bypass "containment efforts" by the United States. These emerging technologies include humanoid robots, 6G mobile technology, and atomic-level manufacturing. In a visit by Apple's CEO Tim Cook with Jin and ministry officials in October 2024, Jin hoped that Apple will increase its presence in the Chinese market.

On 28 February 2025, Jin was succeeded as the Party Secretary of the Ministry of Industry and Information Technology by Li Lecheng after some months away from the public eye. His removal is perceived to be related to the government's intensification of anti-corruption investigations into its defence sector where Jin served before. He left the position of the Minister of Industry and Information Technology on April 30, 2025.

On 29 October 2026, the fifth plenary session of the 20th CCP Central Committee reviewed and approved the report of the CCDI on the "serious violations of discipline and law" by Jin and confirmed the Politburo decision to expel him from the CCP.

Government offices
Preceded by Sun Laiyan	Secretary-General of the Commission for Science, Technology and Industry for National Defense; 2004–2006	Succeeded by Huang Qiang
Preceded by Xiao Yaqing	Minister of Industry and Information Technology; 2022–2025	Succeeded by Li Lecheng
Business positions
New title	General Manager of the Commercial Aircraft Corporation of China, Ltd. 2008–2012	Succeeded by He Dongfeng
Preceded by Zhang Qingwei	Chairman of Commercial Aircraft Corporation of China, Ltd. 2012–2017	Succeeded by He Dongfeng
Party political offices
New title	Executive Deputy Director of the Office of the Central Military Civilian Integration Development Commission; 2017–2022	Succeeded by TBA
