= Pre-election pendulum for the 2016 Australian federal election =

This is a Mackerras pendulum for the 2016 Australian federal election.

== History ==
The Mackerras pendulum was devised by the Australian psephologist Malcolm Mackerras as a way of predicting the outcome of an election contested between two major parties in a Westminster style lower house legislature such as the Australian House of Representatives, which is composed of single-member electorates and which uses a preferential voting system such as a Condorcet method or IRV.

The pendulum works by lining up all of the seats held in Parliament for the government, the opposition and the crossbench according to the percentage point margin they are held by on a two-party or two-candidate basis. This is also known as the swing required for the seat to change hands. Given a uniform swing to the opposition or government parties, the number of seats that change hands can be predicted.

Classification of seats as marginal, fairly safe or safe is applied by the independent Australian Electoral Commission using the following definition: "Where a winning party receives less than 56% of the vote, the seat is classified as 'marginal', 56–60% is classified as 'fairly safe' and more than 60% is considered 'safe'."

== Pre-election pendulum ==
Based on the 2013 post-election pendulum for the Australian federal election, this pendulum has been updated to include new notional margin estimates due to redistributions in New South Wales, Western Australia and the Australian Capital Territory. The net effect of the redistributions reduced the Liberal/National Coalition from 90 to a notional 88 seats and increased Labor from 55 to a notional 57 seats.

Whilst every federal election after 1961 has been won by those that also won the majority of federal seats in New South Wales, unusually nearly half of all marginal government seats are in New South Wales at this election of which nearly half are all in Western Sydney and the other half all in rural and regional areas, and with no more than a few seats each in every other state.

Assuming a theoretical uniform swing, for the Labor opposition to get to 76 seats and majority government would require Labor with 50.5 percent of the two-party vote from a 4.0-point two-party swing or greater, while for the incumbent Coalition to lose majority government would require the Coalition with 50.2 percent of the two-party vote from a 3.3-point two-party swing or greater.

Government seats
Marginal
| Petrie (Qld) | Luke Howarth | LNP | 50.5 |
| Capricornia (Qld) | Michelle Landry | LNP | 50.8 |
| O’Connor (WA) | Rick Wilson | LIB | 50.9 v NWA |
| Lyons (Tas) | Eric Hutchinson | LIB | 51.2 |
| Solomon (NT) | Natasha Griggs | CLP | 51.4 |
| Hindmarsh (SA) | Matt Williams | LIB | 51.9 |
| Braddon (Tas) | Brett Whiteley | LIB | 52.6 |
| Banks (NSW) | David Coleman | LIB | 52.8 |
| Eden-Monaro (NSW) | Peter Hendy | LIB | 52.9 |
| Lindsay (NSW) | Fiona Scott | LIB | 53.0 |
| Page (NSW) | Kevin Hogan | NAT | 53.1 |
| Robertson (NSW) | Lucy Wicks | LIB | 53.1 |
| Deakin (Vic) | Michael Sukkar | LIB | 53.2 |
| Macarthur (NSW) | Russell Matheson | LIB | 53.3 |
^^^ Government loses majority on a uniform swing ^^^
| Reid (NSW) | Craig Laundy | LIB | 53.3 |
| Bonner (Qld) | Ross Vasta | LNP | 53.7 |
| Gilmore (NSW) | Ann Sudmalis | LIB | 53.8 |
| Corangamite (Vic) | Sarah Henderson | LIB | 53.9 |
| Durack (WA) | Melissa Price | LIB | 53.9 v NWA |
| La Trobe (Vic) | Jason Wood | LIB | 54.0 |
| Bass (Tas) | Andrew Nikolic | LIB | 54.0 |
^^^ Opposition wins majority on a uniform swing ^^^
| Brisbane (Qld) | Teresa Gambaro | LNP | 54.3 |
| Forde (Qld) | Bert van Manen | LNP | 54.4 |
| Cowan (WA) | Luke Simpkins | LIB | 54.5 |
| Macquarie (NSW) | Louise Markus | LIB | 54.5 |
| Dunkley (Vic) | Bruce Billson | LIB | 55.6 |
| Leichhardt (Qld) | Warren Entsch | LNP | 55.7 |
Fairly safe
| Hasluck (WA) | Ken Wyatt | LIB | 56.0 |
| Burt (WA) | new seat | LIB | 56.1 |
| Herbert (Qld) | Ewen Jones | LNP | 56.2 |
| Flynn (Qld) | Ken O'Dowd | LNP | 56.5 |
| Dickson (Qld) | Peter Dutton | LNP | 56.7 |
| Longman (Qld) | Wyatt Roy | LNP | 56.9 |
| Boothby (SA) | Andrew Southcott | LIB | 57.1 |
| Casey (Vic) | Tony Smith | LIB | 57.2 |
| Swan (WA) | Steve Irons | LIB | 57.3 |
| Dawson (Qld) | George Christensen | LNP | 57.6 |
| Bennelong (NSW) | John Alexander | LIB | 57.8 |
| Aston (Vic) | Alan Tudge | LIB | 58.2 |
| Ryan (Qld) | Jane Prentice | LNP | 58.5 |
| Bowman (Qld) | Andrew Laming | LNP | 58.9 |
| Hinkler (Qld) | Keith Pitt | LNP | 59.0 |
| Stirling (WA) | Michael Keenan | LIB | 59.0 |
| Pearce (WA) | Christian Porter | LIB | 59.3 |
| Fisher (Qld) | Mal Brough | LNP | 59.8 |
| Higgins (Vic) | Kelly O'Dwyer | LIB | 59.9 |
Safe
| Sturt (SA) | Christopher Pyne | LIB | 60.1 |
| Wannon (Vic) | Dan Tehan | LIB | 60.1 |
| Goldstein (Vic) | Andrew Robb | LIB | 61.0 |
| Kooyong (Vic) | Josh Frydenberg | LIB | 61.1 |
| Canning (WA) | Andrew Hastie | LIB | 61.3 |
| Flinders (Vic) | Greg Hunt | LIB | 61.8 |
| Hughes (NSW) | Craig Kelly | LIB | 61.8 |
| McMillan (Vic) | Russell Broadbent | LIB | 61.8 |
| Wright (Qld) | Scott Buchholz | LNP | 61.8 |
| Moore (WA) | Ian Goodenough | LIB | 62.4 |
| Mayo (SA) | Jamie Briggs | LIB | 62.5 |
| McPherson (Qld) | Karen Andrews | LNP | 63.0 |
| Tangney (WA) | Dennis Jensen | LIB | 63.0 |
| Cowper (NSW) | Luke Hartsuyker | NAT | 63.2 |
| Wide Bay (Qld) | Warren Truss | LNP | 63.2 |
| Grey (SA) | Rowan Ramsey | LIB | 63.5 |
| Hume (NSW) | Angus Taylor | LIB | 63.6 |
| Lyne (NSW) | David Gillespie | NAT | 63.6 |
| Forrest (WA) | Nola Marino | LIB | 63.8 |
| Fadden (Qld) | Stuart Robert | LNP | 64.4 |
| Menzies (Vic) | Kevin Andrews | LIB | 64.4 |
| Calare (NSW) | John Cobb | NAT | 65.0 |
| Warringah (NSW) | Tony Abbott | LIB | 65.3 |
| Cook (NSW) | Scott Morrison | LIB | 65.7 |
| North Sydney (NSW) | Trent Zimmerman | LIB | 65.7 |
| Gippsland (Vic) | Darren Chester | NAT | 65.8 |
| Barker (SA) | Tony Pasin | LIB | 66.5 |
| Groom (Qld) | Ian Macfarlane | LNP | 66.5 |
| Moncrieff (Qld) | Steven Ciobo | LNP | 68.0 |
| Curtin (WA) | Julie Bishop | LIB | 68.2 |
| Mackellar (NSW) | Bronwyn Bishop | LIB | 68.8 |
| Wentworth (NSW) | Malcolm Turnbull | LIB | 68.9 |
| Berowra (NSW) | Philip Ruddock | LIB | 69.0 |
| Riverina (NSW) | Michael McCormack | NAT | 69.0 |
| New England (NSW) | Barnaby Joyce | NAT | 69.5 |
| Parkes (NSW) | Mark Coulton | NAT | 69.9 |
| Bradfield (NSW) | Paul Fletcher | LIB | 70.9 |
| Murray (Vic) | Sharman Stone | LIB | 70.9 |
| Mitchell (NSW) | Alex Hawke | LIB | 71.4 |
| Farrer (NSW) | Sussan Ley | LIB | 71.7 |
| Maranoa (Qld) | Bruce Scott | LNP | 72.3 |
| Mallee (Vic) | Andrew Broad | NAT | 73.7 |

Non-government seats
Marginal
| Dobell (NSW) | Karen McNamara ^{[a]} | ALP | 50.2 |
| McEwen (Vic) | Rob Mitchell | ALP | 50.2 |
| Paterson (NSW) | Bob Baldwin ^{[a]} | ALP | 50.3 |
| Lingiari (NT) | Warren Snowdon | ALP | 50.9 |
| Bendigo (Vic) | Lisa Chesters | ALP | 51.3 |
| Lilley (Qld) | Wayne Swan | ALP | 51.3 |
| Parramatta (NSW) | Julie Owens | ALP | 51.3 |
| Chisholm (Vic) | Anna Burke | ALP | 51.6 |
| Moreton (Qld) | Graham Perrett | ALP | 51.6 |
| Richmond (NSW) | Justine Elliot | ALP | 51.6 |
| Bruce (Vic) | Alan Griffin | ALP | 51.8 |
| Perth (WA) | Alannah MacTiernan | ALP | 52.2 |
| Kingsford Smith (NSW) | Matt Thistlethwaite | ALP | 52.7 |
| Greenway (NSW) | Michelle Rowland | ALP | 53.0 |
| Griffith (Qld) | Terri Butler | ALP | 53.0 |
| Jagajaga (Vic) | Jenny Macklin | ALP | 53.1 |
| Wakefield (SA) | Nick Champion | ALP | 53.4 |
| Melbourne Ports (Vic) | Michael Danby | ALP | 53.6 |
| Brand (WA) | Gary Gray | ALP | 53.7 |
| Oxley (Qld) | Bernie Ripoll | ALP | 53.8 |
| Adelaide (SA) | Kate Ellis | ALP | 53.9 |
| Isaacs (Vic) | Mark Dreyfus | ALP | 53.9 |
| Barton (NSW) | Nickolas Varvaris ^{[a]} | ALP | 54.4 |
| McMahon (NSW) | Chris Bowen | ALP | 54.6 |
| Rankin (Qld) | Jim Chalmers | ALP | 54.8 |
| Ballarat (Vic) | Catherine King | ALP | 54.9 |
| Franklin (Tas) | Julie Collins | ALP | 55.1 |
| Makin (SA) | Tony Zappia | ALP | 55.1 |
| Blair (Qld) | Shayne Neumann | ALP | 55.3 |
| Fremantle (WA) | Melissa Parke | ALP | 55.4 |
| Hunter (NSW) ^{[b]} | Joel Fitzgibbon | ALP | 55.7 |
Fairly safe
| Werriwa (NSW) | Laurie Ferguson | ALP | 56.5 |
| Whitlam (NSW) | Stephen Jones | ALP | 56.9 |
| Hotham (Vic) | Clare O'Neil | ALP | 57.3 |
| Shortland (NSW) | Jill Hall | ALP | 57.4 |
| Canberra (ACT) | Gai Brodtmann | ALP | 57.5 |
| Corio (Vic) | Richard Marles | ALP | 57.7 |
| Watson (NSW) | Tony Burke | ALP | 58.9 |
| Holt (Vic) | Anthony Byrne | ALP | 59.1 |
| Newcastle (NSW) | Sharon Claydon | ALP | 59.4 |
| Kingston (SA) | Amanda Rishworth | ALP | 59.7 |
Safe
| Batman (Vic) | David Feeney | ALP | 60.6 v GRN |
| Chifley (NSW) | Ed Husic | ALP | 60.9 |
| Blaxland (NSW) | Jason Clare | ALP | 61.2 |
| Cunningham (NSW) | Sharon Bird | ALP | 61.3 |
| Maribyrnong (Vic) | Bill Shorten | ALP | 61.4 |
| Lalor (Vic) | Joanne Ryan | ALP | 62.2 |
| Fenner (ACT) | Andrew Leigh | ALP | 62.5 |
| Fowler (NSW) | Chris Hayes | ALP | 62.9 |
| Sydney (NSW) | Tanya Plibersek | ALP | 62.9 |
| Calwell (Vic) | Maria Vamvakinou | ALP | 63.9 |
| Port Adelaide (SA) | Mark Butler | ALP | 64.0 |
| Scullin (Vic) | Andrew Giles | ALP | 64.3 |
| Wills (Vic) | Kelvin Thomson | ALP | 65.2 v GRN |
| Gorton (Vic) | Brendan O’Connor | ALP | 66.1 |
| Gellibrand (Vic) | Tim Watts | ALP | 66.5 |
| Grayndler (NSW) | Anthony Albanese | ALP | 68.8 |
Crossbench seats
| Fairfax (Qld) | Clive Palmer | PUP | 50.0 v LNP |
| Indi (Vic) | Cathy McGowan | IND | 50.3 v LIB |
| Kennedy (Qld) | Bob Katter | KAP | 52.2 v LNP |
| Melbourne (Vic) | Adam Bandt | GRN | 55.3 v ALP |
| Denison (Tas) | Andrew Wilkie | IND | 65.5 v ALP |

== Notes ==
^{a} Though the seats of Dobell, Paterson and Barton were Liberal wins at the previous election, redistributions changed them in to notionally marginal Labor seats.

^{b} Pat Conroy is the current MP for the Division of Charlton which is being renamed to the Division of Hunter at the next election.
