= Barnaby Joyce =

Australian politician (born 1967)

The Honourable Barnaby Joyce MP
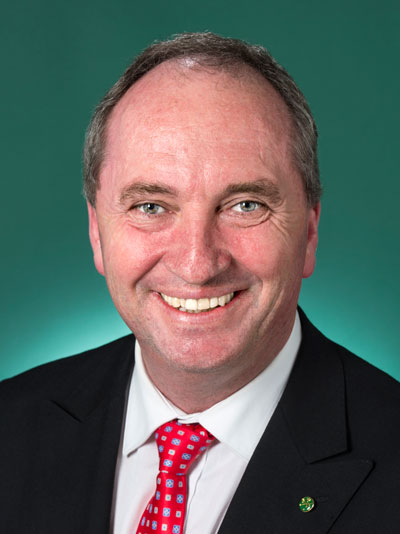
- Official portrait, 2017

Deputy Prime Minister of Australia
- In office 22 June 2021 – 23 May 2022
- Prime Minister: Scott Morrison
- Preceded by: Michael McCormack
- Succeeded by: Richard Marles
- In office 18 February 2016 – 26 February 2018^{[a]}
- Prime Minister: Malcolm Turnbull
- Preceded by: Warren Truss
- Succeeded by: Michael McCormack

Leader of the National Party
- In office 21 June 2021 – 30 May 2022
- Deputy: David Littleproud
- Preceded by: Michael McCormack
- Succeeded by: David Littleproud
- In office 11 February 2016 – 26 February 2018
- Deputy: Fiona Nash; Bridget McKenzie
- Preceded by: Warren Truss
- Succeeded by: Michael McCormack
Other positions
Minister for Infrastructure, Transport and Regional Development Infrastructure & Transport (December 2017 – February 2018)
In office 22 June 2021 – 23 May 2022
| Prime Minister | Scott Morrison |
| Preceded by | Michael McCormack |
| Succeeded by | Catherine King |
In office 20 December 2017 – 26 February 2018
| Prime Minister | Malcolm Turnbull |
| Preceded by | Darren Chester |
| Succeeded by | Michael McCormack |
Minister for Resources and Northern Australia Acting
In office 25 July 2017 – 27 October 2017
| Prime Minister | Malcolm Turnbull |
| Preceded by | Matt Canavan |
| Succeeded by | Matt Canavan |
Minister for Agriculture and Water Resources
In office 18 September 2013 – 27 October 2017; 6 December 2017 – 20 December 2017
| Prime Minister | Malcolm Turnbull; Tony Abbott |
| Preceded by | Joel Fitzgibbon |
| Succeeded by | David Littleproud |
Deputy Leader of the National Party
In office 13 September 2013 – 11 February 2016
| Leader | Warren Truss |
| Preceded by | Nigel Scullion |
| Succeeded by | Fiona Nash |
Leader of the National Party in the Senate
In office 18 September 2008 – 8 August 2013
| Deputy | Nigel Scullion |
| Leader | Warren Truss |
| Preceded by | Nigel Scullion |
| Succeeded by | Nigel Scullion |

Member of the Australian Parliament for New England
- Incumbent
- Assumed office 7 September 2013
- Preceded by: Tony Windsor

Senator for Queensland
- In office 1 July 2005 – 8 August 2013
- Preceded by: Len Harris
- Succeeded by: Barry O'Sullivan

Personal details
- Born: 17 April 1967 (age 59) Tamworth, New South Wales, Australia
- Citizenship: Australia; New Zealand (until 2017)
- Party: One Nation (since 2025)
- Other political affiliations: National (1995–2025) (Note: Liberal National (2010–2013))
- Education: St. Ignatius' College
- Alma mater: University of New England
- Occupation: Accountant; politician

Military service
- Branch/service: Australian Army Reserve
- Years of service: 1996–2001
- Unit: Royal Queensland Regiment
- ^aOffice vacant from 27 October 2017 to 6 December 2017.

Barnaby Thomas Gerard Joyce (born 17 April 1967) is an Australian politician who served as the deputy prime minister of Australia and the leader of the National Party from 2016 to 2018 and from 2021 to 2022. Now a member of One Nation, he has been the member of parliament (MP) for the New South Wales division of New England since 2013. Joyce previously held various ministerial positions in the Abbott, Turnbull, and Morrison governments.

Joyce was born in Tamworth, New South Wales, and graduated from the University of New England. He was elected to the Senate for Queensland at the 2004 federal election, and became the National Party's Senate leader in 2008. At the 2013 election, he transferred to the House of Representatives, winning the rural seat of New England in New South Wales. In 2013, Joyce replaced Nigel Scullion as deputy leader of the National Party. He succeeded Warren Truss as party leader and deputy prime minister in 2016.

During the 2017–18 Australian parliamentary eligibility crisis, Joyce was confirmed to be a dual citizen of New Zealand, which is forbidden for parliamentarians under section 44 of the Constitution of Australia. In October 2017, the High Court of Australia ruled that he had been ineligible to be a candidate for the House of Representatives at the time of the 2016 election. He re-entered parliament in December 2017 after winning the New England by-election. Joyce resigned from the National Party to join One Nation in 2025, holding one of two seats held by the party, the other held by David Farley, who was elected at the 2026 Farrer by-election.

== Early life and career ==
Barnaby Thomas Gerard Joyce was born on 17 April 1967 at Tamworth Base Hospital in Tamworth, New South Wales, to James Joyce (1924–2022) and Beryl Joyce (née Roche; 1930–2020), both of whom were farmers. His father, a World War II veteran, was born in Dunedin, New Zealand, and migrated to Australia in 1947. His paternal grandfather, John P. Joyce, was a career soldier who participated in the Gallipoli Campaign of World War I, including the landing at Anzac Cove. Joyce was raised in a Catholic family, as one of six children on a sheep and cattle property about 60 km (37 mi) north-east at Danglemah near Woolbrook.

Joyce attended Woolbrook Public School, boarded at Saint Ignatius' College, Riverview in Sydney, and graduated from the University of New England (UNE) Armidale with a Bachelor of Financial Administration in 1989.

Joyce met Natalie Abberfield at UNE. They married in 1993. After graduating, Joyce moved around northern New South Wales and Queensland as a farm worker, nightclub bouncer, and banker. From 1991 to 2005, Joyce worked in the accounting profession, and founded his own accountancy firm, Barnaby Joyce & Co., in St George, Queensland in 1999. He is a fellow of CPA Australia. From 1996 to 2001, Joyce served in the Royal Queensland Regiment of the Australian Army Reserve.

== Senator for Queensland (2005–2013) ==
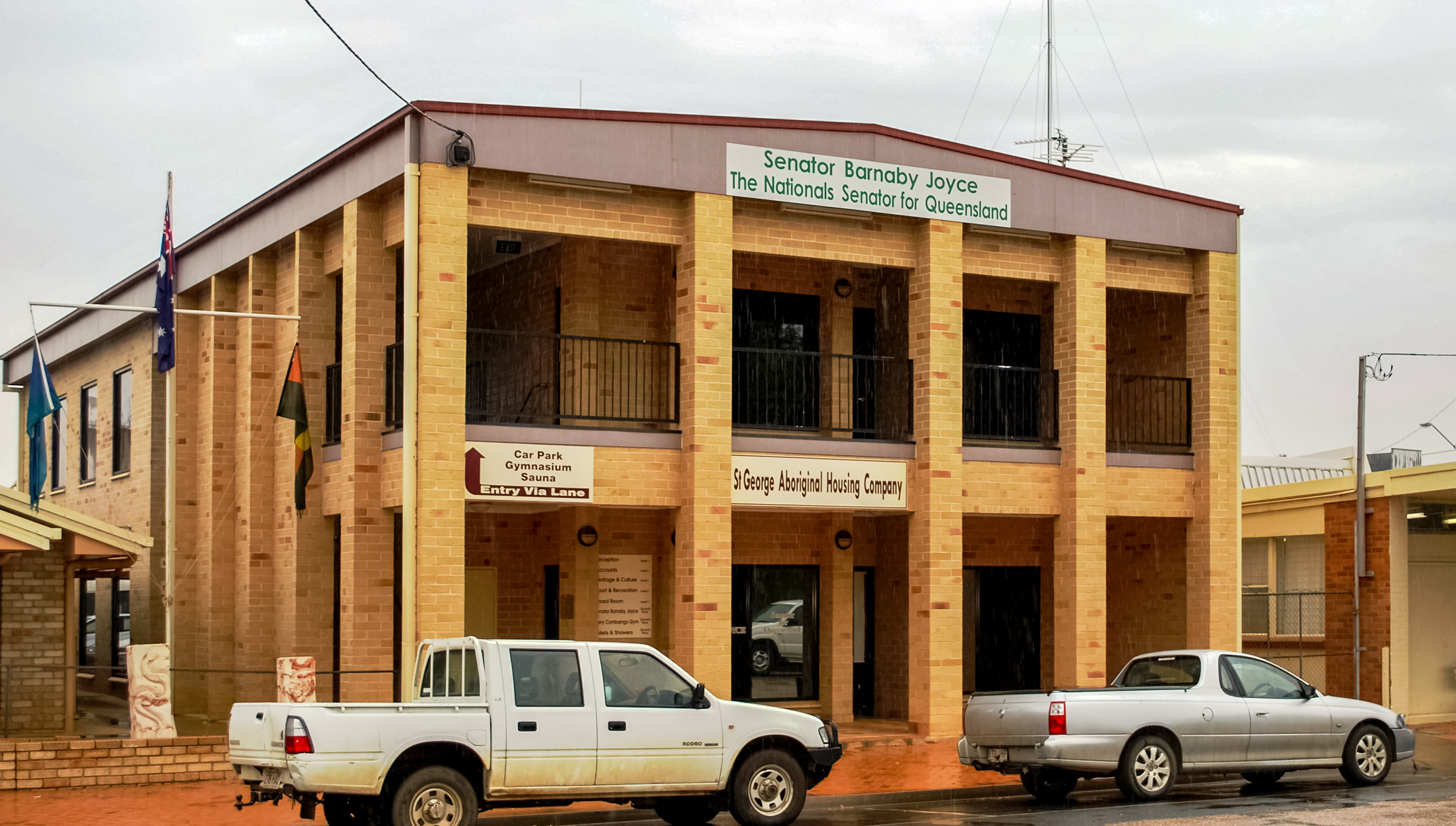
Barnaby Joyce's old office in St George

In the 2004 Australian federal election, Joyce was elected to the Senate representing Queensland and the National Party. His term ran from 1 July 2005 until 30 June 2011. He was re-elected at the 2010 election as a member of the Liberal National Party, which was formed by a merger of the Queensland divisions of the two non-Labor parties.

Before taking his seat in July 2005, Joyce said that the government should not take his support for granted. As a senator, he crossed the floor nineteen times during the term of the Howard government. Joyce initially expressed misgivings about the government's proposed sale of Telstra, the partially state-owned telecommunications company; nevertheless, Joyce voted in favour of the sale a few months later in September 2005. This led the Labor Party to label Joyce "Backdown Barney" and "Barnaby Rubble" in an acrimonious parliamentary debate. As the Telstra Sale Legislation had been pursued by the lower house in prior parliamentary sessions with no assistance package for regional Australia, Joyce was later credited with holding out until the multi-billion dollar assistance package was negotiated and delivered.

Joyce opposed the free provision of the Gardasil vaccine.

In May 2006, after a one-month visit to Antarctica as a member of the External Territories Committee, Joyce promoted mining there, banned under the Antarctic Treaty, and stated that other nations did not recognise Australia's 42 per cent claim over Antarctica. The proposal was roundly condemned by Federal Environment Minister Ian Campbell, Labor Opposition spokesman Anthony Albanese and others.

=== Crossing the floor ===
As a Senator, Joyce used the threat of crossing the floor to extract concessions from his own government on various issues, most notably in relation to the sale of Telstra. He crossed the floor 28 times and there was a perception that he was a "maverick" and someone not beholden to the Liberals. The They Vote For You website, which monitors the voting patterns of federal politicians, records that Joyce has "rebelled" against the party whip in 1.1% of divisions. The following table lists the legislation on which Joyce has crossed the floor, but does not include motions.

| Year | Legislation | Voting stance | Outcome of legislation | Citation |
|---|---|---|---|---|
| 2006 | Petroleum Retail Legislation Repeal Bill, 2006 | No | Passed | |
| 2006 | Trade Practices Legislation Amendment Bill (No. 1) 2005 | No | Passed | |
| 2006 | Tax Laws Amendment (2006 Measures No. 4) Bill 2006 | No | Passed | |

=== Leader of the Nationals in the Senate ===
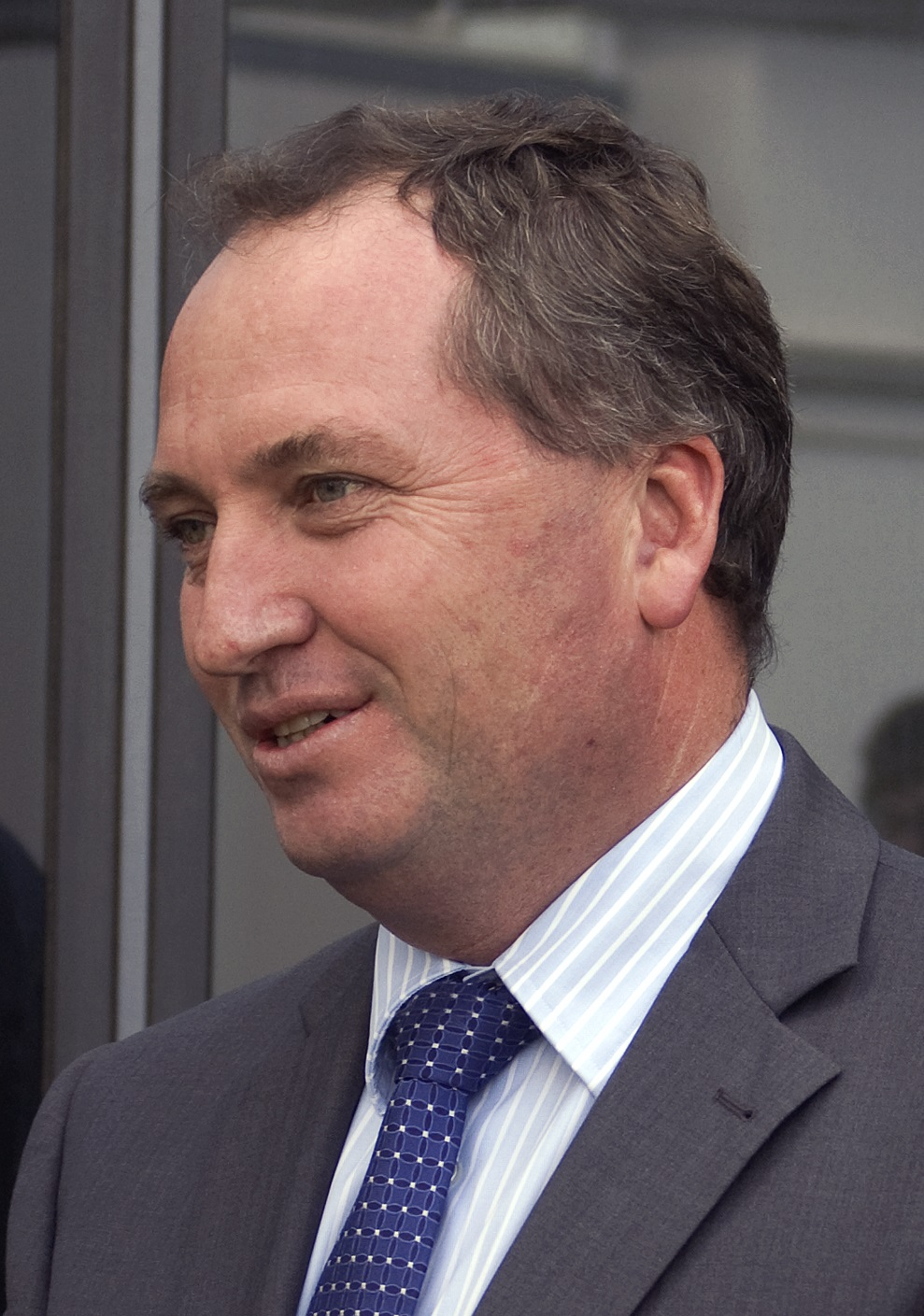
Joyce in 2010

In September 2008, after replacing Nigel Scullion as Leader of the Nationals in the Senate, Joyce stated that his party in the upper house would no longer necessarily vote with their Liberal counterparts in the upper house, which opened up another possible avenue for the Labor government to pass legislation. Joyce gained the majority support of the five Nationals (including one Country Liberal Party) senators through Fiona Nash and John Williams. The takeover was not expected nor revealed to the party until after it took place. Joyce remained leader of his party despite the Queensland divisions of the Liberal and National parties merging into the Liberal National Party of Queensland in July 2008.

In 2009, when then opposition leader Malcolm Turnbull decided that the Coalition would support the Rudd government's emissions trading scheme (ETS), Joyce as Nationals Senate leader helped trigger the rebellion within Coalition ranks against it.

The Coalition's issues with the ETS would lead to Turnbull being replaced as Liberal leader by Tony Abbott.

In February 2010, Joyce as shadow finance minister declared that Australia was "going to hock to our eyeballs to people overseas" and was "getting to a point where we can't repay it". This led to a response from the Governor of the Reserve Bank, Glenn Stevens, that he had "yet to meet a finance minister who has ever mused any possibility about debt default of his own country" and that there were "few things less likely than Australia defaulting on its sovereign debt".

Joyce's time as Shadow Finance Minister was fraught with difficulties which also infamously saw him confusing trillions with billions in his first appearance as Shadow Finance Minister at the National Press Club and became the source of ridicule by the Government.

There were calls from within the Coalition that Joyce be removed from the finance portfolio as they saw it as a distraction in their attacks on the government which was having problems with the insulation scheme.

Joyce lasted as Shadow Finance Minister for three months from December 2009 to March 2010 when Abbott moved him to Regional Development, Infrastructure and Water.

In the 2010 election Joyce was re-elected to parliament on the LNP ticket with senators George Brandis and Brett Mason, and Joyce got more below the line votes than above the line votes. He was reappointed to the Shadow Ministry with his portfolio renamed as Regional Development, Local Government and Water as well as remaining as leader of the Nationals in the Senate.

== Abbott and Turnbull governments (2013–2018) ==
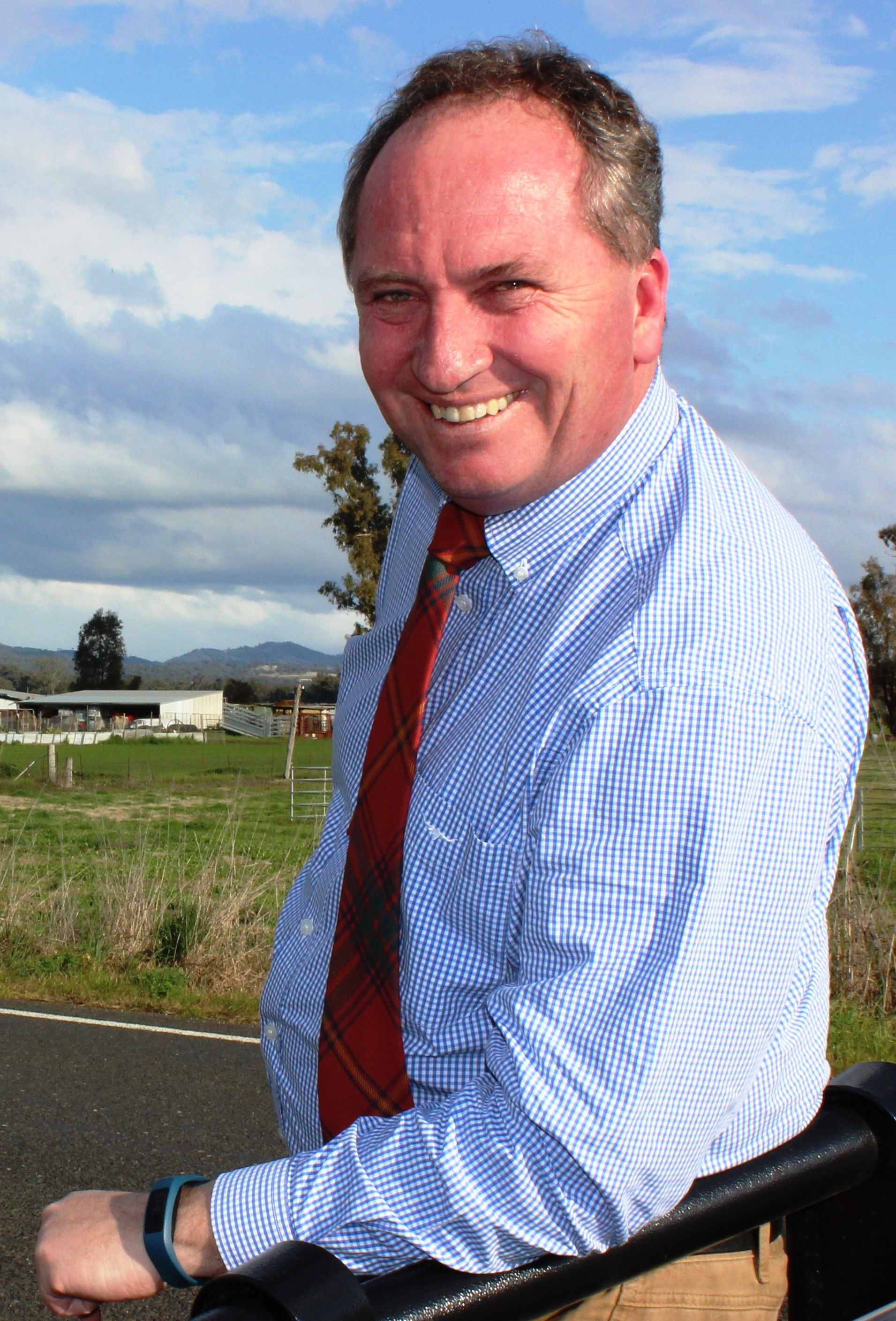
Joyce in 2014

=== Move to House of Representatives ===
In April 2013 Joyce won the Nationals preselection for the House of Representatives seat of New England in New South Wales for the September 2013 election. The seat was held on a margin of 21.52% by independent politician Tony Windsor, who had decided to retire. Independent state parliamentarian Richard Torbay had been preselected as National candidate in August 2012, but was pushed out due to concerns about his ownership of several Centrelink buildings and reports that he received secret donations from Labor interests to run against National candidates.

Joyce had expressed interest in transferring to the lower house for some time. He had initially mulled running in Maranoa, which included his home in St George, but this was brought undone when that seat's longtime member, Bruce Scott, refused to stand aside in his favour. When Torbay's candidacy imploded, the state Nationals felt chagrin at Joyce's renewed interest, even though he had been born in Tamworth and had spent much of his youth on both sides of the Tweed. They initially floated NSW Deputy Premier Andrew Stoner as a replacement for Torbay. Ultimately, however, Joyce faced little opposition in the preselection contest. He resigned from the Senate on 8 August 2013, and Barry O'Sullivan was selected to replace him in the Senate.

Joyce won the seat of New England with a margin of 21 points. He was the first person to win back both a Senate seat and a House of Representatives seat previously lost by the Coalition. The Nationals had held New England without interruption from 1922 until Windsor won the seat in 2001, and had been heavily tipped to regain it with Windsor's retirement. During Windsor's tenure, most calculations of "traditional" two-party matchups between the Nationals and Labor had shown it as a comfortably safe National seat. Joyce is one of only a handful of people to have represented multiple states in parliament, and the only person to have represented one state in the Senate and a different state in the House of Representatives.

By Windsor's account, Joyce revealed that if Windsor had contested the seat, rather than retired, Prime Minister Abbott's office was ready to finance a range of projects in the New England to aid Joyce's campaign (including $50 million for Armidale hospital); however, once there was no competition, all but $5 million was reallocated to other electorates.

=== Government minister (2013–2016) ===
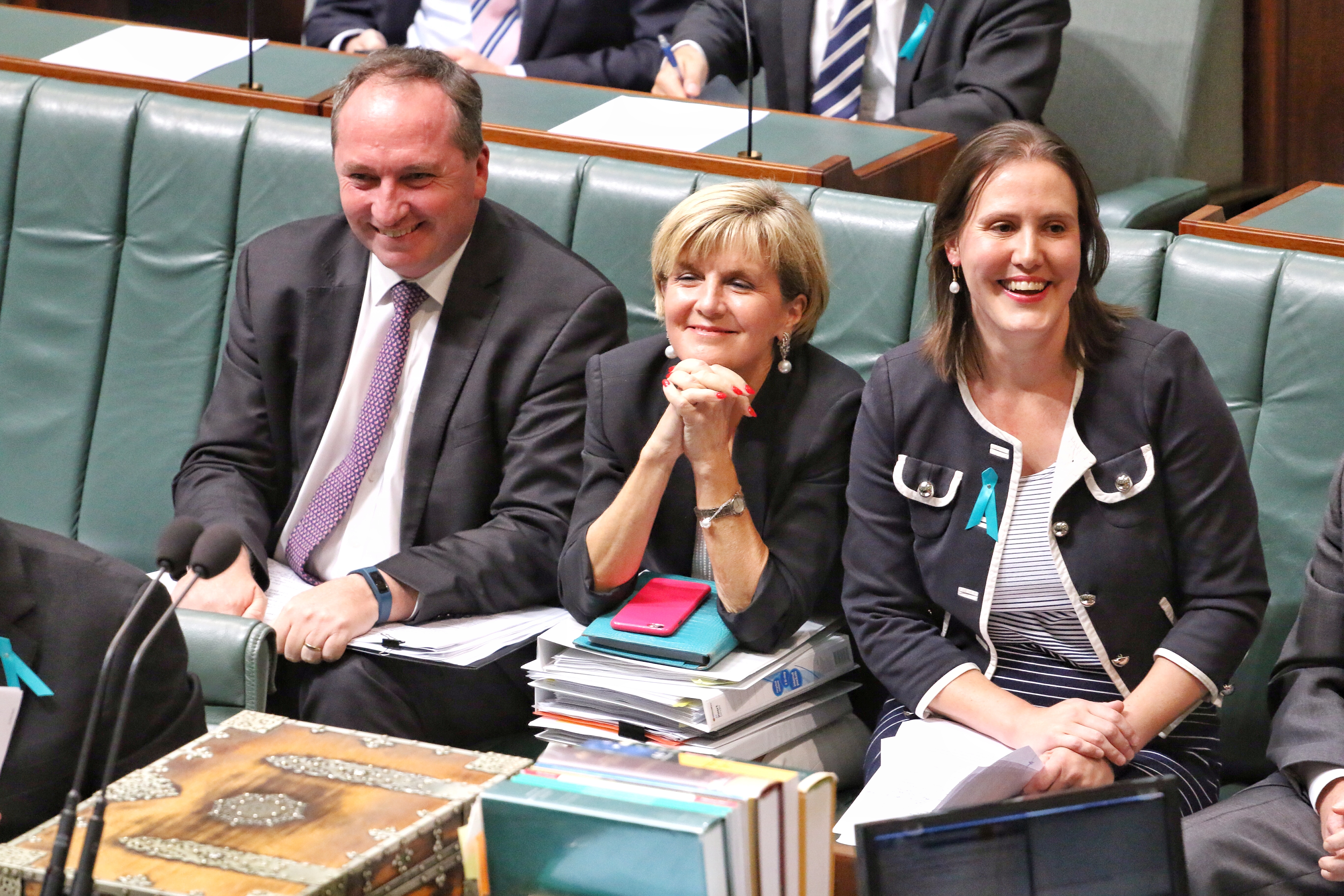
Joyce with Julie Bishop and Kelly O'Dwyer in 2016

Following the 2013 election, Joyce was elected deputy leader of the Nationals. On 18 September 2013, Joyce was sworn in as Minister for Agriculture. On 21 September 2015, this portfolio was expanded to include Water Resources in the First Turnbull Ministry.

In September 2015 Joyce gained international attention after warning actor Johnny Depp that his two pet dogs would be euthanised if not removed from Australia after being imported illegally.

At the 2016 election Joyce faced a challenge from Tony Windsor, who came out of retirement to contest. Seat-level polling in New England found Joyce and Windsor neck and neck, however Joyce won with a majority on the primary vote, enough to retain the seat without the need for preferences.

=== Deputy Prime Minister (2016–2018) ===
On 11 February 2016 Leader of the National Party, Warren Truss announced his intended retirement and Barnaby Joyce was elected unopposed as his replacement, with Fiona Nash as his deputy. Joyce was sworn in as Deputy Prime Minister of Australia on 18 February 2016. On 7 December 2017, Bridget McKenzie replaced Nash as deputy leader of the Nationals.

==== Constitutional eligibility ====
On 14 August 2017 Joyce became embroiled in the parliamentary eligibility crisis, announcing to the House of Representatives that he had received advice from the New Zealand High Commission that he could possibly hold New Zealand citizenship by descent from his father. Joyce asked the government to have him referred to the High Court in the Court of Disputed Returns for consideration and clarification of his eligibility alongside that of senators Ludlam, Waters, Canavan and Roberts. Later in the day, the New Zealand Department of Internal Affairs and the Crown Law Office confirmed that Joyce was indeed a New Zealand citizen. He quickly renounced his New Zealand citizenship. On 27 October 2017, the High Court ruled that Joyce had been ineligible to be a candidate for the House of Representatives at the time of the 2016 election, since he had been a dual citizen at that time, and that his election was therefore invalid. The ruling cast doubt on the validity of ministerial decisions made after August 2017. Following the crisis, Joyce was humorously nominated as the 2018 New Zealander of the Year, receiving the second highest number of votes.

On 2 December 2017 Joyce won the ensuing New England by-election with a healthy two-party swing of 7.5 percent, in the process winning almost two-thirds of the primary vote. He was sworn back into the House four days later, and on the same day was reappointed as Deputy Prime Minister as well as Minister for Agriculture and Water Resources. Prime Minister Turnbull had taken on that portfolio himself after Joyce was forced out of Parliament for the first time. On 20 December 2017, in a rearrangement of the Second Turnbull Ministry, Joyce was appointed as the Minister for Infrastructure and Transport.

During the by-election for New England, Gina Rinehart awarded Joyce the first "National Agricultural and Related Industries prize", worth $40,000. This was criticised by Labor, and Joyce's office later said that he would "politely decline" the money.

==== Extramarital affair ====
On 7 December 2017 Joyce announced that he had separated from his wife. On 6 February 2018, The Daily Telegraph reported that he was expecting a child with his former communications staffer Vikki Campion. Richard Di Natale of the Greens called on Joyce to resign for "clearly breaching the standards required of ministers". Prime Minister Malcolm Turnbull publicly called for Joyce to "consider his own position." This was as much as Turnbull could do under the Coalition agreement, which stipulates that the leader of the Nationals automatically becomes Deputy Prime Minister during periods of Coalition government. Turnbull could not have sacked Joyce unless he was deposed in a National leadership spill. However, Turnbull forced Joyce to go on a week of personal leave instead of acting as prime minister while Turnbull visited the United States. He also announced that the parliamentary code of conduct would be reworded to forbid sexual relationships between ministers and their staff. On 21 February, Turnbull ordered an investigation into whether Joyce had breached the ministerial code of conduct. As of May 2018, the investigation into Joyce's travel expenses was ongoing. In February 2018, Turnbull's office relied on a technicality in stating that Joyce had not breached the ministerial code of conduct when his lover was employed by fellow MPs, arguing Vikki Campion could not be considered the Deputy Prime Minister's "partner" at the time.

==== Alleged sexual harassment and resignation ====
The Nationals received a formal complaint alleging that Joyce had sexually harassed a Western Australian woman. Joyce's spokesman called the complaint "spurious and defamatory." On 23 February, Joyce announced that he would formally resign on 26 February as leader of the National Party, step down from his ministerial portfolios and move to the backbench. On resignation, Joyce lost his Deputy Prime Minister's and ministerial salaries of $416,000 a year, to receive a backbencher's salary of only about $200,000. Regional Development Minister John McVeigh became Acting Minister for Infrastructure and Transport. A leadership ballot within the National Party resulted in Michael McCormack becoming party leader and deputy prime minister. In September 2018, it was announced that the National Party's eight-month investigation into the allegations of sexual harassment had been unable to make a determination, and that the report would remain confidential.

== Morrison government (2018–2022) ==
In August 2018, shortly after Turnbull was replaced as prime minister by Scott Morrison, Joyce was appointed as special envoy for drought assistance and recovery by the new Morrison government. The position was abolished after the 2019 federal election, which saw the Coalition re-elected.

Joyce openly sought a return to the leadership of the National Party in 2018 and 2019. He was publicly critical of his successor Michael McCormack's leadership and the Nationals' perceived unwillingness to deviate from Liberal policy positions. He eventually mounted an unsuccessfully challenge against McCormack in February 2020, with the final vote tallies kept secret in accordance with party policy. Prior to the challenge he promised to "renegotiate a stronger Coalition agreement that would include more coal-fired power and a shake-up of the management of the Murray Darling basin".

=== Deputy Prime Minister (2021–2022) ===
Joyce returned as leader of the Nationals on 21 June 2021, following a further leadership spill. He was reappointed deputy prime minister the following day and also appointed Minister for Infrastructure, Transport and Regional Development. A week after his appointment, during the second COVID-19 lockdown in Sydney, he was fined $200 for not wearing a mask in breach of COVID-19 health orders.

In February 2022, it was revealed that Joyce sent a text in March 2021 labelling Morrison a "hypocrite and a liar." Joyce offered his resignation to Morrison after this became public, but the offer was rejected.

After the Coalition's defeat at the 2022 election, Joyce was challenged by his deputy David Littleproud and backbencher Darren Chester at a leadership spill on 30 May 2022. Joyce lost to Littleproud, ending his 11-month second term as party leader.

== Opposition and move to One Nation (2022–present) ==
Subsequently, Joyce became Shadow Minister for Veterans' Affairs in the Coalition shadow cabinet.

In September 2023, Joyce joined a cross-party delegation of Australian MPs to Washington, D.C., to lobby the U.S. Department of Justice to abandon its attempts to extradite Australian publisher Julian Assange from the United Kingdom. The other members were Alex Antic, Monique Ryan, David Shoebridge, Peter Whish-Wilson, and Tony Zappia.

In February 2024 Joyce was filmed lying on a Canberra footpath late at night after apparently falling off a planter box, and subsequently swearing into his phone. He later explained he had mixed medication with alcohol. There was pressure on the National Party to remove Joyce from the frontbench.

In July 2024 Joyce faced calls to resign as a Shadow Minister after he likened ballot papers to bullets at a protest against a wind farm in Lake Illawarra.

=== Return to the backbench ===
Following the 2025 election, Joyce was not appointed to a shadow cabinet position.

On 18 October 2025, Joyce announced that he would not contest his New England seat at the next election and that his relationship with the leadership of the Nationals had "irreparably broken down". This led to speculation that he would quit the Nationals and join One Nation, which increased when Joyce had a meal with Pauline Hanson in her office at Parliament House.

=== Move to the crossbench ===
On 27 November 2025, Joyce announced that he would resign from the National Party to sit as an independent MP. He stated that he had not yet made a decision on whether to join One Nation, but that he was "strongly considering it". He affirmed that he would not recontest his seat of New England at the next federal election.

On 8 December, Joyce formally announced he had joined One Nation. He is the second member of One Nation to sit in the House of Representatives in the party's history, after Hanson. (Note: Hanson won the seat of Oxley as a disendorsed Liberal Party candidate in 1996, founded One Nation in 1997, and lost the seat in 1998. George Christensen left the National Party to join One Nation one month before the 2022 election, but after parliament had been dissolved and his term as an MP had concluded.) In a statement, Joyce confirmed that he intended to run as a One Nation Senate candidate for New South Wales at the next election. In 2017, Joyce had said Australia would "go down the toilet", if it was run by One Nation.

In May 2026 it was revealed by The Guardian that Joyce and Pauline Hanson had billed taxpayers more than $3,000 to attend fundraising and donor events on board the luxury cruise ship The World, hosted by the mining billionaire and One Nation donor Gina Rinehart.

External videos
- 'Sit down!': Barnaby Joyce's dog interrupts serious interview | 7.30

In July 2026, Joyce received national and international attention when he yelled "sit down" at his dog during an interview with Sarah Ferguson on the ABC's 7.30 program. Following the outburst, Joyce apologised to Ferguson and said his dog was causing noise. Ferguson attempted to steer the conversation away from the dog, at which point Joyce threatened to leave the interview. Joyce's reaction was criticised by animal experts, noting that dogs generally do not understand yelling. Hanson defended Joyce, stating: "[t]hat's Barnaby." One Nation soon after began selling dog leashes inspired by the incident. Following the interview, Joyce's wife Vikki Campion wrote a Substack article criticising Ferguson and the ABC, and stated that 7.30 would be "banned" from filming on her property.

== Political positions ==
Joyce has been described as socially conservative and as a maverick.

=== Social issues ===
==== Abortion ====
Joyce is opposed to abortion, and in 2018 he lobbied NSW Nationals to vote against a bill to provide "safe zones" around the state's abortion clinics. Since 1 July 2018 within NSW, it is illegal to protest within 150 metres of an abortion service.

==== Medicinal cannabis ====
In June 2014 Joyce changed his views about medicinal cannabis and publicly supported calls for the introduction of a medicinal cannabis trial following a high-profile campaign led by a young man in his constituency who was at the time suffering from an aggressive form of terminal cancer. By 2018, medical cannabis was generally legalised across Australia.

==== LGBT rights ====
In August 2014 Joyce spoke out in opposition to same-sex marriage, attending several rallies on the matter in Canberra. In 2011, he lobbied against a bill proposed by senator Sarah Hanson-Young that would allow for same-sex couples to marry. On 9 December 2017, same-sex marriage was legalised in Australia.

In December 2018 Joyce said schools should be allowed to deny enrollment to transgender students.

In January 2025, Joyce said that Australia should copy an executive order signed by Donald Trump which stated that the United States federal government will only recognize two genders, male and female.

In August 2026, Joyce denounced comments made by a former Western Australian One Nation candidate that described homosexuality as a mental illness. Joyce went on to assert that One Nation was "one of the gayest parties in Australia" in response to claims that the party is homophobic, noting that the party has gay members such as Jason Virgo and James Ashby. Joyce's sentiment was described as an attempt to win the "pink vote".

==== Death penalty ====
In April 2015 Joyce called for a national debate on capital punishment in Australia, although he is personally opposed to the death penalty.

==== Refugee intake ====
In September 2015 Joyce was the first senior minister to call for the Australian Government to accept more Syrian refugees in response to the humanitarian crisis engulfing Turkey and Europe. However, his call to prioritise Christian refugees above those from other faiths drew criticism from some human rights observers.

In February 2026, Joyce argued for limiting migration to skilled workers, and preventing people who had committed crimes or who relied on welfare from entering the country. Joyce also stated in regards to immigrants who did not culturally assimilate: "[i]f you pine for where you came from and say, ‘I really want Australia to be just like the sh*thole I came from’, you go back there".

==== Parliamentary rules ====
After the birth of his son Sebastian in April 2018, Joyce advocated for changes to parliamentary rules to allow senators and MPs to hire their spouses or partners and relatives. When questioned, he denied this could be a conflict of interest. In December 2018, Joyce raised this issue again to no avail.

==== Burqa ban ====
Joyce is opposed to banning the burqa.

==== Immigration ====
In 2016, Joyce opposed One Nation's Muslim immigration ban policy.

=== Economic issues ===
==== Populism ====
Joyce has often angered economic rationalist parliamentary colleagues in the LNP Coalition by taking up a number of causes often labelled as populist; such as his support for the retention of a single-desk wheat export marketing system for Australian grain growers, drought assistance for primary producers, amendments to the Trade Practices Act 1974, and media reform regulations that aimed to strengthen the ability of small business to compete with multi-national corporations. When questioned on his views, Joyce stated "Maybe I'm an agrarian socialist."

==== Foreign investment in Australia ====
In March 2009, Joyce launched a privately funded advertising campaign to keep Rio Tinto local, attacking a bid by the Chinese government-owned resources company Chinalco, a bid which had also been heavily criticised by Legal & General in the United Kingdom.

Joyce has also opposed the sale of large Australian agricultural assets to foreign investors. In 2012, as the opposition spokesman for water, Joyce was vocal in his unsuccessful opposition to the sale of Cubbie Station to a consortium led by a Chinese State Owned Enterprise. In 2013, as Agriculture Minister, Joyce and his National Party colleagues strongly opposed the proposed sale of Australia's largest bulk grain handler GrainCorp to the American company Archer Daniels Midland. The then Liberal Treasurer, Joe Hockey, rejected the sale based on the hugely discretionary "National Interest" grounds which a Treasurer can use to block such transactions. Despite the reasons Hockey used to justify his decision, it was widely reported that the National Party demanded this outcome, with the Labor Shadow Treasurer Chris Bowen accusing the junior Coalition partner of "bullying" the Treasurer into arriving at this decision.

In 2015 Joyce voiced opposition to the sale of another large Australian asset to foreign buyers, this time S. Kidman & Co, which owned the largest combined landholdings in Australia, including the iconic Kidman Station. Most of the known interest came from Chinese companies, and Joyce was accused of xenophobia; claims which he rejected. In November 2015, the Treasurer, Scott Morrison decided that the sale of S. Kidman & Co to any foreign investor would not be approved based on national security grounds, due to part of the company being in the vicinity of the Woomera Prohibited Area, among other reasons. The Labor Shadow Agriculture spokesman Joel Fitzgibbon slammed the Government's decision as "political" and accused it of running a "discriminatory foreign investment regime".

==== Banking royal commission ====
When Joyce was leader of the Nationals and deputy prime minister, he repeatedly argued against a banking royal commission. After disturbing evidence emerged after hearings for the Royal Commission into Misconduct in the Banking, Superannuation and Financial Services Industry began in 2018, CPA Joyce said, as a backbencher, that he was wrong and naive in previously opposing a royal commission.

=== Environmental issues ===
==== Renewable energy ====
Joyce believes that renewable energy causes problems with energy supply. In January 2021, he called upon Zali Steggall, a prominent renewable energy advocate, to explain why renewable energy had allegedly led to power cuts in Manly and other Sydney suburbs, and followed up with "I don't have to win this argument the facts are doing it for me". Enquiries to Ausgrid showed that the outages were not due to renewable energy but to "unforeseen cable faults", and that there was no pressure on the grid when the outages occurred.

==== Biofouling ====
In 2015, Joyce received a Froggatt Award from the Invasive Species Council for taking "principled decisions" in regard to the decision to introduce mandatory biofouling rules to prevent marine pests entering Australia, and for acting quickly and decisively in expelling two dogs belonging to Johnny Depp and Amber Heard which had been brought into Australia in an apparent breach of Australia's strict quarantine laws.

In 2021 Heard announced she had named her new dog after Joyce, in reference to the previous controversy.

==== Global warming ====
During 2015 and 2016, Joyce strongly opposed major coal mining in the Liverpool Plains. In 2018, he joined the Monash Forum, a group of Liberal and National MPs who advocate for building new coal-fired power stations in Australia. Joyce has been seen as a global warming climate change denier, but in 2016 made comment about its possibility based on some of his own personal observations. In December 2019, he was reported as accepting that the climate was changing but insisting the solution was to respect God, rather than impose a tax to limit emissions. In July 2021, he was reported as saying that the push towards a 2050 net zero carbon emissions commitment is like being served "sautéed gherkins and sashimi tadpoles" at a restaurant, adding that he was "quite happy to consider the menu when you tell me what's on it and what it costs".

==== Murray–Darling basin ====
In 2016 Joyce supported reducing environmental water allocations in the Murray–Darling basin to reduce the impact on towns and people currently dependent on the rivers. This was contrary to a 2016 election promise by the government, and was widely criticised by environmental groups. In 2017, Joyce stated that the Commonwealth would not intervene regarding accusations of water theft in the basin.

==== Endangered species ====
In March 2017, Joyce called for Leadbeater's possum to be taken off the critically endangered species list to boost the logging of forest to maintain employment. Environmentalists believe that such action would be devastating for the possum and countered that Joyce was prepared to kill two dogs but not ensure the preservation of an entire species.

== Personal life ==
Joyce is a Roman Catholic. He met Natalie Abberfield while at university in Armidale, New South Wales. They married in 1993, and together had four daughters. Following his extramarital affair with political staffer Vikki Campion, Joyce announced in December 2017 that he and his wife had separated. Prime Minister Malcolm Turnbull said of the relationship, "Barnaby made a shocking error of judgement in having an affair with a young woman working in his office" and initiated a ban on ministers having sex with their staffers.

In February 2018, news reports confirmed that Joyce and Campion were expecting a child together; in April, Campion gave birth to a son. Joyce and Campion reportedly accepted $150,000 for an interview with Channel 7's Sunday Night program with the money going into a trust fund for the child. In 2019, a second son was born in Armidale. Joyce became engaged to Campion in January 2022, and they had a country-style wedding on 12 November 2023 at his family estate in Woolbrook, near Walcha.

In the National Rugby League (NRL), Joyce formerly supported the North Queensland Cowboys, but shifted his allegiance to the Newcastle Knights, according to a 2014 article on his website, citing the team's location just down the New England Highway from his electorate.

In May 2025, Joyce announced he will undergo surgery after being diagnosed with prostate cancer.

== Notes ==
Parliament of Australia
| Preceded by Len Harris | Senator for Queensland; 2005–2013 | Succeeded by Barry O'Sullivan |
| Preceded by Tony Windsor | Member for New England; 2013–2017, 2017–present | Incumbent |
Political offices
| Preceded by Joel Fitzgibbon as Minister for Agriculture, Fisheries and Forestry | Minister for Agriculture and Water Resources; 2013–2017 | Succeeded by David Littleproud |
| Preceded by Darren Chester | Minister for Infrastructure and Transport; 2017–2018 | Succeeded by Michael McCormack |
| Preceded by Warren Truss | Deputy Prime Minister of Australia; 2016–2017, 2017–2018 | Succeeded by Michael McCormack |
| Preceded by Michael McCormack | Minister for Infrastructure, Transport and Regional Development; 2021–2022 | Succeeded by Catherine King |
| Preceded by Michael McCormack | Deputy Prime Minister of Australia; 2021–2022 | Succeeded by Richard Marles |
Party political offices
| Preceded by Nigel Scullion | Leader of the National Party in the Senate; 2008–2013 | Succeeded by Nigel Scullion |
| Preceded by Nigel Scullion | Deputy Leader of the National Party; 2013–2016 | Succeeded by Fiona Nash |
| Preceded by Warren Truss | Leader of the National Party; 2016–2018 | Succeeded by Michael McCormack |
| Preceded by Michael McCormack | Leader of the National Party; 2021–2022 | Succeeded by David Littleproud |
