= Publishing House of Electronics Industry =

Scholarly book publisher

Publishing House of Electronics Industry (PHEI)
- Industry: Book publishing
- Headquarters: Huaxin Building, No. 288, Jinjia Village, South of Wanshou Road, Haidian District, Beijing
- Website: http://www.phei.com.cn/

The Publishing House of Electronics Industry (PHEI; simplified Chinese: 电子工业出版社; traditional Chinese: 電子工業出版社; pinyin: Diànzǐ Gōngyè Chūbǎnshè) was established in October 1982, and is now a leading comprehensive publisher under the Ministry of Industry and Information Technology of the People's Republic of China. It is strong in computer science, electronics engineering, telecommunications, information systems and industrial technologies, and publishes books, journals, multimedia products and online services.

== Publication ==
=== Books ===
The company publishes books in science and technology, education, economic management, as well as children's books and popular books, etc., both online and offline.

=== Journals ===
The journals include:

- 《产业经济评论》(Industrial Economic Review), Bimonthly, website
- 《中国信息化》(IChina), Monthly, website
- 《工信财经科技》(Finance and Technology of Industry and Information Technology), Bimonthly;
- 《数字通信世界》(Digital Communications World), Monthly, website
- 《探索科学》 (Science Discovering), Monthly;
- 《中国新通信》(China New Telecommunications) Semi-monthly， website
- 《工业和信息化教育》(Industrial and Information Technology Education)， Monthly, website

== International cooperation ==
PHEI keeps partnerships with more than 300 publishers all over the world, including Pearson Education, John Wiley & Sons, McGraw-Hill Education, Elsevier, Cengage Learning, Springer Nature. And more than 1,800 copyrights in nearly 20 languages have been exported in the areas of science and technology, economics and management and children's books, etc. PHEI's cooperation with Springer Nature started with the publication of two book series on 5G communications and the BeiDou Satellite Navigation System.

== Honors ==
PHEI has been awarded the "National Excellent Publisher", "Excellent Copyright Transfer Publisher" and "Excellent Distribution Publisher". And it is in the List of National First-Class Publishing Houses (Top 100 Book Publishing Units in China).

== See also ==
- Ministry of Industry and Information Technology of the People's Republic of China
