= Ministry of Industry and Information Technology =

People's Republic of China government ministry

- 中华人民共和国工业和信息化部
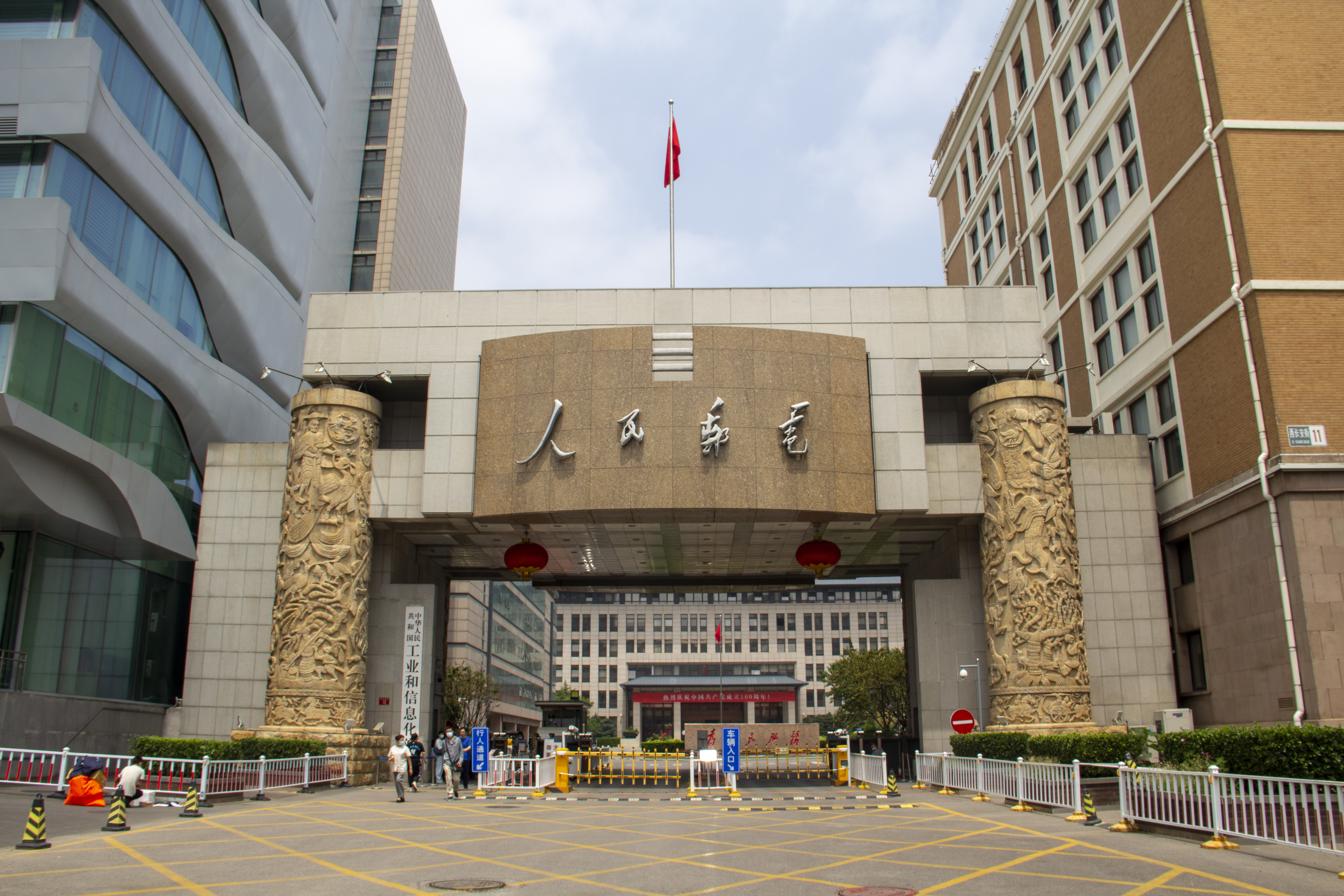

Agency overview
- Formed: March 2008; 18 years ago
- Superseding agency: Ministry of Information Industry
- Type: Constituent Department of the State Council (cabinet-level executive department)
- Jurisdiction: Government of China
- Headquarters: Beijing
- Minister responsible: Vacant
- Deputy Ministers responsible: Xin Guobin; Xiong Jijun; Ke Jixin; Shan Zhongde; Xie Yuansheng; Yu Xiaohui
- Agency executives: Ye Min, Leader of Discipline and Inspection & Supervision Team; Yao Laiying, Director of China Tobacco; Gao Dongsheng, Chief Economist; Zhong Zhihong, Chief Engineer; Wang Weiming, Chief Engineer
- Parent agency: State Council
- Child agencies: State Tobacco Monopoly Administration; State Administration of Science, Technology and Industry for National Defense; China National Space Administration; China Atomic Energy Authority; State Radio Regulation of China
- Website: www.miit.gov.cn

Ministry of Industry and Information Technology
- Simplified Chinese: 中华人民共和国工业和信息化部
- Traditional Chinese: 中華人民共和國工業和信息化部
Transcriptions
Standard Mandarin
- Hanyu Pinyin: Zhōnghuá Rénmín Gònghéguó Gōngyè Hé Xìnxīhuà Bù

Abbreviation
- Chinese: 工信部
Transcriptions
Standard Mandarin
- Hanyu Pinyin: Gōngxìn Bù

The Ministry of Industry and Information Technology (MIIT) is the sixth-ranked executive department of the State Council of the People's Republic of China. It is responsible for regulation and development of the postal service, Internet, wireless, broadcasting, communications, production of electronic and information goods, software industry and the promotion of the national knowledge economy.

== History ==
In 2004, the MIIT began the Connecting Every Village Project to promote universal access to telecommunication and internet services in rural China. The MIIT required that six state-owned companies, including the main telecommunications and internet providers China Mobile, China Unicom, and China Telecom, build the communications infrastructure and assist in financing the project. Beginning in late 2009, the program began building rural telecenters each of which had at least one telephone, computer, and internet connectivity. Approximately 90,000 rural telecenters were built by 2011. As of December 2019, 135 million rural households had used broadband internet. The program successfully extended internet infrastructure throughout rural China and promoted development of the internet.

The State Council announced during the 1st session of the 11th National People's Congress that the MIIT would supersede the Ministry of Information Industry (MII).

In 2013, the Ministry of Industry and Information Technology convened a group of scholars and technical experts to prepare a report about how China could become a manufacturing superpower; this report later developed into Made in China 2025. Later that year, the ministry's Made in China 2025 plan was approved by the State Council. It took over two years to draft by a working group of one hundred and fifty people. The plan's aim was to improve production efficiency and quality.

In summer 2021, MIIT began a six-month long regulatory campaign to address a variety of consumer protection and unfair competition issues, including interoperability concerns, in the consumer internet sector. It held meetings with executives from major Chinese tech companies and instructed them that their companies could no longer block external links to competitors.

== Functions ==
The ministry is responsible for industrial development, policy, and standards. It also oversees industry operations monitoring, innovation, and information technology and approves fixed-asset investment projects in industry, communications, and information technology.

MIIT has a major role in the development of digital information and communications technology and has some cybersecurity regulatory authority. It is involved in critical information infrastructure regulations, supervises cyberspace vulnerability databases, and the national vulnerabilities information sharing platform.

It is the government body primarily responsible for supervising product standards.

MIIT manages China's telecommunications equipment certification system.

In 2006, Human Rights Watch said that the ministry is responsible for overseeing technical implementation of the censorship in China.

MIIT delegates much of its legislative and standard setting work to the China Academy of Information and Communication Technology. The ministry is responsible for the current iteration of the Thousand Talents Plan called Qiming. MIIT has some regulatory overlap with the State Administration for Market Regulation (SAMR). Although MIIT does not have authority to enforce the Anti-Monopoly Law like SAMR does, it uses its departmental guidelines to address unfair competition issues. All apps provided in app stores require pre-approval from the ministry since 2023.

== Structure ==
According to the "Regulations on the Main Responsibilities of the Ministry of Industry and Information Technology, its Internal Organization and Staffing" and to the "Reply of the Office of the Central Institutional Establishment Committee on Matters Related to Further Clarifying the Main Responsibilities of the Ministry of Industry and Information Technology in Local Communications Administration Bureaus" (reply of the Central Organization Office [2012] No. 17), the Ministry of Industry and Information Technology has the following internal organization. Names in parentheses are alternative nameplates or subunits

=== Internal functional offices ===
- General Office (办公厅)
- Industrial Policy and Legislation Department (产业政策与法规司)
- Planning Department (规划司)
- Financial Department (财务司)
- Science and Technology Department (科技司)
- New Technologies Department (高新技术司)
- Operational Monitoring and Coordination Bureau (运行监测协调局)
- Medium and Small Enterprises Bureau (中小企业局)
- Energy Saving and Comprehensive Utilization Department (节能与综合利用 )
- Production Safety Department (安全生产司)（National Office of Implementation of the Chemical Weapons Convention — 国家履行《禁止化学武器公约》工作办公室）
- Raw Materials Industry Department (原材料工业司)（Rare Earths Office — 稀土办公室）
- Equipment Production First Department (装备工业一司)
- Equipment Production Second Department 装备工业二司（National Heavy Machinery Office — 国家重大技术装备办公室）
- Consumer Goods Industry Department (消费品工业司)
- Civil-Military Fusion Promotion Department (结合推进司)
- Electronic Communications Department (电子信息司)
- Communications Engineering Development Department (信息技术发展司)
- Information and Communication Development Bureau (信息通信发展司)
- Information and Communication Management Bureau (信息通信管理局)
- Internet Safety Management Bureau (网络安全管理局)
- Radio and EMS Management Bureau (无线电管理局)（National Radio Office — 国家无线电办公室）
- International Cooperation Department (国际合作司)（Hong Kong, Macao and Taiwan Office — 港澳台办公室）
- Personnel and Training Department (人事教育司)
- Party Committees (机关党委)（巡视工作办公室）
- Retired Cadres Bureau (离退休干部局)
- Internal Service Center (机关服务局)

=== National bureaus managed by MIIT ===
- State Administration of Science, Technology and Industry for National Defense (国家国防科技工业局)（Sub-ministerial level）
- State Tobacco Monopoly Bureau (国家烟草专卖局)（Sub-ministerial level）

=== External nameplates used by MIIT ===
- China National Space Administration (国家航天局)（Sub-ministerial level）
- China Atomic Energy Authority (国家原子能机构)（Sub-ministerial level)

=== Regional units ===
- Beijing Municipal Communications Administration (北京市通信管理局)
- Shanghai Municipal Communications Administration (上海市通信管理局)
- Tianjin Municipal Communications Administration (天津市通信管理局)
- Chongqing Municipal Communications Administration (重庆市通信管理局)
- Hebei Provincial Communications Administration (河北省通信管理局)
- Shanxi Provincial Communications Administration (山西省通信管理局)
- Jilin Provincial Communications Administration (吉林省通信管理局)
- Liaoning Provincial Communications Administration (辽宁省通信管理局)
- Heilongjiang Provincial Communications Administration (黑龙江省通信管理局)
- Shaanxi Provincial Communications Administration (陕西省通信管理局)
- Gansu Provincial Communications Administration (甘肃省通信管理局)
- Qinghai Provincial Communications Administration (青海省通信管理局)
- Shandong Provincial Communications Administration (山东省通信管理局)
- Fujian Provincial Communications Administration (福建省通信管理局)
- Zhejiang Provincial Communications Administration (浙江省通信管理局)
- Henan Provincial Communications Administration (河南省通信管理局)
- Hubei Provincial Communications Administration (湖北省通信管理局)
- Hunan Provincial Communications Administration (湖南省通信管理局)
- Jiangxi Provincial Communications Administration (江西省通信管理局)
- Jiangsu Provincial Communications Administration (江苏省通信管理局)
- Anhui Provincial Communications Administration (安徽省通信管理局)
- Guangdong Provincial Communications Administration (广东省通信管理局)
- Hainan Provincial Communications Administration (海南省通信管理局)
- Sichuan Provincial Communications Administration (四川省通信管理局)
- Guizhou Provincial Communications Administration (贵州省通信管理局)
- Yunnan Provincial Communications Administration (云南省通信管理局)
- Inner Mongolia Autonomous Region Communications Administration (内蒙古自治区通信管理局)
- Xinjiang Autonomous Region Communications Administration (新疆维吾尔自治区通信管理局)
- Ningxia Autonomous Region Communications Administration (宁夏回族自治区通信管理局)
- Guangxi Autonomous Region Communications Administration (广西壮族自治区通信管理局)
- Tibet Autonomous Region Communications Administration (西藏自治区通信管理局)

=== Directly subordinate units ===
- China Academy of Information and Communications Technology (中国信息通信研究院)
- China Center for Information Industry Development (中国电子信息产业发展研究院)（MIIT Third Electronics Laboratory — 工业和信息化部电子第三研究所）
- National Industrial Information Security Development Research Center (国家工业信息安全发展研究中心)（MIIT First Electronics Laboratory—工业和信息化部电子第一研究所）
- China Electronics Industry Standardization Research Institute (中国电子技术标准化研究院)（MIIT Fourth Electronics Laboratory — 工业和信息化部电子第四研究院）
- Electronic Product Reliability and Environmental Testing Laboratory (中国电子产品可靠性与环境试验研究所)（China Saibao Laboratory —中国赛宝实验室）
- China Industry Internet Research Institute (中国工业互联网研究院)
- State Radio Monitoring Center/State Radio Regulation of China (国家无线电监测中心)
- China National Tendering Center of Machinery & Electronic Equipment (中国机电招标中心)（MIIT Government Procurement Center — 信息化部政府采购中心)
- China Internet Network Information Center (中国互联网络信息中心)
- MIIT Information Center (工业和信息化部新闻宣传中心) (People's Post and Telecommunications Daily Publishing House — 人民邮电报社)
- China Center for the Promotion of SME Development (中国中小企业发展促进中心)
- Torch Hi-Tech Industry Development Center (火炬高技术产业开发中心)
- National Industrial Information Security Development Research Center (网络安全产业发展中心 - 信息中心）
- Emergency Communications Assurance Center (应急通信保障中心)
- Industry Development Promotion Center (产业发展促进中心)
- Equipment Industry Development Center (装备工业发展中心)
- Center for International Economic and Technological Cooperation (国际经济技术合作中心)（China Council for the Promotion of International Trade, Electronics & Information Industry Sub-Council — 中国国际贸易促进委员会电子信息行业分会）
- MIIT Talent Exchange Center ( 人才交流中心)
- MIIT Education and Examination Center (教育与考试中心)
- Industrial Culture Development Center of MIIT (工业文化发展中心)
- Communication Clearing Center (通信清算中心)
- Weihai Electronics and Information Technology Comprehensive Research Center (威海电子信息技术综合研究中心)
- China Software Testing Center (中国软件评测中心)（工业和信息化部软件与集成电路促进中心，中国电子信息产业发展研究院代管）

==== Directly Subordinate High-level Academic Institutions ====
- Beihang University (北京航空航天大学) (Note: These are "Vice-ministerial universities", in which the Principal and the Party Secretary have vice-ministerial rank and they are directly appointed or removed by the Central Committee of the CCP.)
- Beijing Institute of Technology (北京理工大学)
- Harbin Institute of Technology (哈尔滨工业大学)
- Northwestern Polytechnical University 西北工业大学
- Nanjing University of Aeronautics and Astronautics (南京航空航天大学)
- Nanjing University of Science and Technology (南京理工大学)
- Harbin Engineering University (哈尔滨工程大学)

=== Directly subordinate SOEs ===
- China Industry and Information Technology Publishing and Media Group (中国工信出版传媒集团有限责任公司)

=== Attached civil society associations ===
- China Institute of Communications (中国通信学会)
- Chinese Institute of Electronics (中国电子学会)
- Internet Society of China (中国互联网协会)

=== Subordinate units ===
The ministry administers the State Administration of Science, Technology and Industry for National Defense, and the State Tobacco Monopoly Bureau. The MIIT was historically responsible for the regulation and control of tobacco consumption, including the implementation of the WHO Framework Convention on Tobacco Control, a rather obvious case of conflict of interest. This task has since been reassigned to the National Health Commission as part of a large-scale government reform in 2018.

Under the arrangement one institution with two names, the MIIT reserves the external brands of the China National Space Administration and the China Atomic Energy Authority, although the level of control the ministry have over these two organizations is unclear. The MIIT oversees the China Academy of Information and Communications Technology, a government think tank that focuses on telecommunications and the digital economy. It also oversees seven universities, including top universities such as the Beijing University of Aeronautics and Astronautics, the Beijing Institute of Technology, the Harbin Institute of Technology, and the Northwestern Polytechnical University. The MIIT also co-manages the China Integrated Circuit Industry Investment Fund, used by the government to invest in semiconductor companies, together with the Ministry of Finance.

=== List of CCP committee secretaries ===
No.	Name	Took office	Left office	Ref.
Ministry of Industry and Information Technology
1	Li Yizhong	March 2008	December 2010	
2	Miao Wei	December 2010	July 2020	
3	Xiao Yaqing	July 2020	July 2022	
4	Jin Zhuanglong	July 2022	February 2025	
5	Li Lecheng	February 2025	6 November 2026	

== See also ==
- List of telecommunications regulatory bodies
- China Electronics Technology Group
- China Software Industry Association
- Electronic information industry in China
- Industry of China
- Software industry in China
- Standardization Administration of China SAC
- Roscomnadzor
- Publishing House of Electronics Industry
