= Division of Hindmarsh =

Australian federal electoral division

Coordinates: 34.936°S 138.528°E

Hindmarsh Australian House of Representatives Division
- Interactive map of boundaries since the 2019 federal election
- Created: 1903
- MP: Mark Butler
- Party: Labor
- Namesake: Sir John Hindmarsh
- Electors: 131,434 (2025)
- Area: 122 km^{2} (47.1 sq mi)
- Demographic: Inner metropolitan
Electorates around Hindmarsh:
Gulf St Vincent	Spence	Makin
Gulf St Vincent	Hindmarsh	Adelaide
Gulf St Vincent	Boothby	Boothby

The Division of Hindmarsh is an Australian Electoral Division in South Australia covering the north western and western coastal suburbs of Adelaide. The division was one of the seven established when the former Division of South Australia was split on 2 October 1903, and was first contested at the 1903 election, though now on slightly different boundaries. The Division is named after Sir John Hindmarsh, who was Governor of South Australia from 1836 to 1838. Since the 2019 Australian federal election The Division of Hindmarsh consists of part of the City of Charles Sturt, part of the City of Port Adelaide Enfield, and part of the City of West Torrens.

== Geography ==
The 122 km^{2} seat extends from the coast in the west to South Road in the east, covering the suburbs of Ascot Park, Brooklyn Park, Edwardstown, Fulham, Glenelg, Grange, Henley Beach, Kidman Park, Kurralta Park, Morphettville, Plympton, Richmond, Semaphore Park, Torrensville, West Beach and West Lakes. The Adelaide International Airport was centrally located in the electorate, making noise pollution a prominent local issue, besides the aged care needs of the relatively elderly population − the seat has one of Australia's highest proportions of citizens over the age of 65.

== History (1903–1993) ==
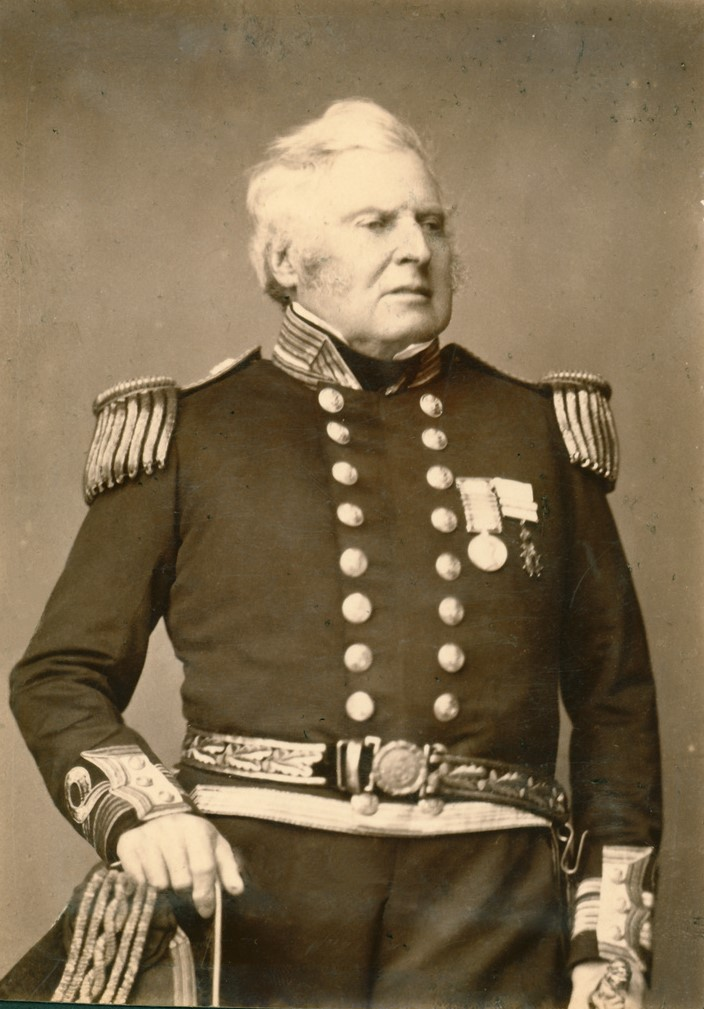
Sir John Hindmarsh, the division's namesake

The Division was one of the seven established when the multi-member Division of South Australia was redistributed into single-member seats on 2 October 1903. The Division comprised the South Australian House of Assembly District of Port Adelaide, with the addition of Goodwood from the District of Torrens. There were 13 Polling Places for the 1903 Australian federal election located within the Division — Port Adelaide, Lefevre's Peninsula, Alberton, Rosewater, Woodville, York, Hindmarsh, Thebarton, Hilton, Henley Beach, Plympton, Goodwood and Grand Junction.

The Division together with the seats of Adelaide and Boothby covered the metropolitan area of Adelaide until 1949. The south-east state border rural seat of Barker was then considered a "hybrid urban-rural" seat, stretching all the way from the southern tip of South Australia at least as far as Glenelg and the Holdfast Bay area, and at times even stretched as far as the western metropolitan suburbs of Keswick and Henley Beach.

Redistributions from the late 1940s onward have moved Hindmarsh clear of its initial boundaries over time to include increasingly wealthy seaside suburbs in and around Glenelg and the Holdfast Bay area to the south. Though initially based on the greater Port Adelaide area to the north of the present boundary this locality was now represented by the Division of Port Adelaide which was created in 1949 following an increase in the Australian House of Representatives from 74 to 121 seats.

After 1949 some of the area had variously been covered by Boothby, Kingston and now-abolished Hawker which was created in 1969. The present Hindmarsh has changed little geographically since neighbouring Division of Hawker was abolished in 1993, though the north-western coastal strip was added from 2004.

Since 1984, federal electoral division boundaries in Australia have been determined at redistributions by a redistribution committee appointed by the Australian Electoral Commission. Redistributions occur for the boundaries of divisions in a particular state, and they occur every seven years, or sooner if a state's representation entitlement changes or when divisions of a state are malapportioned.

A redistribution ahead of the 1984 election made Hindmarsh far less safe for Labor. From then on, successive redistributions gradually gave it a voting pattern similar to mortgage belt seats, which tend to be fairly marginal. Though now a marginal seat, for nearly a century it had been one of the safest Labor seats in the country, and was in Labor hands for all but three years from the 1903 election to the 1993 election. As a measure of the strength of Labor support at the time, it was the only seat in the state won by Labor in the massive United Australia Party landslide of 1931, with Labor incumbent Norman Makin winning enough primary votes to retain the seat outright. One of the few times that Labor's hold on the seat was seriously threatened in this time came in 1966, when the Labor margin was pared down to 1.7 percent after a 20% swing. Even then, sitting member Clyde Cameron still won enough primary votes to retain the seat outright. Hindmarsh had long been dominated by working-class families and aged pensioners. Progressive boundary redistributions over many decades transformed Hindmarsh from a safe Labor seat in to a marginal seat often won by the government of the day.

== Prominent members ==
Prominent members for the electorate have included Norman Makin, who was Speaker in the Scullin government, and a cabinet minister in the Curtin and Chifley governments, and Clyde Cameron, who was a cabinet minister in the Whitlam government.

== Elections 1993–2016 ==
Labor's hold on the seat became even more tenuous in the redistribution prior to the 1993 election when it absorbed most of the area around Holdfast Bay that had previously been in abolished Hawker. This reduced Labor's two-party margin from an already marginal 5.3 percent to a paper-thin one percent. Combined with state-level anger at the time stemming from the State Bank Collapse, this was enough for Liberal Chris Gallus, previously the member for Hawker, to win the seat in 1993 with a one percent two-party margin from a two percent two-party swing, becoming only the second non-Labor MP ever to win it. She seemingly consolidated her hold on the seat at the 1996 election amid her party's large victory that year, increasing her margin to 8.1 percent – easily the strongest result for a non-Labor candidate in the seat's history.

Gallus fended off spirited challenges from Labor's Steve Georganas at both the 1998 election and 2001 election, winning each time with a margin of less than two percent. When Gallus retired at the 2004 election, Georganas won the seat on a razor-thin 0.06 percent two-party margin from a one percent two-party swing, defeating Liberal candidate Simon Birmingham.

Georganas substantially increased his two-party margin above five percent at both the 2007 election and the 2010 election. Though Georganas was thought to have built up a base with the substantial Greek community in Hindmarsh (he is himself of Greek descent), he was defeated at the 2013 election when Liberal Matt Williams won the seat with a 1.89 percent margin from a 7.97 percent two-party-preferred swing. He became its third non-Labor member, and the first to oust a sitting Labor MP in the seat. The only South Australian seat to change hands in 2013, Hindmarsh became the most marginal seat in South Australia, and the only marginal Liberal seat in the state, only to be won back by Georganas for Labor at the 2016 election.

Being the only South Australian seat changing hands and won by the incoming government in 2013, coupled with being the only South Australian seat changing hands in 2016 aside from Mayo, underscored the marginal seat volatility of present-day Hindmarsh. Not a bellwether electorate however, ABC psephologist Antony Green listed the nearby Division of Makin as one of eleven seats throughout Australia which he classed as bellwethers in his 2016 pre-election guide, and was the only bellwether outside of New South Wales and Queensland.

== 2016 election ==
South Australian Senator Nick Xenophon confirmed in December 2014 that by mid-2015 the Nick Xenophon Team (NXT) party would announce candidates in the South Australian Liberal seats of Hindmarsh, Sturt and Mayo, along with seats in all states and territories at the 2016 federal election, with Xenophon citing the government's ambiguity on the Collins-class submarine replacement project as motivation. ABC psephologist Antony Green's 2016 federal election guide for South Australia stated NXT had a "strong chance of winning lower house seats and three or four Senate seats". The NXT candidate in Hindmarsh was Daniel Kirk.

Going into the 2016 election with a slender 1.9 percent two-party Liberal margin, Hindmarsh was the most marginal seat in South Australia, the government's only marginal seat in South Australia, the Coalition's only gain at the 2013 election in South Australia, and was the sixth most marginal Coalition-held seat in the nation. Georganas sought to retake the seat from Williams. A Galaxy seat-level opinion poll of over 500 voters in Hindmarsh conducted a week out from the Saturday 2 July election indicated a knife-edge 50–50 two-party vote. Ultimately, NXT preferences allowed Georganas to reclaim Hindmarsh for Labor with a two-party margin of just 0.6 percent, representing a two-party swing of 2.5 percent. Though slender, Georganas was first elected to Hindmarsh at the 2004 election with a two-party margin of just 0.06 percent.

== 2018 redistribution and 2019 election ==
Hindmarsh's character was significantly altered in a redistribution ahead of the 2019 federal election. Neighbouring Port Adelaide was abolished, with the bulk of its territory transferred to Hindmarsh; as mentioned above, Hindmarsh had been based on Port Adelaide for much of the first half-century after Federation. At the same time, the Holdfast Bay area was transferred to Boothby. This had the effect of making Labor's hold on Hindmarsh much more secure; on the new boundaries, Labor's margin increased from 0.6 percent to a notional 8.2 percent. At the 2019 federal election, Georgeanas contested the neighbouring seat of Adelaide where Labor incumbent Kate Ellis was retiring, to allow the former member for Port Adelaide, Mark Butler, to follow most of his constituents into the changed Hindmarsh.

== Members ==
Image	Member	Party	Term	Notes
	James Hutchison (1859–1909)	Labor	16 December 1903 – 6 December 1909	Previously held the South Australian House of Assembly seat of East Adelaide. Served as minister under Fisher. Died in office
	William Archibald (1850–1926)	Labor	13 April 1910 – 14 November 1916	Previously held the South Australian House of Assembly seat of Port Adelaide. Served as minister under Fisher and Hughes. Lost seat
	William Archibald (1850–1926)	National Labor	14 November 1916 – 17 February 1917	Previously held the South Australian House of Assembly seat of Port Adelaide. Served as minister under Fisher and Hughes. Lost seat
	William Archibald (1850–1926)	Nationalist	17 February 1917 – 13 December 1919	Previously held the South Australian House of Assembly seat of Port Adelaide. Served as minister under Fisher and Hughes. Lost seat
	Norman Makin (1889–1982)	Labor	13 December 1919 – 14 August 1946	Served as Speaker during the Scullin Government. Served as minister under Curtin, Forde and Chifley. Retired. Later elected to the Division of Sturt in 1954
	Albert Thompson (1886–1966)	Labor	28 September 1946 – 10 December 1949	Previously held the South Australian House of Assembly seat of Semaphore. Transferred to the Division of Port Adelaide
	Clyde Cameron (1913–2008)	Labor	10 December 1949 – 19 September 1980	Served as minister under Whitlam. Retired
	John Scott (1934–)	Labor	18 October 1980 – 8 February 1993	Retired
	Chris Gallus (1943–)	Liberal	13 March 1993 – 31 August 2004	Previously held the Division of Hawker. Retired
	Steve Georganas (1959–)	Labor	9 October 2004 – 7 September 2013	Lost seat
	Matt Williams (1973–)	Liberal	7 September 2013 – 2 July 2016	Lost seat
	Steve Georganas (1959–)	Labor	2 July 2016 – 11 April 2019	Transferred to the Division of Adelaide
	Mark Butler (1970–)	Labor	18 May 2019 – present	Previously held the Division of Port Adelaide. Incumbent. Currently a minister under Albanese

== Election results ==
2025 Australian federal election: Hindmarsh
Party	Candidate	Votes	%	±%
Labor	Mark Butler	54,145	48.14	+5.96
Liberal	Chris Lehmann	25,984	23.10	−9.59
Greens	Matthew Wright	15,246	13.56	−0.31
One Nation	Rocco Deangelis	5,594	4.97	+1.04
Trumpet of Patriots	Andrew Townsend	4,782	4.25	+3.66
Family First	Alex Tennikoff	2,646	2.35	+2.35
Independent	Jake Hall-Evans	1,786	1.59	+1.59
Animal Justice	Matt Pastro	1,565	1.39	−0.73
Fusion	Adrien Aloe	723	0.64	+0.64
Total formal votes		112,471	93.65	−0.64
Informal votes		7,624	6.35	+0.64
Turnout		120,095	91.41	+0.43
Two-party-preferred result
Labor	Mark Butler	74,623	66.35	+7.40
Liberal	Chris Lehmann	37,848	33.65	−7.40
Labor hold		Swing	+7.40	
