= Miao Wei =

Chinese manufacturing executive and politician

- 苗圩
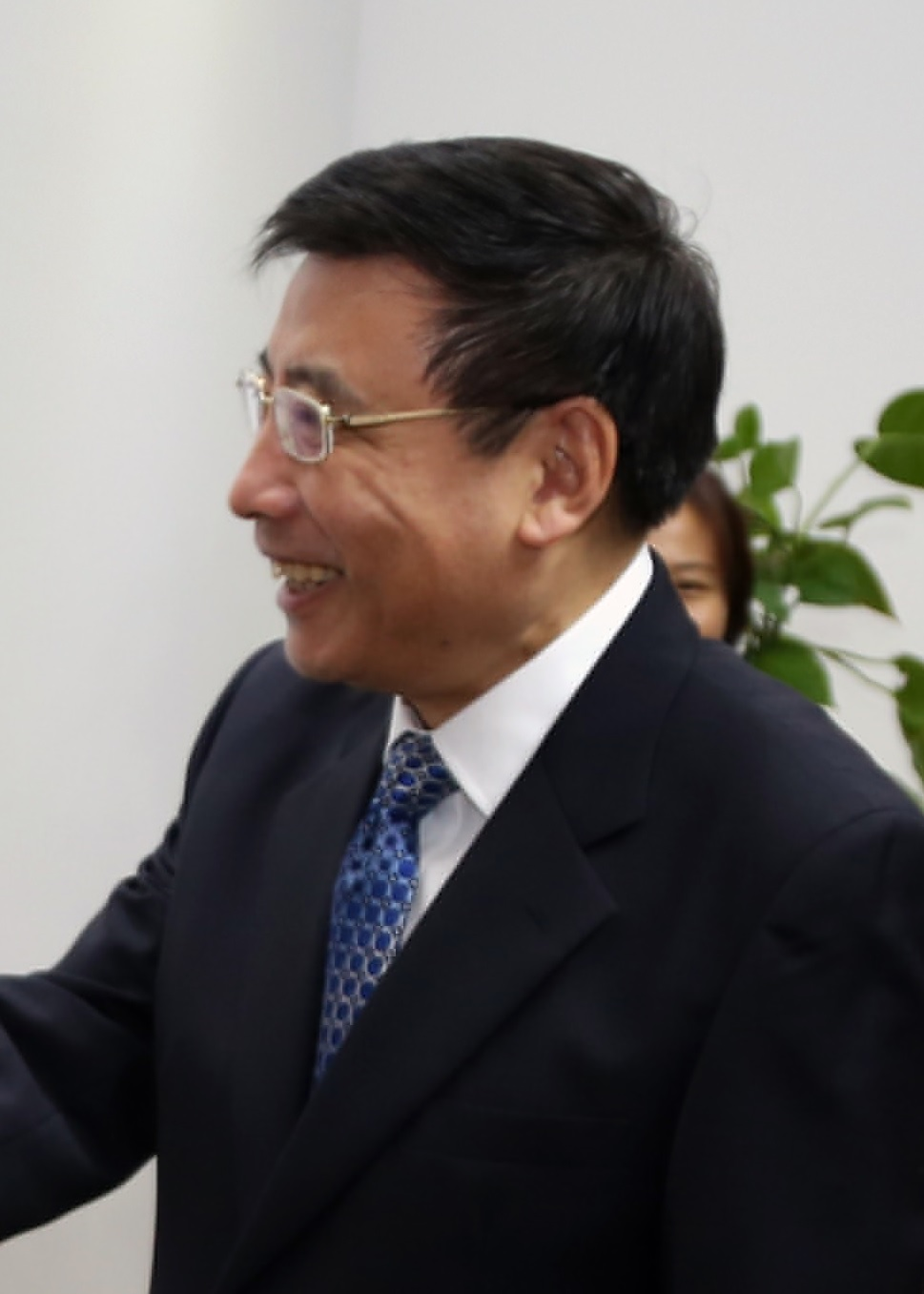
- Miao in September 2017

Minister of Industry and Information Technology
- In office December 2010 – 11 August 2020
- Premier: Wen Jiabao; Li Keqiang
- Preceded by: Li Yizhong
- Succeeded by: Xiao Yaqing

Party Secretary of Wuhan
- In office May 2005 – March 2008
- Preceded by: Chen Xunqiu
- Succeeded by: Yang Song

Personal details
- Born: May 1955 (age 71) Changli County, Hebei, China
- Party: Chinese Communist Party
- Education: Hefei University of Technology; Central Party School
- Occupation: Manufacturing executive, politician
- Profession: Industrial engineer

Miao Wei (Chinese: 苗圩; pinyin: Miáo Wéi; born May 1955) is a Chinese manufacturing executive and politician. He was the Minister of Industry and Information Technology until August 2020 and as well as the former Communist Party Chief of Wuhan, capital of Hubei province. Prior to that Miao was President of Dongfeng Motor, China's then second biggest carmaker. He was credited with rescuing Dongfeng from near bankruptcy and turning it into a profitable company.

== Career ==
Miao Wei is a native of Beijing. Beginning to 1974 he worked as a rusticated youth in rural Feixi County of Anhui province. After the Cultural Revolution he was admitted to Hefei University of Technology in 1978, where he studied at the department of the industrial engineering, graduating in 1982. He joined the Chinese Communist Party in September 1984.

After college, Miao worked for the China Auto Import-Export Corporation for ten years. By the age of 30 he was deputy manager for the company's sales division as well as the manufacturing division. In 1993 he was transferred to the then First Ministry of Machine-Building Industry, where he was the Deputy Director of the Automobile Department until 1995 and Assistant General Engineer for the next two years.

In September 1997 the central government transferred Miao to the government-owned Dongfeng Motor Corporation to lead its turnaround effort. Then China's second-biggest carmaker, Dongfeng had 120,000 employees and lost over 500 million yuan in 1998. Miao implemented radical reforms at Dongfeng, adopting Western management methodology and establishing alliances with foreign carmakers Nissan and PSA Peugeot Citroën. The company turned a profit within two years, and by 2003 its profits had rocketed to 6.1 billion yuan. In 2004 BusinessWeek nominated Miao Wei as a "Star of Asia" for "transform[ing] Dongfeng from an almost bankrupt military truck maker into a profitable manufacturer of both trucks and passenger cars."

In May 2005 Miao Wei was appointed the Communist Party Chief of Wuhan, capital of Hubei province and where Dongfeng is headquartered. He was also made a member of the Hubei Provincial Committee of the Communist Party.

In March 2008 Miao was transferred to the central government to serve as Vice Minister of Industry and Information Technology, and was promoted to Minister in December 2010, replacing Li Yizhong.

Miao was an alternate of the 17th Central Committee of the Chinese Communist Party, and is a full member of the 18th Central Committee.

Business positions
Preceded by Ma Yue	General Manager of Dongfeng Motor Corporation; 1999–2005	Succeeded by Xu Ping
Party political offices
Preceded by Chen Xunqiu	Communist Party Secretary of Wuhan; 2005–2008	Succeeded by Yang Song
Government offices
Preceded by Li Yizhong	Minister of Industry and Information Technology; December 2010 – 2020	Succeeded by Xiao Yaqing
