= Xiong Weiping =

Xiong Weiping (Chinese: 熊维平, born 1956) is President of Chinalco, China's largest diversified mining company.

== Biography ==
Xiong Weiping is President of Chinalco and also chairman and Chief Executive Officer of Aluminum Corporation of China Limited (“Chalco”), and Chairman of Chalco's Remuneration and Nomination Committee. He has a PhD and is a professor in Mineral Engineering of Central South University. He is also a PhD Supervisor at Guanghua School of Management, Beijing University. Prior to his current position at Chinalco, Xiong's previous roles included: Executive Vice President of Central South University, Dean of the School of Management; Deputy General Manager of China Copper, Lead and Zinc Group Company; Deputy General Manager and Vice President of Chinalco; Senior Vice President and President of Chalco. From June 2006 to 2009, he served as the Vice Chairman and President of China National Travel Service (HK) Group Corporation and China Travel Service (Holdings) Hong Kong Limited as well as the Vice Chairman and President of China Travel International Investment Hong Kong Limited.

Xiong is a member of the 18th Central Commission for Discipline Inspection.

In October 2014, Chengdu mayor Ge Honglin replaced Xiong Weiping as Chinalco's top executive.
