= Electorate opinion polling for the 2016 Australian federal election =

Various research and polling firms conducted opinion polling prior to the 2016 federal election in individual electorates across Australia, in relation to voting intentions in the Australian House of Representatives.

== New South Wales ==
Date	Seat	2CP vote
		L/NP	ALP	IND	L/NP swing	Seat classification	Sample size
25 Jun 2016	Reid (NSW)	52%	48%		−1.3	Marginal L/NP	?
25 Jun 2016	Macarthur (NSW)	50%	50%		−3.3	Marginal L/NP	?
25 Jun 2016	Lindsay (NSW)	51%	49%		−2.0	Marginal L/NP	?
25 Jun 2016	Gilmore (NSW)	51%	49%		−2.8	Marginal L/NP	?
25 Jun 2016	Dobell (NSW)	51%	49%		+1.2	Notional marginal ALP	?
25 Jun 2016	Banks (NSW)	52%	48%		−0.8	Marginal L/NP	?
24 Jun 2016	Cowper (NSW)	50%		50%	−13.2	Safe L/NP	628
23 Jun 2016	Eden-Monaro (NSW)	45%	55%		−7.9	Marginal L/NP	636
23 Jun 2016	Dobell (NSW)	47%	53%		−2.8	Notional marginal ALP	616
23 Jun 2016	Gilmore (NSW)	47%	53%		−6.8	Marginal L/NP	632
23 Jun 2016	Lindsay (NSW)	46%	54%		−7.0	Marginal L/NP	610
23 Jun 2016	Macquarie (NSW)	46%	54%		−8.5	Marginal L/NP	636
23 Jun 2016	Page (NSW)	46%	54%		−7.1	Marginal L/NP	647
21 Jun 2016	Eden-Monaro (NSW)	45%	55%		−7.9	Marginal L/NP	719
21 Jun 2016	Lindsay (NSW)	51%	49%		−4.0	Marginal L/NP	656
21 Jun 2016	Page (NSW)	48%	52%		−5.1	Marginal L/NP	788
20 Jun 2016	New England (NSW)	51%		49%	−18.5	Safe L/NP	523
18 Jun 2016	Robertson (NSW)	47%	53%		−6.1	Marginal L/NP	?
18 Jun 2016	Paterson (NSW)	43%	57%		−6.7	Notional marginal ALP	?
17 Jun 2016	Lindsay (NSW)	53%	47%		0.0	Marginal L/NP	502
17 Jun 2016	Robertson (NSW)	51%	49%		−2.1	Marginal L/NP	537
17 Jun 2016	Macarthur (NSW)	50%	50%		−3.3	Marginal L/NP	509
15 Jun 2016	Cowper (NSW)	53.8%		46.2%	−9.4	Safe L/NP	842
11 Jun 2016	Dobell (NSW)	49%	51%		−0.8	Notional marginal ALP	628
11 Jun 2016	Lindsay (NSW)	54%	46%		+1.0	Marginal L/NP	?
31 May 2016	Wentworth (NSW)	58%	42%		−10.9	Safe L/NP	626
19 May 2016	Macarthur (NSW)	49%	51%		−4.4	Marginal L/NP	628
14 May 2016	Macarthur (NSW)	49%	51%		−4.3	Marginal L/NP	514
14 May 2016	Banks (NSW)	50%	50%		−2.8	Marginal L/NP	501
14 May 2016	Dobell (NSW)	50%	50%		+0.2	Notional marginal ALP	504
14 May 2016	Lindsay (NSW)	54%	46%		+1.0	Marginal L/NP	554

== Victoria ==
Date	Seat	2CP vote
		L/NP	ALP	GRN	IND	L/NP swing	Seat classification	Sample size
25 Jun 2016	Dunkley (Vic)	53%	47%			−2.6	Marginal L/NP	?
25 Jun 2016	Corangamite (Vic)	53%	47%			−0.9	Marginal L/NP	?
25 Jun 2016	Bruce (Vic)	48%	52%			−0.2	Marginal ALP	?
25 Jun 2016	McEwen (Vic)	48%	52%			−1.8	Marginal ALP	?
20 Jun 2016	Batman (Vic)		45%	55%		N/A	Safe ALP	1100
17 Jun 2016	Batman (Vic)		53%	47%		N/A	Safe ALP	?
17 Jun 2016	Corangamite (Vic)	51%	49%			−2.9	Marginal L/NP	509
17 Jun 2016	Dunkley (Vic)	52%	48%			−3.6	Marginal L/NP	500
13 Jun 2016	Menzies (Vic)	61%			39%	−3.4	Safe L/NP	719
11 Jun 2016	Corangamite (Vic)	51%	49%			−2.9	Marginal L/NP	?
11 Jun 2016	Deakin (Vic)	52%	48%			−1.2	Marginal L/NP	?
3–4 Jun 2016	Higgins (Vic)	53%		47%		−6.9	Fairly safe L/NP	1118
26 May 2016	Corangamite (Vic)	54%	46%			+0.1	Marginal L/NP	770
13 May 2016	Dunkley (Vic)	48%	52%			−7.6	Marginal L/NP	?

== Queensland ==
Date	Seat	2CP vote
		L/NP	ALP	KAP	L/NP swing	Seat classification	Sample size
25 Jun 2016	Kennedy (Qld)	42%		58%	−5.8	Marginal KAP	?
25 Jun 2016	Longman (Qld)	53%	47%		−3.9	Fairly safe L/NP	?
25 Jun 2016	Brisbane (Qld)	52%	48%		−2.3	Marginal L/NP	?
25 Jun 2016	Petrie (Qld)	46%	54%		−4.5	Marginal L/NP	?
25 Jun 2016	Capricornia (Qld)	49%	51%		−1.8	Marginal L/NP	?
25 Jun 2016	Griffith (Qld)	47%	53%		0.0	Marginal ALP	?
17 Jun 2016	Herbert (Qld)	54%	46%		−2.2	Fairly safe L/NP	505
17 Jun 2016	Capricornia (Qld)	50%	50%		−0.8	Marginal L/NP	529
17 Jun 2016	Brisbane (Qld)	51%	49%		−3.3	Marginal L/NP	594
11 Jun 2016	Bonner (Qld)	56%	44%		+2.3	Marginal L/NP	?
2 Jun 2016	Longman (Qld)	50%	50%		−6.9	Fairly safe L/NP	836

== Western Australia ==
Date	Seat	2CP vote
		L/NP	ALP	L/NP swing	Seat classification	Sample size
18 Jun 2016	Pearce (WA)	51%	49%	−8.3	Fairly safe L/NP	?
18 Jun 2016	Hasluck (WA)	50%	50%	−6.0	Fairly safe L/NP	?
17 Jun 2016	Burt (WA)	48%	52%	−8.1	Fairly safe L/NP	?
16 Jun 2016	Hasluck (WA)	53%	47%	−3.0	Fairly safe L/NP	753
11 Jun 2016	Cowan (WA)	50%	50%	−4.5	Marginal L/NP	?
10 May 2016	Cowan (WA)	49%	51%	−5.5	Marginal L/NP	731

== South Australia ==
Date	Seat	2CP vote
		L/NP	ALP	NXT	L/NP swing	Seat classification	Sample size
29 Jun 2016	Adelaide (SA)	47%	53%		+0.9	Marginal ALP	518
29 Jun 2016	Port Adelaide (SA)	33%	67%		−3.0	Safe ALP	500+
25 Jun 2016	Hindmarsh (SA)	50%	50%		−1.9	Marginal L/NP	500+
25 Jun 2016	Boothby (SA)	53%	47%		−4.1	Fairly safe L/NP	500+
20 Jun 2016	Barker (SA)	48%		52%	−18.6	Safe L/NP	869
20 Jun 2016	Adelaide (SA)	51%	49%		+4.9	Marginal ALP	364
17 Jun 2016	Sturt (SA)	58%		42%	−2.1	Safe L/NP	596
16 Jun 2016	Mayo (SA)	48%		52%	−14.5	Safe L/NP	681
11 Jun 2016	Mayo (SA)	45.7%		54.3%	−16.8	Safe L/NP	?
9 Jun 2016	Grey (SA)	46%		54%	−17.5	Safe L/NP	665
22 May 2016	Sturt (SA)	51%		49%	−9.1	Safe L/NP	762
16 May 2016	Mayo (SA)	48.5%		51.5%	−14.0	Safe L/NP	681

== Tasmania ==
Date	Seat	2CP vote
		L/NP	ALP	IND	L/NP swing	Seat classification	Sample size
25 Jun 2016	Bass (Tas)	50%	50%		−4.0	Marginal L/NP	538
25 Jun 2016	Braddon (Tas)	50%	50%		−2.6	Marginal L/NP	566
25 Jun 2016	Denison (Tas)	35%		63%	N/A	Safe IND	552
25 Jun 2016	Franklin (Tas)	41%	59%		−3.9	Marginal ALP	550
25 Jun 2016	Lyons (Tas)	45%	55%		−6.2	Marginal L/NP	540
17 Jun 2016	Bass (Tas)	52%	48%		−2.0	Marginal L/NP	517
31 May 2016	Bass (Tas)	49%	51%		−5.0	Marginal L/NP	824
15 May 2016	Denison (Tas)	34%		66%	N/A	Safe IND	596
15 May 2016	Bass (Tas)	51%	49%		−3.0	Marginal L/NP	632
15 May 2016	Lyons (Tas)	51%	49%		−0.2	Marginal L/NP	602
15 May 2016	Franklin (Tas)	46%	54%		+1.1	Marginal ALP	597
15 May 2016	Braddon (Tas)	53%	47%		+0.4	Marginal L/NP	592

== Northern Territory ==
Date	Seat	2CP vote
		L/NP	ALP	L/NP swing	Seat classification	Sample size
22−23 Jun 2016	Solomon (NT)	39%	61%	−12.4	Marginal L/NP	513
