= State Radio Regulation of China =

Radio regulation authority of China

Agency overview
- Jurisdiction: National
- Headquarters: Beijing
- Parent agency: State Council
- Website: srrc.org.cn

The State Radio Regulation of China (abbreviated as SRRC) is the radio regulation authority of the People's Republic of China with responsibilities including spectrum management and frequency allocation. It is referred to variously as a bureau or office under the Ministry of Industry and Information Technology. The State Radio Monitoring Center (SRMC) / the State Radio Spectrum Management Center (SRSMC) are two technical centers supporting the SRRC. In contrast the National Radio and Television Administration regulates radio and other media content.

== See also ==
- Amateur radio licensing in China
