= Li Yizhong =

Chinese government official

Li Yizhong (Chinese: 李毅中; born 1945) is a former director of Minister of Industry and Information Technology of the People's Republic of China.

== Personal life and education ==
Yizhong was born during 1945 in Datong City, Shanxi Province. He graduated Beijing Petroleum College in 1966.

== Career ==
Yizhong is known for his former roles such as head of State Administration of Work Safety, Mayor of Tianjin, and vice-minister in charge of the National Development and Reform Commission.

Political offices
New title	Minister of Industry and Information Technology; March 2008 – December 2010	Succeeded by Miao Wei
