= Aluminum Corporation of China Limited =

State-owned aluminium company headquartered in Beijing, China

Aluminum Corporation of China Limited 中国铝业股份有限公司
- Native name: 中国铝业股份
- Type: Public; state-owned
- Traded as: SSE: 601600 (A share); SEHK: 2600 (H share); CSI A50
- Industry: Metals
- Founded: 2001; 25 years ago (Beijing, China)
- Headquarters: Beijing, China,
- Key people: Xiong Weiping (CEO), Ge Honglin (Chairman of the Board)
- Products: Aluminum and copper products
- Revenue: US$ 63.6 billion (2023)
- Net income: US$ 877 million (2023)
- Total assets: US$ 86.9 billion (2023)
- Owner: Aluminum Corporation of China (35.78%); General Public
- Number of employees: 124,995 (2023)

Aluminum Corporation of China Limited (Chinese: 中国铝业股份有限公司, also known as Chalco) is a state-owned multinational corporation headquartered in Beijing, China. It is publicly listed on both the Shanghai Stock Exchange and the Hong Kong Stock Exchange, and is part of the SSE 180 index.

In 2021, Chalco was the world's largest aluminum producer, surpassing China Hongqiao Group, Rusal, and Shandong Xinfa.

== Corporate Affairs ==
Aluminum Corporation of China Limited (Chalco) (Chinese: 中国铝业股份有限公司) is a publicly listed company and serves as the principal commercial arm of its state-owned parent, the Aluminum Corporation of China (Chinalco) (Chinese: 中国铝业公司). While both entities are closely related and share similar names, they perform different functions within China's metals industry.

The Aluminum Corporation of China is a wholly state-owned enterprise under the direct administration of the State-owned Assets Supervision and Administration Commission of the State Council (SASAC). It is responsible for national-level oversight of non-ferrous metal resources, manages strategic reserves, and serves as the parent entity for a range of subsidiaries, including Chalco.

Chalco, officially Aluminum Corporation of China Limited (中国铝业股份有限公司), was established in 2001 and subsequently listed on the Shanghai Stock Exchange and Hong Kong Stock Exchange. As of 2024, Chinalco retains a 35.78% controlling stake in Chalco. Chalco houses most of Chinalco's operational assets and is responsible for its revenue-generating activities, such as alumina refining, aluminum smelting, bauxite mining, copper operations, and overseas project investments. Chalco is also the vehicle through which Chinalco interfaces with global markets, engages in foreign joint ventures, and secures project financing. In contrast to its policy-oriented parent, Chalco operates under a market-based framework and is accountable to both state and private shareholders.

== History ==
Aluminum Corporation of China (Chinalco), Chalco's parent company, was established in 2001 as part of China's industrial restructuring strategy.

In 2008, Chalco was added to the Hang Seng Index as a blue-chip constituent.

Chalco's attempted $19.5 billion investment in Rio Tinto in 2009 was rejected, a move that was interpreted in China as part of a broader geopolitical pushback against its global resource acquisitions.

== Operations ==
Aluminum Corporation of China Limited (Chalco) operates across several major business segments, including alumina refining, primary aluminum smelting, mining, engineering and technical services, and international joint ventures.

=== Smelting ===
Domestically, Chalco commissioned a 400,000-tonne-per-year green aluminum smelter in Yunnan Province in early 2024, powered entirely by hydropower. The facility is part of China's decarbonization push and replaces older, coal-fired capacity.

=== Peru ===
Chalco began developing an open-pit copper mine in the Morococha District of Peru in the early 2010s. The mine, which includes the Mount Toromocho deposit, launched production in 2013 and targets 250,000 tons of copper annually, along with silver and molybdenum byproducts.

In 2017, Chalco announced a $1.3 billion expansion to boost output by 70,000 tonnes annually.

=== Guinea ===
Chalco is also a member of the Chinese consortium participating in the development of the Simandou iron ore project, one of the world's largest untapped high-grade iron ore deposits. Located in southeastern Guinea, the Simandou project is expected to supply over 100 million tonnes of iron ore annually once fully operational. The Chinese consortium includes Chalco and Rio Tinto who are jointly developing the infrastructure, including a 600 km railway and a deep-water port.
