= Zhejiang Zhoushan High School =

Secondary school in Zhoushan, Zhejiang

- Simplified Chinese: 浙江省舟山中学
- Traditional Chinese: 浙江省舟山中學
- Literal meaning: Zhejiang Province Zhoushan Secondary School
Transcriptions
Standard Mandarin
- Hanyu Pinyin: Zhèjiāng Shěng Zhōushān Zhōngxué

Zhejiang Zhoushan High School is a public secondary school in Zhoushan, Zhejiang. The school has developed a curriculum in collaboration with Southlands Christian Schools (a school in California) and has at its core independent learning in preparation for admission into an American university.

David Metz of The New York Times described it as "Zhoushan’s most elite high school".

The campus has boarding facilities and a planetarium. As of 2015, the school had approximately 1500 students.
