= Aluminum Corporation of China =

Aluminium company in Beijing, China

Aluminum Corporation of China (Chinese: 中国铝业公司, abbreviated as Chinalco) is a Chinese state-owned enterprise and the top-level holding company for China's non-ferrous metals industry. It is wholly owned by the State-owned Assets Supervision and Administration Commission (SASAC) of the State Council and is responsible for policy execution, strategic asset oversight, and international resource coordination.

Chinalco is not a listed entity, but it exercises control over a portfolio of subsidiaries engaged in industrial operations, the most prominent of which is Aluminum Corporation of China Limited (Chalco). Financial media underline this distinction, describing Chalco as "a Hong Kong-listed subsidiary of the Chinese state-owned metals and mining group Chinalco" and as "the listed unit of China's biggest aluminium producer, Aluminum Corp. of China, or Chinalco".

== Role and structure ==
Chinalco serves as China's national organization responsible for the non-ferrous metals sector. Its primary duties include:

- Guiding industry consolidation and modernization
- Managing national strategic mineral reserves (e.g., bauxite, copper, rare earths)
- Coordinating overseas resource investments and acquisitions in alignment with national policy
- Providing financial and administrative oversight of key operating subsidiaries

Unlike Chalco, which is commercially driven and answerable to shareholders, Chinalco operates as a policy-oriented entity, with broad authority to invest, restructure, and align subsidiaries with government objectives.

Chinalco is the controlling shareholder of Chalco, holding approximately 35.78 percent as of 2024. Chalco operates commercially and is listed on the Shanghai Stock Exchange and Hong Kong Stock Exchange. While Chalco handles production, sales, and investment execution, Chinalco retains strategic oversight and ultimate control.

== Subsidiaries and Affiliates ==
While Chinalco does not itself carry out mining or smelting operations, it holds controlling interests in companies that do. Its major subsidiaries include:

- Aluminum Corporation of China Limited (Chalco): A publicly listed company engaged in alumina refining, aluminum smelting, and copper mining.
- China Copper Co., Ltd. – Oversees the group's copper-related investments.
- China Rare Earth Co., Ltd. – Manages Chinalco's portfolio of rare earth mining and processing assets.
- China Aluminum International Engineering (Chalieco) – An engineering and EPC contractor for non-ferrous industries.
