= Politics of Hebei =

The politics of Hebei Province in the People's Republic of China is structured in a dual party-government system like all other governing institutions in mainland China.

The Governor of Hebei is the highest-ranking official in the People's Government of Hebei. However, in the province's dual party-government governing system, the Governor has less power than the Hebei Chinese Communist Party (CCP) Provincial Committee Secretary.

== Secretaries of the CCP Hebei Committee ==
No.	Image	Name	Term start	Term end	Ref.
1		Lin Tie (1904–1989)	September 1949	August 1966	
2		Liu Zihou (1909–2001)	August 1966	December 1979	
3		Jin Ming (1913–1998)	December 1979	June 1982	
4		Gao Yang (1909–2009)	June 1982	May 1985	
5		Xing Chongzhi (1927–2000)	May 1985	January 1993	
6		Cheng Weigao (1933–2010)	27 January 1993	8 October 1998	
7		Ye Liansong (born 1935)	October 1998	June 2000	
8		Wang Xudong (born 1946)	June 2000	December 2002	
9		Bai Keming (born 1943)	November 2002	August 2007	
10		Zhang Yunchuan (born 1946)	August 2007	August 2011	
11		Zhang Qingli (born 1951)	28 August 2011	20 March 2013	
12		Zhou Benshun (born 1953)	20 March 2013	31 July 2015	
13		Zhao Kezhi (born 1953)	31 July 2015	28 October 2017	
14		Wang Dongfeng (born 1958)	28 October 2017	22 April 2022	
15		Ni Yuefeng (born 1964)	22 April 2022	31 July 2026	
16		Luo Wen (born 1964)	31 July 2026	Incumbent	

== Governors of Hebei ==
1. Yang Xiufeng (杨秀峰): August 8, 1949 – November 15, 1952
2. Lin Tie (林铁): November 15, 1952 – April 16, 1958
3. Liu Zihou (刘子厚): April 16, 1958 – January 19, 1967
4. Li Xuefeng (李雪峰): February 3, 1968 – January 24, 1971
5. Liu Zihou (刘子厚): January 24, 1971 – December 26, 1979
6. Li Erzhong (李尔重): February 6, 1980 – June 16, 1982
7. Liu Bingyan (刘秉彦): August 10, 1982 – April 28, 1983
8. Zhang Shuguang (张曙光): April 28, 1983 – May 4, 1986
9. Xie Feng (解峰): May 4, 1986 – May 3, 1988
10. Yue Qifeng (岳歧峰): May 3, 1988 – June 15, 1990
11. Cheng Weigao (程维高): June 15, 1990 – May 21, 1993
12. Ye Liansong (叶连松): May 21, 1993 – November 6, 1999
13. Niu Maosheng (钮茂生): November 6, 1999 – December 21, 2002
14. Ji Yunshi (季允石): December 21, 2002 – October 31, 2006
15. Guo Gengmao (郭庚茂): October 31, 2006 – April 15, 2008
16. Hu Chunhua (胡春华): April 15, 2008 – December 15, 2009
17. Chen Quanguo (陈全国): December 15, 2009 – August 24, 2011
18. Zhang Qingwei (张庆伟): August 24, 2011 – April 7, 2017
19. Xu Qin (许勤): April 7, 2017 – October 21, 2021
20. Wang Zhengpu(王正谱): October 21, 2021 – October 25, 2026
21. Zhao Chenxin (赵辰昕) (Acting): October 25, 2026 – present

== Chairmen of Hebei People's Congress ==
1. Jiang Yizhen (江一真): February 6, 1980 – April 28, 1983
2. Liu Bingyan (刘秉彦): April 28, 1983 – June 26, 1985
3. Sun Guozhi (孙国治): June 26, 1985 – May 7, 1988
4. Guo Zhi (郭志): May 7, 1988 – May 18, 1993
5. Lu Chuanzan (吕传赞): May 18, 1993 – January 18, 1998
6. Cheng Weigao (程维高): January 18, 1998 – January 10, 2003
7. Bai Keming (白克明): January 18, 2003 – January 28, 2008
8. Zhang Yunchuan (张云川): January 28, 2008 – November 26, 2011
9. Zhang Qingli (张庆黎): January 10, 2012 – January 12, 2014
10. Zhou Benshun (周本顺): January 12, 2014 – October 16, 2015
11. Zhao Kezhi (赵克志): January 12, 2016 – December 1, 2017
12. Wang Dongfeng (王东峰): January 29, 2018 – April 22, 2022
13. Ni Yuefeng (倪岳峰): April 22, 2022 – present

== Chairmen of the CPPCC Hebei Committee ==
1. Ma Guorui (马国瑞): January 19, 1955 – October 11, 1964
2. Yan Dakai (阎达开): October 11, 1964 – December 3, 1977
3. Liu Zihou (刘子厚): December 3, 1977 – February 7, 1980
4. Yin Zhe (尹哲): February 2, 1980 – April 4，1988
5. Li Wenshan (李文珊): April 4, 1988 – January 13, 1998
6. Lu Chuanzan (吕传赞): January 13, 1998 – January 15, 2003
7. Zhao Jinduo (赵金铎): January 15, 2003 – January 26, 2008
8. Liu Dewang (刘德旺): January 26, 2008 – January 9, 2012
9. Fu Zhifang (付志方): January 9, 2012 – January 28, 2018
10. Ye Dongsong (叶冬松): January 28, 2018 – present
