= Hebei Military District =

- 中国人民解放军河北省军区
- Founded: 1949; 77 years ago
- Country: People's Republic of China
- Allegiance: Chinese Communist Party
- Type: Military district
- Role: Command and control
- Part of: People's Liberation Army
- Headquarters: Shijiazhuang, Hebei

Commanders
- Commander: Major general (shaojiang) Feng Fuhai
- Political Commisar: Major general (shaojiang) Fu Xiaodong

Chinese name
- Simplified Chinese: 中国人民解放军河北省军区
- Traditional Chinese: 中國人民解放軍河北省軍區
Transcriptions
Standard Mandarin
- Hanyu Pinyin: Zhōngguó Rénmín Jiěfàngjūn Héběishěng Jūnqū

The Hebei Military District (Chinese: 中国人民解放军河北省军区; full name People's Liberation Army Hebei Military District or PLA Hebei Military District) is a military district of the National Defense Mobilization Department of the Central Military Commission in China.

== History ==
Hebei Military District was established in 1949.

== Leaders ==
=== Commanders ===
Name (English)	Name (Chinese)	Tenure begins	Tenure ends	Note
Sun Yi	孙毅	July 1949	October 1950	
Wang Guanghua (born 1909)	王光华	October 1950	May 1952	
Peng Mingzhi	彭明治	May 1952	September 1957	
Wang Daobang	王道邦	September 1957	November 1959	
Xiao Siming	萧思明	May 1960	May 1964	
Ma Hui	马辉	May 1964	March 1983	
Zhang Zhenchuan	张振川	March 1983	July 1985	
Dong Xuelin	董学林	July 1985	June 1990	
Han Shiqian	韩世谦	June 1990	January 1995	
Hua Binglai	滑兵来	January 1995	August 1998	
Chen Yutian	陈玉田	August 1998	November 2004	
Zhong Zhiming	钟志明	November 2004	January 2006	
Duan Duanwu	段端武	January 2006	October 2007	
Mian Fucheng	芇福成	October 2007	May 2011	
Shi Luze	史鲁泽	May 2011	December 2014	
Shao Heng	邵亨	February 2015	April 2017	
Wang Shun	王舜	April 2017	April 2019	
Wang Jiping	王继平	April 2019	April 2023	
Feng Fuhai	冯福海	May 2023		

=== Political commissars ===
Name (English)	Name (Chinese)	Tenure begins	Tenure ends	Note
Lin Tie	林铁	July 1949	August 1966	
Liu Zihou	刘子厚	November 1966	May 1967	
Li Xuefeng	李雪峰	February 1968	December 1970	
Liu Zihou	刘子厚	February 1971	May 1980	
Jin Ming	金明	January 1980	June 1982	
Gao Yang	高扬	June 1982	May 1985	
Zhang Chao	张超	July 1985	December 1989	
Ren Peiyu	任佩瑜	June 1990	April 1994	
Wang Chaohai	汪潮海	April 1994	December 2000	
Ji Yaocheng	纪耀成	December 2000	January 2003	
Zhang Lianren	张连仁	January 2003	December 2006	
Zhang Yanxin	张彦欣	December 2006	March 2012	
Li Guangju	李光聚	March 2012	July 2015	
Guo Xiaodong	郭晓东	July 2015	September 2015	
Shang Zhengui	尚振贵	September 2015	August 2016	
Han Xiaodong	韩晓东	August 2017	May 2018	
Li Ning	李宁	May 2018	2022	
Fu Xiaodong	傅晓东	2022		
