= Sun Yuning =

Chinese politician

- 孙玉宁

Deputy Head of the General Administration of Customs
- In office October 2020 – 30 September 2024
- Head: Yu Guangzhou; Ni Yuefeng; Yu Jianhua
- Preceded by: Li Guo

Personal details
- Born: July 1965 (age 61) Shulan County, Jilin, China
- Party: Chinese Communist Party (1988–2025; expelled)
- Education: Party School of the CCP Jilin Provincial Committee

Chinese name
- Simplified Chinese: 孙玉宁
- Traditional Chinese: 孫玉寧
Transcriptions
Standard Mandarin
- Hanyu Pinyin: Sun Yuning

Sun Yuning (Chinese: 孙玉宁; born July 1965) is a former Chinese politician. He was investigated by China's top anti-graft agency in September 2024. Previously he served as deputy head of the General Administration of Customs.

== Early life and education ==
Sun was born in Shulan County (now Shulan), Jilin, in July 1965.

== Career ==
Sun entered the workforce in August 1985, and joined the Chinese Communist Party (CCP) in September 1988.

Sun worked in Changchun Administration of Customs for a long time and eventually became deputy head in 2004. He was head of Manzhouli Administration of Customs in 2012, head of Zhengzhou Administration of Customs in 2015, and head of Dalian Administration of Customs in 2018. He was promoted to deputy head of the General Administration of Customs in October 2020, and served until September 2024.

== Downfall ==
On 24 September 2025, Sun was put under investigation for alleged "serious violations of discipline and laws" by the Central Commission for Discipline Inspection (CCDI), the party's internal disciplinary body, and the National Supervisory Commission, the highest anti-corruption agency of China.

On 14 March 2025, Sun was expelled from the CCP and removed from public office, at that same month, he was detained by the Supreme People's Procuratorate. On July 15, he was indicted on suspicion of accepting bribes. On December 10, he was sentenced to 13 years in prison for bribery and fined him 4 million yuan ($566,300) by the Hefei Intermediate People's Court in Anhui province.
