= Governor of Hebei =

Head of the Hebei Provincial People's Government, China

Governor of the Hebei Provincial People's Government
- 河北省人民政府省长
- National Emblem of China

- Flag of China
- Incumbent; Zhao Chenxin; Acting since 25 October 2026
- Hebei Provincial People's Government
- Type: Governor
- Status: Provincial and ministerial-level official
- Reports to: Hebei Provincial People's Congress and its Standing Committee
- Nominator: Presidium of the Hebei Provincial People's Congress
- Appointer: Hebei Provincial People's Congress
- Term length: Five years, renewable
- Inaugural holder: Yang Xiufeng
- Formation: 8 August 1949
- Deputy: Deputy Governors; Secretary-General

The governor of Hebei, officially the Governor of the Hebei Provincial People's Government, is the head of Hebei Province and leader of the Hebei Provincial People's Government.

The governor is elected by the Hebei Provincial People's Congress, and responsible to it and its Standing Committee. The governor is a provincial level official and is responsible for the overall decision-making of the provincial government. The governor is assisted by an executive vice governor as well as several vice governors. The governor generally serves as the deputy secretary of the Hebei Provincial Committee of the Chinese Communist Party and as a member of the CCP Central Committee. The governor is the second highest-ranking official in the province after the secretary of the CCP Hebei Committee. The current acting governor is Zhao Chenxin, who took office on 25 October 2026.

== List of governors ==
=== Republic of China ===
==== Beiyang government ====
===== Military chief =====
No.	Officeholder	Term of office	
No.	Officeholder	Took office	Left office
Governor of Zhili Province
–	Zhang Xiluan (1843–1922)	15 March 1912	8 September 1912
1	Feng Guozhang (1859–1919)	8 September 1912	16 December 1913
–	Zhao Bingjun (1859–1914)	16 December 1913	27 February 1914
2	Zhu Jiabao (1860–1923)	27 February 1914	30 June 1914
General of Zhili Province
2	Zhu Jiabao (1859–1919)	30 June 1914	6 July 1916
Military Governor of Zhili Province
2	Zhu Jiabao (1859–1919)	6 July 1916	16 September 1916
3	Cao Kun (1862–1938)	16 September 1916	22 October 1923
–	Yang Yide (1873–1944)	12 April 1922	22 October 1923
4	Wang Chengbin (1874–1936)	22 October 1923	11 November 1924
Zhili Provincial Supervisory Office
5	Lu Yongxiang (1867–1933)	3 December 1924	11 December 1924
6	Li Jinglin (1885–1931)	17 January 1925 (acting from 11 December 1924)	25 December 1925
–	Li Shuangkai	26 April 1925	25 December 1925
7	Sun Yue (1878–1928)	25 December 1925	21 March 1926
8	Chu Yupu (1887–1929)	11 August 1927 (acting from 21 March 1926)	26 June 1928

===== Civilian governor =====
No.	Officeholder	Term of office	
No.	Officeholder	Took office	Left office
Civil Affairs Director of Zhili Province
1	Zhang Xiluan (1843–1922)	15 March 1912	8 September 1912
2	Feng Guozhang (1859–1919)	8 September 1912	17 June 1913
3	Liu Ruozeng (1860–1929)	17 June 1913	19 February 1914
4	Zhao Bingjun (1859–1914)	19 February 1914	27 February 1914
5	Zhu Jiabao (1860–1923)	27 February 1914	23 May 1914
Zhili Provincial Inspector
5	Zhu Jiabao (1860–1923)	23 May 1914	6 July 1916
Governor of Zhili Province
5	Zhu Jiabao (1860–1923)	6 July 1916	8 July 1917
8	Cao Kun (1862–1938)	8 July 1917	30 January 1918
9	Cao Rui (1868–1924)	12 July 1919 (acting from 30 January 1918)	18 June 1922
–	Yang Yide (1873–1944)	17 April 1922	18 June 1922
9	Gao Lingwei (1870–1940)	18 June 1922	24 June 1922
10	Wang Chengbin (1874–1936)	24 June 1922	11 November 1924
11	Li Jinglin (1885–1931)	13 November 1924	27 June 1925
–	Yang Yide (1873–1944)	3 December 1924	27 June 1925
11	Li Jinglin (1885–1931)	27 June 1925	25 December 1925
12	Sun Yue (1878–1928)	25 December 1925	21 March 1926
13	Chu Yupu (1887–1929)	11 August 1927 (acting from 21 March 1926)	20 March 1928
14	Sun Shiwei (1883–1958)	20 March 1928	26 June 1928

==== Nationalist government ====
No.	Officeholder	Term of office		Party
No.	Officeholder	Took office	Left office	Party
1	Shang Zhen (1888–1978)	25 June 1928	19 August 1929	Kuomintang
2	Xu Yongchang (1885–1959)	10 August 1929	27 September 1930	Kuomintang
3	Wang Shuchang (1885–1960)	27 September 1930	18 August 1932	Kuomintang
4	Yu Xuezhong (1890–1964)	18 August 1932	6 June 1935	Kuomintang
–	Zhang Houwan	6 June 1935	25 June 1935	Independent
5	Shang Zhen (1888–1978)	25 June 1935	12 December 1935	Kuomintang
6	Song Zheyuan (1885–1940)	12 December 1935	27 November 1936	Kuomintang
7	Feng Zhi'an (1896–1954)	27 November 1936	2 June 1938	Kuomintang
8	Lu Zhonglin (1884–1966)	2 June 1938	3 February 1940	Kuomintang
9	Pang Bingxun (1879–1963)	3 February 1940	15 June 1943	Kuomintang
–	Ma Fawu (1894–1992)	15 June 1943	4 September 1945	Kuomintang
10	Sun Lianzhong (1893–1990)	26 June 1945	17 December 1947	Kuomintang
11	Ding Zhipan (1896–1966)	5 February 1948	31 January 1949	Kuomintang

==== Japanese occupation ====
- Governor of the Hebei Provincial Office:
  - Gao Lingwei
  - Wu Zanzhou
  - Du Xijun
- Governor of the Hebei Provincial Government:
  - Chen Zengye
  - Rong Zhen

=== People's Republic of China ===
No.	Officeholder	Term of office		Party	Ref.
No.	Officeholder	Took office	Left office	Party	Ref.
Governor of the Hebei Provincial People's Government
1	Yang Xiufeng (1897–1983)	8 August 1949	15 November 1952	Chinese Communist Party	
2	Lin Tie (1904–1989)	15 November 1952	February 1955	Chinese Communist Party	
Governor of the Hebei Provincial People's Committee
2	Lin Tie (1904–1989)	February 1955	16 April 1958	Chinese Communist Party	
3	Liu Zihou (1909–2001)	16 April 1958	19 January 1967	Chinese Communist Party	
Director of the Hebei Revolutionary Committee
4	Li Xuefeng (1907–2003)	3 February 1968	24 January 1971	Chinese Communist Party	
5	Liu Zihou (1909–2001)	24 January 1971	26 December 1979	Chinese Communist Party	
Governor of the Hebei Provincial People's Government					
6	Li Erzhong (1914–2010)	6 February 1980	16 June 1982	Chinese Communist Party	
7	Liu Bingyan (1915–1998)	10 August 1982	28 April 1983	Chinese Communist Party	
8	Zhang Shuguang (1920–2002)	28 April 1983	4 May 1986	Chinese Communist Party	
9	Xie Feng (1922–2004)	4 May 1986	3 May 1988	Chinese Communist Party	
10	Yue Qifeng (1931–2008)	3 May 1988	15 June 1990	Chinese Communist Party	
11	Cheng Weigao (1933–2010)	15 June 1990	21 May 1993	Chinese Communist Party	
12	Ye Liansong (born 1935)	21 May 1993	6 November 1998	Chinese Communist Party	
13	Niu Maosheng (born 1939)	6 November 1998	21 December 2002	Chinese Communist Party	
14	Ji Yunshi (born 1945)	21 December 2002	31 October 2006	Chinese Communist Party	
15	Guo Gengmao (born 1950)	31 October 2006	15 April 2008	Chinese Communist Party	
16	Hu Chunhua (born 1963)	15 April 2008	15 December 2009	Chinese Communist Party	
17	Chen Quanguo (born 1955)	15 December 2009	27 August 2011	Chinese Communist Party	
18	Zhang Qingwei (born 1961)	10 January 2012	1 April 2017	Chinese Communist Party	
19	Xu Qin (born 1961)	7 April 2017	22 October 2021	Chinese Communist Party	
20	Wang Zhengpu (born 1963)	21 October 2021	25 October 2026	Chinese Communist Party	
21	Zhao Chenxin (born 1969); Acting	25 October 2026	Incumbent	Chinese Communist Party	
