= Hebei Provincial People's Government =

Hebei Provincial People's Government 河北省人民政府
- Established: August 1, 1949; 77 years ago

Leadership
- Governor: Zhao Chenxin; 25 October 2026
- Deputy Governors: Chen Shaobo, Jin Hui, Wang Litong, Dong Zhaowei, Zhao Dachun, Zhao Xinhai
- Secretary-general: Zhu Haowen
- Parent body: Central People's Government; Hebei Provincial People's Congress
- Elected by: Hebei Provincial People's Congress

Website
- www.hebei.gov.cn

The Hebei Provincial People's Government is the local administrative agency of Hebei. It is officially elected by the Hebei Provincial People's Congress and is formally responsible to the Hebei Provincial People's Congress and its Standing Committee. Under the country's one-party system, the governor is subordinate to the secretary of the Hebei Provincial Committee of the Chinese Communist Party. The Provincial government is headed by a governor, currently Zhao Chenxin.

== History ==
On August 1, 1949, the Hebei Provincial People's Government was formally established, with its capital in Baoding. In 1955, it was reorganized into the Hebei Provincial People's Committee. In February 1958, Tianjin was merged with Hebei Province, and the capital of Hebei Province was relocated to Tianjin. In January 1967, Tianjin was restored as a municipality directly under the Central Government, and the capital of Hebei Province was moved back to Baoding. However, due to the "seizure of power" of the Hebei Provincial People's Committee and armed struggle in Baoding, Hebei Province fell into anarchy. In January 1968, the Beijing Military Region convened a preparatory meeting for the Hebei Provincial Revolutionary Committee. After Zheng Weishan and Li Xuefeng signed and submitted the " Beijing Military Region 's Request Report on the Establishment of the Hebei Provincial Revolutionary Committee" to the Central Government and it was approved, the capital of Hebei Province was moved to Shijiazhuang again. In February of that year, the Hebei Provincial Revolutionary Committee was established. In January 1980, the Hebei Provincial Revolutionary Committee was abolished and the Hebei Provincial People's Government was re-established. In May 2016, the seat of the Hebei Provincial People's Government was moved from No. 46 Weimin South Street, Qiaoxi District, Shijiazhuang City to No. 113 Yuhua East Road, Chang'an District, Shijiazhuang City.

== Organization ==
The organization of the Hebei Provincial People's Government includes:

- General Office of the Hebei Provincial People's Government

=== Component Departments ===
- Hebei Provincial Development and Reform Commission
- Hebei Provincial Department of Education
- Hebei Provincial Department of Science and Technology
- Hebei Provincial Department of Industry and Information Technology
- Hebei Provincial Ethnic Affairs Commission
- Hebei Provincial Public Security Department
- Hebei Provincial Department of Civil Affairs
- Hebei Provincial Department of Justice
- Hebei Provincial Department of Finance
- Hebei Provincial Department of Human Resources and Social Security
- Hebei Provincial Department of Natural Resources
- Hebei Provincial Department of Ecology and Environment
- Hebei Provincial Department of Housing and Urban-Rural Development
- Hebei Provincial Department of Transportation
- Hebei Provincial Water Resources Department
- Hebei Provincial Department of Agriculture and Rural Affairs
- Hebei Provincial Department of Commerce
- Hebei Provincial Department of Culture and Tourism
- Hebei Provincial Health Commission
- Hebei Provincial Department of Veterans Affairs
- Hebei Provincial Emergency Management Department
- Hebei Provincial Audit Office
- Foreign Affairs Office of Hebei Provincial People's Government

=== Directly affiliated special institution ===
- State-owned Assets Supervision and Administration Commission of Hebei Provincial People's Government

=== Organizations under the government ===
- Hebei Provincial Administration for Market Regulation
- Hebei Provincial Radio and Television Bureau
- Hebei Provincial Sports Bureau
- Hebei Provincial Bureau of Statistics
- Hebei Provincial Government Affairs Bureau
- Hebei Provincial People's Government Research Office
- Hebei Provincial National Defense Mobilization Office
- Hebei Provincial Rural Revitalization Bureau
- Hebei Provincial Government Service Management Office
- Hebei Provincial Medical Insurance Bureau (Deputy Department Level)

=== Departmental management organization ===
- The Hebei Provincial Bureau of Grain and Material Reserves is managed by the Provincial Development and Reform Commission.
- Hebei Provincial Energy Bureau is managed by the Provincial Development and Reform Commission.
- The Hebei Provincial Prison Administration Bureau is managed by the Provincial Department of Justice.
- The Hebei Provincial Forestry and Grassland Bureau is managed by the Provincial Department of Natural Resources.
- The Hebei Provincial Cultural Relics Bureau is managed by the Provincial Department of Culture and Tourism.
- The Hebei Provincial Administration of Traditional Chinese Medicine is managed by the Provincial Health Commission.
- The Hebei Provincial Drug Administration is managed by the Provincial Market Supervision Administration.

=== Directly affiliated institutions ===
- Hebei Academy of Sciences
- Hebei Academy of Social Sciences
- Hebei Academy of Agriculture and Forestry Sciences
- Hebei Coalfield Geology Bureau
- Hebei Provincial Bureau of Geology and Mineral Exploration and Development
- Hebei Provincial Supply and Marketing Cooperative
- Hebei Provincial Leading Group Office for the 24th Winter Olympics

=== Dispatched agency ===
- Hebei Xiong'an New Area Management Committee
- Hebei Provincial People's Government Office in Beijing
- Hebei Provincial Government Service Management Office

== See also ==
- Politics of Hebei
  - Hebei Provincial People's Congress
  - Hebei Provincial People's Government
    - Governor of Hebei
  - Hebei Provincial Committee of the Chinese Communist Party
    - Party Secretary of Hebei
  - Hebei Provincial Committee of the Chinese People's Political Consultative Conference
