= Xie Jilai =

Chinese politician

- 谢计来

Vice Chairman of Hebei People's Congress
- In office January 2011 – January 2017
- Chairman: Zhang Yunchuan; Zhang Qingli; Zhou Benshun; Zhao Kezhi

Personal details
- Born: February 1953 (age 73) Jinzhou, Hebei, China
- Party: Chinese Communist Party (1980–2022; expelled)
- Education: Hebei Normal University

Chinese name
- Simplified Chinese: 谢计来
- Traditional Chinese: 謝計來
Transcriptions
Standard Mandarin
- Hanyu Pinyin: Xiè Jìlái

Xie Jilai (Chinese: 谢计来; born February 1953) is a former Chinese politician who spent his entire career in north China's Hebei province. As of January 2022 he was under investigation by China's top anti-corruption agency. He has retired for four years. Previously he served as vice chairman of Hebei People's Congress.

== Biography ==
Xie was born in Jinzhou, Hebei, in February 1953. During the Cultural Revolution, he was a teacher in a school between 1972 and 1978. After resuming the college entrance examination, in 1978, he was accepted to Hebei Normal University, majoring in Chinese language and literature. After university, he worked at there.

Xie joined the Chinese Communist Party in April 1980, and got involved in politics in June 1984. Beginning in November 1987, he served in several posts in Organization Department of the CCP Hebei Provincial Committee, including secretary, deputy director, director, deputy head, and executive deputy head. In January 2011, he rose to become vice chairman of Hebei People's Congress, a position at vice-ministerial level.

== Downfall ==
On 26 January 2022, Xie has been placed under investigation for "serious violations of laws and regulations" by the Central Commission for Discipline Inspection (CCDI), the party's internal disciplinary body, and the National Supervisory Commission, the highest anti-corruption agency of China. On 29 July 2022, he was expelled from the CCP. On August 17, he was detained by the Supreme People's Procuratorate. On November 18, he was indicted on suspicion of accepting bribes. The public prosecutors accused him of abusing his multiple positions between 2002 and 2017 in Hebei to seek favor on behalf of certain organizations and individuals in job promotion and adjustment and project development, in return, he accepted money and property worth over 88.7 million yuan ($12.27 million).

On 5 January 2024, Xie was sentenced to 15 years in prison, along with a fine of 7 million yuan ($979,000), for crimes of taking bribes by the First Intermediate People's Court of Tianjin. His illegal gains will be confiscated and his case transferred to the judiciary.
