= Chinese used vehicle exporting =

Chinese vehicle exports

Chinese used vehicle exporting is a grey market international trade involving the export of used cars and other vehicles from China to other markets around the world. With 300 million cars in China, Chinese vehicles are now entering the used vehicle market overseas to boost demand for the domestic market.

According to the African Courier, it's suggested that the export of used cars is a way to deepen implementations to the Belt and Road Initiative.

== History ==
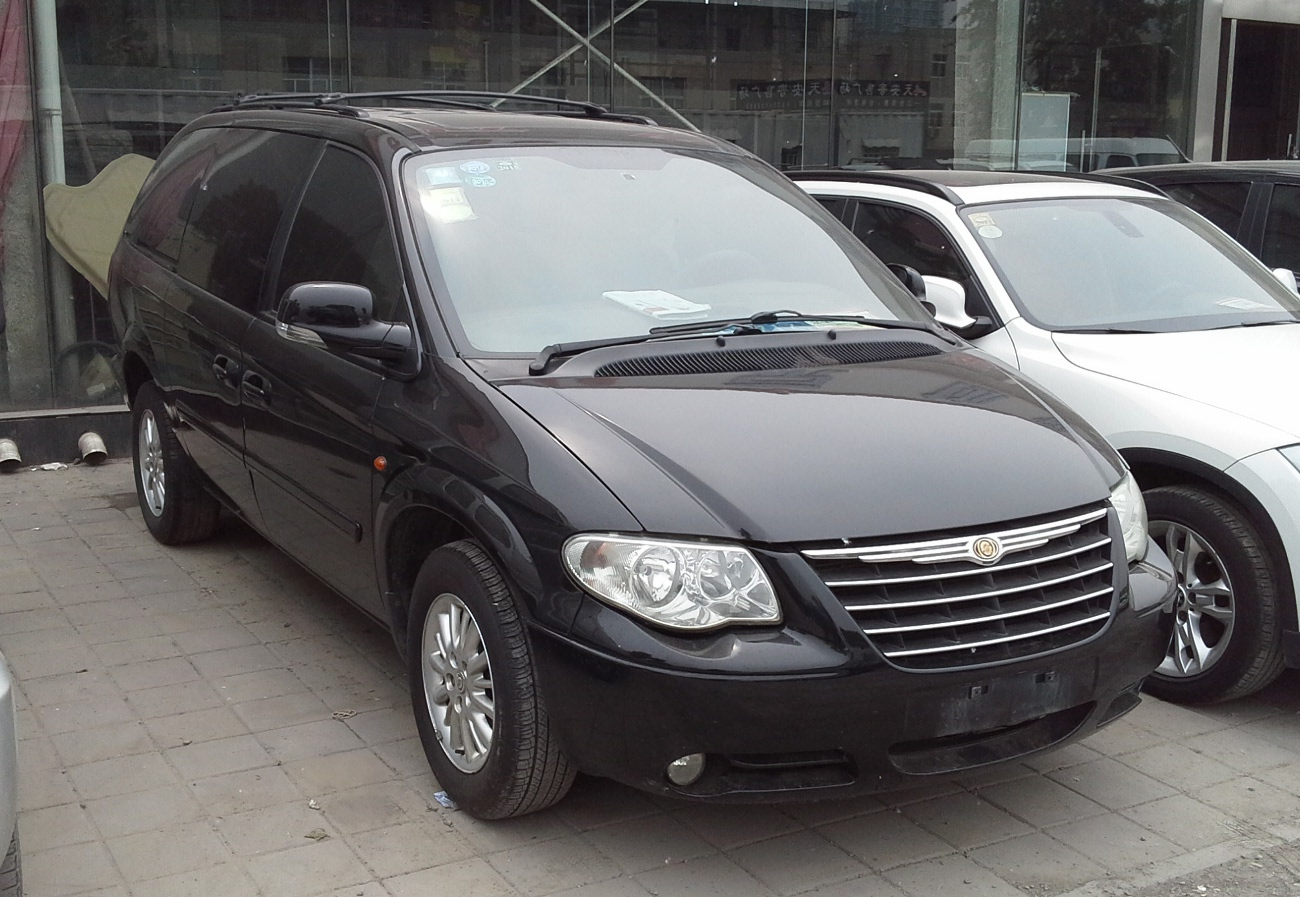
A Soueast Chrysler-made Chrysler Grand Voyager RS van in a used car market in Beijing in 2014.

The Automotive industry in China had contracted when vehicle sales declined with 28 million vehicles in 2018, which represented an annual drop of 2.76%. This was the first decline in the industry seen since 1990 due to falling sales and the effects of the China–United States trade war with US$200 billion raised on Chinese-made products.

The concept of exporting used Chinese-made vehicles were made public in April 2019 when the Chinese Ministry of Commerce, the Ministry of Public Security, and the General Administration of Customs jointly issued a public notice on Supporting the Export of Used Cars in Conditionally Mature Areas. These are responsible for certifying the export of used cars from China.

On May 6, 2019, it was reported that the Chinese Ministry of Commerce officially announced the approval of legally exporting used Chinese vehicles in an effort to increase domestic sales and promote trade in the automotive market. MOFCOM has mentioned that they'll work in identifying companies that can handles vehicle exports and for testing standards to ensure that the used cars are sold safely. In a MOFCOM press conference on May 9, 2019, it was mentioned that it is working with officials from the General Administration of Customs and the Ministry of Industry and Information Technology to administer export licensing for vehicles shipped out of China.

In July 2019, it was announced that the first exports consisted of 300 used cars for Cambodia, Myanmar, Nigeria and Russia from Guangdong. The first exports were made through the Nansha Port while others were done via the China-Europe Railway Express.

On September 3, 2019, Tianjin had exported 60 used vehicles with a value of US$700,000 from the Dongjiang Free Trade Port Zone to the Port of Apapa in Nigeria.

In November 2019, an export of 500 used cars were reported to be sold to Benin for US$3 million from Guangdong. A statement released by Guangdong Good Car Holdings Co. Ltd. on November 21, 2019, says that it was the most valuable order received for the export of used cars. On November 11, 2019, it was reported that some used vehicles were sold to Kyrgyzstan.

In 2021, exports of used Chinese-made vehicles were sold with a total of 2.01 million vehicles.

On July 7, 2022, Chinese officials have said that they will look at measures to help facilitate the sale of used vehicles.

== Designated locations ==
Ten cities, including Beijing, Shanghai and Guangdong, were announced to be designated areas where used vehicles can be legally exported from. Xi'an and Tianjin were also designated as export cities.

== Effects ==
According to Alan Kang, an analyst at LMC Automotive, exports of Chinese vehicles overseas will have a medium- to long-term effect in helping Chinese automobile manufacturers "smoothen sales of new cars".

Sales of used Chinese vehicles to emerging markets would drive down prices, making an impact on new cars being sold and manufactured. They would be preferable to persons who want to buy cheaper vehicles. This gives Chinese vehicle manufacturers a chance to sell any vehicles that may run into trouble with the State VI vehicle emission standards that were implemented on July 1, 2019. The market allows the vehicles to be exported to countries that do not have strict standards for vehicles used in their own markets.

== Restrictions ==
=== Canada ===
Transport Canada mandates that all vehicles that are not made in the U.S./made to comply with U.S. Federal Motor Vehicle Safety Standards are only eligible for importation if its age is 15 years old and above.

=== Cayman Islands ===
The Cayman Islands government announced on May 1, 2023, that the cabinet approved, on April 25, 2023, changes in Customs and Border Control (Prohibited Goods) (Amendment) Order, 2023 that restrict the importation of used vehicles from 2016 to 2023. Exceptions are made for classic/antique vehicles and vehicles meant for agricultural work, construction, maintenance or engineering vehicles older than 8 years.

=== Myanmar ===
The Myanma Ministry of Commerce announced strict guidelines on used car exports from China in order to crack down on vehicles that are being sold from China, but are not made in China. Proof that Chinese vehicles sold through imports, new or used, are required to have certified papers that shows that they were manufactured in China.

=== Ukraine ===
The Verkhovna Rada, in 2006, prohibits imports of used cars that are more than eight years old, except if they're used for humanitarian purposes. Vehicles have to meet at least Euro 2 emission standards and above.

=== United States ===
With the exception of Show or Display or Canadian-market vehicles, the United States does not allow the import of a vehicle unless it's 25 years old.
