= Lu Jintang =

President Lu Jintang 卢金堂
- Born: 1910; Gaocheng, Zhili, Qing dynasty, China
- Died: 1986 (aged 75–76); Beijing, People's Republic of China
- Occupations: Educator, Politician, Soldier
- Spouse: Ma Lantian
- Children: Lu Jianqiang

Lu Jintang (Chinese: 卢金堂; pinyin: Lú Jīntáng; 1910–March 16, 1986) was a Chinese politician and educator. Lu joined the Chinese Communist Party in June 1930, and he was the guerrilla leader of the Chinese Communist Party in Gaocheng during the Second Sino-Japanese War.

Lu was the Principal of Hebei Zhengding High School (1947-1950) and the president of Hebei Beijing Normal College (today's Hebei Normal University) before the founding of the People's Republic of China.

Lu later served as the Direct of the Bureau of Education of Baoding city government and the first principal of Experimental Middle School attached to Hebei Normal University (1956-1966).

He was also a member of the first, second and third of the Beijing Municipal People's Congress.
