= Muyang =

Muyang may refer to the following:

- Muyang language, Afro-Asiatic language
- Cheng Muyang, Chinese businessman
- Larry Muyang, Filipino basketball player
