= Party Secretary of Hebei =

Provincial government position in China

Secretary of the Hebei Provincial Committee of the Chinese Communist Party
- 中国共产党河北省委员会书记
- Emblem of the Chinese Communist Party

- Flag of the Chinese Communist Party

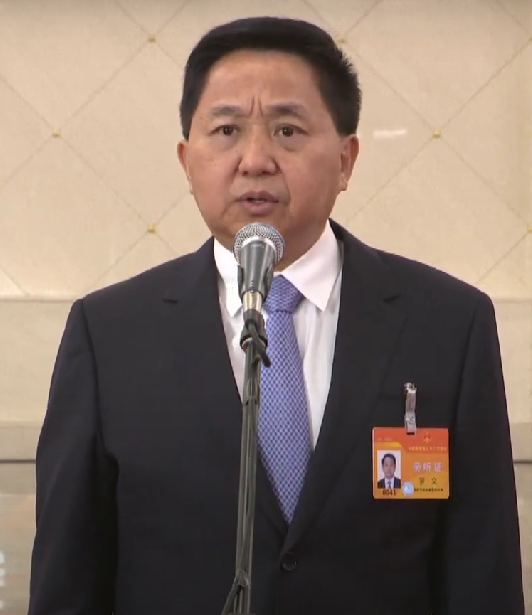
- Incumbent; Luo Wen since 31 July 2026
- Hebei Provincial Committee of the Chinese Communist Party
- Type: Party Committee Secretary
- Status: Provincial and ministerial-level official
- Member of: Hebei Provincial Standing Committee
- Nominator: Central Committee
- Appointer: Hebei Provincial Committee; Central Committee
- Inaugural holder: Lin Tie
- Formation: September 1949
- Deputy: Deputy Secretary; Secretary-General

The secretary of the Hebei Provincial Committee of the Chinese Communist Party is the leader of the Hebei Provincial Committee of the Chinese Communist Party (CCP). As the CCP is the sole ruling party of the People's Republic of China (PRC), the secretary is the highest ranking post in Hebei.

The secretary is officially appointed by the CCP Central Committee based on the recommendation of the CCP Organization Department, which is then approved by the Politburo and its Standing Committee. The secretary can be also appointed by a plenary meeting of the Hebei Provincial Committee, but the candidate must be the same as the one approved by the central government. The secretary leads the Standing Committee of the Hebei Provincial Committee, and is usually a member of the CCP Central Committee. The secretary leads the work of the Provincial Committee and its Standing Committee. The secretary is outranks the governor, who is generally the deputy secretary of the committee.

The current secretary is Luo Wen, who took office on 31 July 2026.

== List of party secretaries ==
No.	Image	Name	Term start	Term end	Ref.
1		Lin Tie (1904–1989)	September 1949	August 1966	
2		Liu Zihou (1909–2001)	August 1966	December 1979	
3		Jin Ming (1913–1998)	December 1979	June 1982	
4		Gao Yang (1909–2009)	June 1982	May 1985	
5		Xing Chongzhi (1927–2000)	May 1985	January 1993	
6		Cheng Weigao (1933–2010)	27 January 1993	8 October 1998	
7		Ye Liansong (born 1935)	October 1998	June 2000	
8		Wang Xudong (born 1946)	June 2000	December 2002	
9		Bai Keming (born 1943)	November 2002	August 2007	
10		Zhang Yunchuan (born 1946)	August 2007	August 2011	
11		Zhang Qingli (born 1951)	28 August 2011	20 March 2013	
12		Zhou Benshun (born 1953)	20 March 2013	31 July 2015	
13		Zhao Kezhi (born 1953)	31 July 2015	28 October 2017	
14		Wang Dongfeng (born 1958)	28 October 2017	22 April 2022	
15		Ni Yuefeng (born 1964)	22 April 2022	31 July 2026	
16		Luo Wen (born 1964)	31 July 2026	Incumbent	
