= Wu Jichuan =

Chinese politician

- 吴基传

Minister of Information Industry
- In office March 1998 – March 2003
- Premier: Zhu Rongji
- Preceded by: New title
- Succeeded by: Wang Xudong

Minister of Posts and Telecommunications
- In office March 1993 – March 1998
- Premier: Li Peng
- Preceded by: Lu Si
- Succeeded by: Position revoked

Personal details
- Born: October 1937 (age 88–89) Changning County, Hunan, China
- Party: Chinese Communist Party
- Education: Beijing University of Posts and Telecommunications; Peking University

Chinese name
- Simplified Chinese: 吴基传
- Traditional Chinese: 吳基傳
Transcriptions
Standard Mandarin
- Hanyu Pinyin: Wú Jīchuán

Wu Jichuan (Chinese: 吴基传; born October 1937) is a Chinese politician who served as minister of posts and telecommunications from 1993 to 1998 and minister of information industry from 1998 to 2003.

He was a delegate to the 8th, 9th, and 10th National People's Congress. He was an alternate member of the 14th Central Committee of the Chinese Communist Party and a member of the 15th Central Committee of the Chinese Communist Party.

== Biography ==
Wu was born in Changning County (now Changning), Hunan, in October 1937. In 1956, he entered Beijing University of Posts and Telecommunications, majoring in telegraphic communication. After graduation, he stayed and worked at the university.

He joined the Chinese Communist Party (CCP) in July 1960. Since September 1965, he served in various posts in the Ministry of Posts and Telecommunications. He moved up the ranks to become vice minister in October 1984 and minister in March 1993, interspersed with short terms as deputy party secretary of Henan from June 1990 to February 1993. In March 1998, he became minister of the newly founded information industry, a post he kept until March 2003.

In March 2003, he took office as vice chairperson of the National People's Congress Education, Science, Culture and Public Health Committee.

== Personal life ==
He married Gong Shuangjin (龚双瑾), a communication transmission expert who gave birth to two daughters.

Government offices
Preceded by Lu Si	Minister of Posts and Telecommunications; 1993–1998	Succeeded by Position revoked
New title	Minister of Information Industry; 1998–2003	Succeeded by Wang Xudong
Academic offices
Preceded by Hu Qili	President of the Chinese Institute of Electronics; 2002–2012	Succeeded by Lou Qinjian
