= Yang Yue =

Chinese politician

Yang Yue 杨岳

Communist Party Secretary of Fuzhou
- In office April 2013 – June 2016
- Preceded by: Yuan Rongxiang
- Succeeded by: Ni Yuefeng

Personal details
- Born: July 1968 (age 58) Xingcheng, Liaoning, China
- Party: Chinese Communist Party
- Education: Tsinghua University

Yang Yue (Chinese: 杨岳; pinyin: Yáng Yuè; born July 1968) is a Chinese politician, and the current head of the United Front Work Department of the Jiangsu provincial organization of the Chinese Communist Party. He previously held office as Communist Party Secretary of Fuzhou and Vice Governor of Jiangsu. Yang had extensive background in the Communist Youth League. He was an alternate of the 18th Central Committee of the Chinese Communist Party.

== Biography ==
Yang was born in 1968 in Ningyuan, Liaoning province (since renamed "Xingcheng"). He attended the No. 8 Middle School in Anshan, Liaoning. He majored in mechanics and precision instruments at Tsinghua University in Beijing where he graduated in 1990. He joined the Chinese Communist Party (CCP) in June 1986, while attending university. He then went on to obtain a master's degree in engineering in 1996.

Yang served as a political instructor at Tsinghua shortly after obtaining his master's degree. By 1997 he was named Secretary of the Communist Youth League of Tsinghua University, at age 28. He then served as deputy party chief of Tongzhou District, Beijing. In December 2001 he was named to the Secretariat of the Communist Youth League; he served in the role for three years. In January 2004 he became vice-chairman of the All-China Youth Federation. He became an executive secretary at the CYL in January 2006, as well as the head of the office in charge of youth engagement. In March 2008 he joined the Standing Committee of the National People's Congress. In June 2008 he was named a vice-minister level executive secretary of the CYL Secretariat.

In December 2008, he was named a Standing Member of the Fujian CCP Committee, then became Secretary-General of the party organization in Fujian (vice-governor administrative ranking). In September 2011 he became Party Secretary of Fuzhou, capital of the province.

Given his relative youth and Communist Youth League background, it was said that Yang Yue was destined for higher office. In June 2016, Yang was transferred to Jiangsu to become vice-governor. He was not re-elected and left office as vice-governor in 2018. In April 2018, he was made head of the United Front Work Department of Jiangsu.

Yang was one of the youngest alternate of the 18th Central Committee of the Chinese Communist Party.
