= Wang Daobang =

Chinese People's Liberation Army General

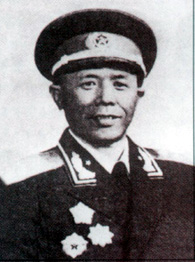
Wang Daobang (1955)

Wang Daobang (Chinese: 王道邦) (November 23, 1911 – November 12, 1959) was a People's Liberation Army lieutenant general. He was born in Yongxin County, Jiangxi. He was commander of the People's Liberation Army's Hebei Military District from 1957 to 1959.

Preceded by Peng Mingzhi	Commander of the People's Liberation Army Hebei Military District; 1957–1959	Succeeded by Xiao Siming
