= Cheng Muyang =

Chinese businessman (born 1969)

- 程慕阳
- Born: 14 November 1969 (age 56); Suzhou, Jiangsu
- Other names: Michael Ching, Mo-yeung Ching
- Occupations: Businessman and property developer
- Spouse: Song Xiangqi (aka Heung Kei Sung) (宋香祺)
- Children: 3 daughters
- Relatives: Cheng Weigao (father)

Cheng Muyang (Chinese: 程慕阳; born 14 November 1969), also known as Michael Mo-yeung Ching, is a Chinese Canadian businessman and property developer. Son of Cheng Weigao, former Communist Party Secretary of Hebei Province, Ching maintained a network of businesses across mainland China and Hong Kong under his father's political patronage in the 1990s. He moved to Canada in 2000 shortly before he was placed on China's wanted list for corruption. In 2015, Interpol issued a Red Notice for him at China's request, but revoked it in 2018, stating that the information provided by China did not comply with its policies. In 2020, a Canadian tribunal concluded that the Chinese allegations against Ching had not been substantiated. He was subsequently granted Canadian citizenship after nearly twenty years of legal proceedings.

== Biography ==
Ching was born on November 14, 1969, as one of three children and the only son of Cheng Weigao, who at the time was the head of a tractor factory in Changzhou, Jiangsu Province. As Cheng's political career developed, Ching moved to Henan in 1987, when Cheng became Henan's vice party chief and governor. Ching graduated from Zhengzhou Industrial College, majoring in computer science, in 1991. The same year, through his father's connections in Nanjing, where Cheng had been the mayor, he joined the Beijing office of a Nanjing television factory. Ching resigned the next year to become a businessman. In 1993, he acquired permanent residence in Hong Kong.

Ching was credited as a producer for the popular Chinese television drama Guo Ba Yin (1993), adapted from a novel by Wang Shuo, after he helped raise 500,000 yuan in sponsorship from several state-owned enterprises in Hebei to fund the production. During filming, Ching developed a romantic relationship with actress Liu Bei. Ching sought his father's consent to marry Liu, but Cheng disapproved, preferring that his son marry someone from a "working-class background." After learning of his father's opposition, Liu ended the relationship. According to journalist Shi Jian, a mentor of Ching before he fell out of favor with the Cheng family, Ching's breakup was followed by a period of emotional distress, during which Ching indulged in nightlife and gambling.

During that period, Ching frequently traveled to Shenzhen and Macau to gamble. On one of those trips, he met Song Xiangqi, then a student from an industrial college in Baotou, Inner Mongolia, whose father had worked at Baogang Group and later at the Baotou Economic Commission. They married in 1995. The couple have three daughters.

In 1996, Ching obtained permanent residency through investment in Canada. Ching left China with his wife and children in July 2000 for Vancouver, Canada, where he continued to be a businessman, active in real estate development, mainly through two companies, Mo Yeung International and Sunwins. His notable projects include the International Trade Centre, a three-tower mixed-use development in Richmond. In 2012, he was among the recipients of Queen Elizabeth II's Diamond Jubilee Medal, awarded for significant contributions to the community. He has also been an active member of the Richmond Lion's Club, and a donor to various charitable causes.

After 2015, Ching maintained a low public profile following the issuance of an Interpol Red Notice at the request of Chinese authorities, a period during which his business activities were also affected. The notice was withdrawn in 2018, after which he gradually reappeared in public. In 2021, Ching opened the Versante, a boutique hotel with 100 rooms, as part of the International Trade Centre in Richmond. In January 2024, foreclosure proceedings were initiated against the hotel in relation to a loan agreement entered into in 2021, and the Supreme Court of British Columbia granted the foreclosure on 29 February 2024. In March 2025, the court placed the hotel, Ching's flagship asset, and its parent company, International Trade Centre Properties Ltd., under receivership, appointing Deloitte Restructuring Inc. as receiver, citing mounting debt, cash-flow constraints, and concerns over potential asset transfers among related entities controlled by Ching. The hotel was sold through a court-supervised process in October 2025, following competitive bidding, at a price of CAD 51.5 million, below the outstanding debt.

== Controversy ==
Throughout the 1990s, while his father Cheng Weigao served as Communist Party Secretary of Hebei province, Ching was reported to have lived a lavish lifestyle financed through a network of businesses established under his father's political patronage. The Chinese government alleged that he had created more than thirty companies with little or no capital investment, amassing assets valued at hundreds of millions of yuan.

In 1996, Ching obtained Canadian permanent residency through the immigrant-investor program. After the arrest of Li Zhen, Cheng's former secretary and Ching's business associate, Ching left China for Canada in 2000, shortly before the Hebei provincial procuratorate issued a warrant for his arrest. In August 2003, as a result of a sweeping corruption scandal across Hebei, Cheng Weigao was expelled from the Communist Party and removed from his ministerial-level post, though he was allowed to retire with vice-ministerial rank. In 2006, the Central Commission for Discipline Inspection concluded that there was insufficient evidence to pursue criminal charges against Cheng.

When Cheng Weigao died in 2010, Ching's wife and daughters returned to China for the funeral, but Ching did not because of the outstanding warrant. He attended the memorial remotely via a laptop held by one of his daughters. After Cheng's death, Ching's mother, Zhang Peifei, continued writing to the central government and relevant departments seeking to have the warrant lifted, without success.

Ching denied all allegations by China, claiming that his father and him were the targets of political persecution. He twice applied for Canadian citizenship, in 2001 and 2004, but withdrew his second application in 2009 after years of delay. He applied for refugee status in 2012 but the claim was denied in 2014. Ching then filed a C$1.75 million lawsuit against the Canadian government, alleging conspiracy and unfair treatment. In July 2015, Federal Court Justice Yvan Roy ordered the Immigration and Refugee Board to reconsider Ching's case, ruling that the board had relied too heavily on unsubstantiated findings from Chinese courts. In 2018, Interpol removed Ching's name from its list of wanted fugitives, stating that the information provided by China did not comply with its policies.

Ching filed a defamation lawsuit against the South China Morning Post and reporter Ian Young over their 2015 coverage of his case, which cited a later retracted Canadian immigration-department statement referring to Ching as a "criminal" and "fraudster." In 2020, a Canadian tribunal held that the Chinese allegations against Ching had not been proven. The defamation lawsuit was settled later that year, with Ching and SCMP jointly donating $50,000 to the Richmond Hospital Foundation. After nearly twenty years of legal proceedings, Ching was granted Canadian citizenship in December 2020.
