= Zhao Chenxin =

Chinese politician

- 赵辰昕

Governor of Hebei
- Acting
- Assumed office 25 October 2026
- Party Secretary: Luo Wen
- Preceded by: Wang Zhengpu

Standing Deputy Governor of Hebei
- In office June 2025 – 25 October 2026
- Governor: Wang Zhengpu
- Preceded by: Zhang Chengzhong
- Succeeded by: Chen Shaobo

Personal details
- Born: September 1969 (age 57) Raoyang County, Hebei, China
- Party: Chinese Communist Party
- Education: Peking University (LL.D.)

Zhao Chenxin (Chinese: 赵辰昕; born September 1969) is a Chinese politician, currently serving as the deputy secretary of the Hebei Provincial Committee of the Chinese Communist Party and the governor of Hebei since October 2026. Previously he was served as the standing deputy governor of Hebei. He is a delegate to the 20th National Congress of the Chinese Communist Party.

== Career ==
Zhao was born in Raoyang County, Hebei in September 1969. He was enrolled to the politicial department of Peking University in 1988 and earned the doctor of laws. In 1991, he was served as the student council president of the PKU. From 1992 to 1994, Zhao was served as an officer of the organization department of the CCP Zhucheng Committee in Shandong.

In 1997, Zhao was served as an officer of the State Commission for Restructuring the Economic System, and transferred to the Secretariat of the General Office of the Chinese Communist Party in 1998.

In 2003, Zhao was served as the head of the publicity department of the party committee for directly affiliated organs of the National Development and Reform Commission. He also served as the deputy inspector and the deputy secretary until 2015.

In 2015, Zhao was appointed as the deputy director of the research institute and the spokesperson of the NDRC. He was appointed as the director of the bureau of economic operation regulation in December 2016, and the deputy secretariat in April 2019.

In September 2020, Zhao was appointed as the secretariat of the NDRC.

In April 2024, Zhao was appointed as the deputy director of the NDRC.

In 2025, Zhao was appointed as the standing member of the Hebei Provincial Committee of the Chinese Communist Party, and the standing deputy governor of Hebei.

On 24 October 2026, Zhao was appointed as the deputy secretary of the CCP Hebei Committee, the secretary of the Hebei Provincial People's Government. He was appointed as the acting governor of Hebei on 25 October.

Government offices
| Preceded by Zhang Chengzhong | Standing Deputy Governor of Hebei; 2025–2026 | Succeeded by Chen Shaobo |
| Preceded by Wang Zhengpu | Governor of Hebei; 2026– | Incumbent |
