= Lin Tie =

Chinese politician

- 林铁
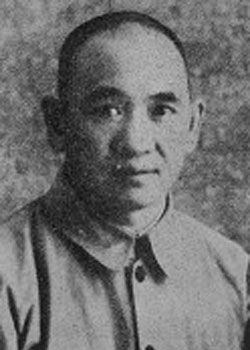
- Lin Tie in 1949

First Secretary of Hebei
- In office 12 June 1949 – 25 August 1966
- Preceded by: New title
- Succeeded by: Liu Zihou

Governor of Hebei
- In office 15 November 1952 – 16 April 1958
- Preceded by: Yang Xiufeng
- Succeeded by: Liu Zihou

Personal details
- Born: November 1904 Wanxian, Sichuan, Qing China
- Died: 17 August 1989 (aged 84) Beijing, PR China
- Party: Chinese Communist Party

Lin Tie (Chinese: 林铁; November 1904 – 17 August 1989) was a Communist revolutionary leader and politician of the People's Republic of China (PRC). He served as the first Chinese Communist Party Committee Secretary and the second Governor of Hebei province of the PRC, but was purged in 1966 at the beginning of the Cultural Revolution.

== Communist revolution ==
Lin Tie was born in November 1904 to an educated family in Wanxian, Sichuan province (now Wanzhou District, Chongqing). Born Liu Shude (刘树德), he also used the pseudonyms Li Te (李特) and Zhao Fu (赵福).

Lin entered Wanxian Middle School in 1918 and then Chongqing United High School in 1922, where he was influenced by the Communist youth leaders Yun Daiying and Xiao Chunü (萧楚女). After graduating from high school in 1925, Lin went to Beijing and attended China University, Sino-Russian University, and the University of Law and Politics (all defunct). In November 1925 he joined the Chinese Communist Party (CCP) at the University of Law and Politics.

In Spring 1928 Lin was dispatched by the CCP to Paris, France, where he enrolled at the University of Paris. He continued to participate in revolutionary and union activities in Paris, and was soon deported by the French government. He left for Belgium, but was again deported by that country. In January 1932 he was sent to the Soviet Union to study at the International Lenin School and later the Communist University of the Toilers of the East, two Communist cadre training schools in Moscow. He returned to China in late 1935.

During the Second Sino-Japanese War, Lin Tie stayed in the Beijing-Tianjin area and helped establish the Hebei CCP committee in 1937. During the subsequent Chinese Civil War, Lin was the Party Chief of Central Hebei and the Political Commissar of the Central Hebei Military Region.

== People's Republic of China ==
After the CCP defeated the Kuomintang in the Pingjin Campaign, the Hebei Provincial Committee of the Chinese Communist Party was established on 12 July 1949, and Lin Tie was appointed the provincial party chief. The People's Republic of China was soon established on 1 October. Lin later also assumed the post of Governor, the number two post in the government hierarchy, but Liu Zihou took over that position in April 1958. Liu was a proponent of class struggle and was praised by Chairman Mao Zedong. Lin Tie, on the other hand, was a proponent of modernization. In 1958, Lin successfully lobbied the central government to approve moving the Hebei provincial capital from the more agrarian Baoding to metropolitan Tianjin (now a direct-controlled municipality separate from Hebei). Lin wanted to utilize Tianjin's industry and educational resources to help modernize the rural areas, but his plans were derailed by Mao Zedong's disastrous Great Leap Forward.

In May 1966, Mao Zedong purged Politburo member, Beijing party chief Peng Zhen and started the decade-long Cultural Revolution. As Lin Tie was associated with the political network of Peng Zhen, Governor Liu Zihou took the opportunity to make a bid for the top office of Hebei. Liu courted Li Xuefeng, party chief of North China which includes Hebei province, and denounced Lin Tie. Lin was stripped of all his positions and imprisoned in a military compound. Liu subsequently persecuted many war heroes including his own former associates, resulting in at least 33 deaths.

By January 1967, the capital of Hebei had been moved back to Baoding from Tianjin. When Liu Zihou arrived in Baoding, he was attacked and detained by rebel Red Guards, which included supporters of Lin Tie. On 29 January, the red guards of the August First faction paraded Liu on a truck for five hours, which was witnessed by a million people. On 11 February, the 69th Army of the People's Liberation Army commanded by General Xie Zhenhua jailed 1000 members of the August First red guards, and restored Liu Zihou to power.

In 1967 Lin Tie's former subordinates in Hebei denounced Liu Shaoqi, the fallen president of China, as China's Khrushchev, and Lin Tie as Liu's agent in Hebei. Vice Governor Yang Lichen, Lin's former lieutenant, was persecuted to death.

After the end of the Cultural Revolution in 1976 and the rise to power of reformer Deng Xiaoping, Lin Tie was rehabilitated. In 1982 he was elected a member of the Central Advisory Commission. On 17 September 1989, Lin Tie died in Beijing, aged 84.

Lin was a member of the 8th Central Committee of the Chinese Communist Party.

== Notes ==
New title	First Secretary of Hebei; 1949–1966	Succeeded by Liu Zihou
Preceded by Yang Xiufeng	Governor of Hebei; 1952–1958	Succeeded by Liu Zihou
