= Tang Zhiguo =

Chinese politician

- 唐志国

Communist Party Secretary of Liaoyang
- In office November 2010 – September 2014
- Preceded by: Sun Yuanliang
- Succeeded by: Wang Zhengpu

Mayor of Liaoyang
- In office September 2004 – November 2010
- Preceded by: Sun Yuanliang
- Succeeded by: Wang Zhengpu

Personal details
- Born: October 1954 (age 71–72) Baodi County, Tianjin, China
- Party: Chinese Communist Party (1975–2024; expelled)
- Education: Jinzhou Railway Driver School; Central Party School of the Chinese Communist Party; Liaoning University

Chinese name
- Simplified Chinese: 唐志国
- Traditional Chinese: 唐志國
Transcriptions
Standard Mandarin
- Hanyu Pinyin: Táng Zhìguó

Tang Zhiguo (Chinese: 唐志国; born October 1954) is a former Chinese politician who spent his entire career in northeast China's Liaoning province. He was investigated by China's top anti-graft agency in May 2024. He has been retired for 10 years. Previously he served as party secretary of Liaoyang. He was a delegate to the 11th National People's Congress.

== Biography ==
Tang was born in Baodi County (now Baodi District), Tianjin, in October 1954. After studying for a year at Jinzhou Railway Driver School in 1972, he became a vehicle fitter in the repair workshop of Shanhaiguan railway. He joined the Chinese Communist Party (CCP) in 1975. In December 1975, he was transferred to Jinzhou Railway Bureau, becoming an editor of Jinzhou Railway newspaper. He was despatched to Jinzhou Municipal Human Resources Bureau in September 1983, where he moved up the ranks to become deputy director of the Office in June 1985 and director of the Office in March 1986. He was deputy director of the Comprehensive Department of the Jinzhou Municipal Government Office in April 1987 and subsequently leader of the preparatory group of Jinxi Personnel Supervision Bureau in September 1989. He served as magistrate of Suizhong County from March 1995 to March 1997, and party secretary, the top political position in the county, from March 1997 to October 1998. He became Head of the Organization Department of the CCP Huludao Municipal Committee in October 1998 before being assigned to the similar position in Liaoyang in February 2000. He was promoted to mayor of Liaoyang in September 2004, and then party secretary, the top political position in the city, beginning in October 2010.

In March 2024, Tang was expelled from the CCP and his retirement benefits were cancelled for Discipline Inspection for alleged "serious violations of discipline and laws" by the Central Commission for Discipline Inspection (CCDI), the party's internal disciplinary body, and the National Supervisory Commission, the highest anti-corruption agency of China.

Government offices
Preceded by Sun Yuanliang	Mayor of Liaoyang; 2004–2010	Succeeded by Wang Zhengpu
Party political offices
Preceded by Sun Yuanliang	Communist Party Secretary of Liaoyang; 2010–2014	Succeeded by Wang Zhengpu
