= Peng Mingzhi =

Chinese general and diplomat

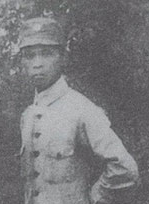
- Peng Mingzhi (1941)
- Born: 6 April 1905
- Died: 10 May 1993 (aged 88)
- Occupations: lieutenant general and diplomat
- Known for: first Ambassador of the People's Republic of China to Poland (1950–1952)
- Notable work: Commander of the People's Liberation Army's Hebei Military District (1952–1957)

Peng Mingzhi (Chinese: 彭明治) (6 April 1905 – 10 May 1993) was a People's Liberation Army lieutenant general and Chinese diplomat. He was born in Changning, Hunan. He was the first Ambassador of the People's Republic of China to Poland (1950–1952). He was Commander of the People's Liberation Army's Hebei Military District (1952–1957). He was a member of the Standing Committee of the National People's Congress from March 1978 to June 1983 and died in 1993.

Diplomatic posts
New title	Ambassador of China to Poland; 1950–1952	Succeeded by Zeng Yongquan
Military offices
Preceded by Wang Guanghua	Commander of the People's Liberation Army Hebei Military District; 1952–1957	Succeeded by Wang Daobang
