= Sun Yuanliang (politician) =

Chinese politician

- 孙远良

Vice Chairman of the Liaoning Provincial Committee of the Chinese People's Political Consultative Conference
- In office January 2013 – January 2018
- Chairman: Xia Deren

Head of the United Front Work Department of the Liaoning Provincial Committee of the Chinese Communist Party
- In office December 2011 – October 2016
- Preceded by: Gao Peng
- Succeeded by: Fan Jiying

Secretary-General of the Liaoning Provincial Committee of the Chinese People's Political Consultative Conference
- In office January 2011 – December 2011
- Preceded by: Wei Min
- Succeeded by: Shi Guiru

Communist Party Secretary of Liaoyang
- In office August 2004 – October 2010
- Preceded by: Chen Shinan
- Succeeded by: Tang Zhiguo

Mayor of Liaoyang
- In office January 2001 – August 2004
- Preceded by: Chen Shinan
- Succeeded by: Tang Zhiguo

Personal details
- Born: March 1955 (age 71) Jianping County, Liaoning, China
- Party: Chinese Communist Party (1976–2022; expelled)
- Education: Liaoning University

Chinese name
- Simplified Chinese: 孙远良
- Traditional Chinese: 孫遠良
Transcriptions
Standard Mandarin
- Hanyu Pinyin: Sūn Yuǎnliáng

Sun Yuanliang (Chinese: 孙远良; born March 1955) is a former Chinese politician who spent most of his career in northeast China's Liaoning province. As of April 2022 he was under investigation by China's top anti-graft watchdog. He retired in 2018. Previously he served as vice chairman of the Liaoning Provincial Committee of the Chinese People's Political Consultative Conference.

Sun was a delegate to the 10th National People's Congress. He was a member of the 12th National Committee of the Chinese People's Political Consultative Conference. He was a representative of the 17th National Congress of the Chinese Communist Party.

== Early life and education ==
Sun was born in Jianping County, Liaoning, in March 1955. In 1973, he enrolled at Liaoning University, majoring in Russian language.

== Career ==
Sun joined the Chinese Communist Party (CCP) in August 1976. After university in September 1976, he became a secretary for the Office of CCP Nagqu Prefectural Committee in southwest China's Xizang Autonomous Region.

Sun was transferred to Liaoyang in July 1982, where he successively served as office secretary (1983), deputy director of the Office (1983–1984), deputy party secretary and governor of Shuangta District (1984–1985), secretary-general of the CCP Liaoyang Municipal Committee (1985–1994), deputy party secretary of Liaoyang (1994–2004), mayor of Liaoyang (2001–2004), and eventually party secretary of Liaoyang (2004–2010).

In December 2010, Sun took up the post of director of the Office of the Liaoning Provincial Committee of the Chinese People's Political Consultative Conference, the provincial advisory body. He was chosen as secretary-general in January 2011, but having held the position for only eleven months. In December 2011, he was appointed as head of the United Front Work Department of the CCP Liaoning Provincial Committee, in addition to serving as vice chairman of the Liaoning Provincial Committee of the Chinese People's Political Consultative Conference since January 2013. He retired in January 2018.

== Downfall ==
On 9 April 2022, Sun was put under investigation for alleged "serious violations of discipline and laws" by the Central Commission for Discipline Inspection (CCDI), the party's internal disciplinary body, and the National Supervisory Commission, the highest anti-corruption agency of China. On September 30, he was expelled from the CCP. He was detained by the Supreme People's Procuratorate on October 29.

On 28 February 2023, Sun was indicted on suspicion of accepting bribes. On November 30, his trial was held at the Intermediate People's Court in Chengde, Hebei. Prosecutors accused Sun of taking advantage of his different positions in Liaoning between 1994 and 2018 to seek profits for various companies and individuals in expropriation of land, acquisition of loans and adjustment of positions, in return for bribes paid in cash or gifts worth more than 197 million yuan ($27.26 million) through himself, his son and relatives.

On 9 May 2024, Sun was sentenced to death with a two-year reprieve for taking bribes worth more than 197 million yuan ($27.26 million) by the Intermediate People's Court of Chengde. He was deprived of his political rights for life, and all his personal assets were confiscated.

Government offices
Preceded by Chen Shinan	Mayor of Liaoyang; 2001–2004	Succeeded by Tang Zhiguo
Party political offices
Preceded by Chen Shinan	Communist Party Secretary of Liaoyang; 2004–2010	Succeeded by Tang Zhiguo
Preceded by Gao Peng	Head of the United Front Work Department of the Liaoning Provincial Committee of the Chinese Communist Party; 2011–2016	Succeeded by Fan Jiying
Assembly seats
Preceded by Wei Min (魏敏)	Secretary-General of the Liaoning Provincial Committee of the Chinese People's Political Consultative Conference; 2011	Succeeded by Shi Guiru
