= Yin Zhe =

Chinese politician

Yin Zhe (Chinese: 尹哲) (1916–2005) was a Chinese politician. He was born in Gaoyang County, Hebei. He was Chairman of the CPPCC Committee of his home province and Chinese Communist Party Committee Secretary of Qinhuangdao.

Preceded by Liu Zihou	Chairman of the CPPCC Hebei Committee	Succeeded by Li Wenshan
