= Han Shiqian =

Chinese general

- 韩世谦

Commander of the Hebei Military District
- In office June 1990 – January 1995
- Preceded by: Dong Xuelin
- Succeeded by: Hua Binglai

Personal details
- Born: January 1935 Ding County, Hebei, China
- Died: 8 December 2007 (aged 72) Beijing, China
- Party: Chinese Communist Party

Military service
- Allegiance: People's Republic of China
- Branch/service: People's Liberation Army Ground Force
- Years of service: 1951–1995
- Rank: Major general

Chinese name
- Simplified Chinese: 韩世谦
- Traditional Chinese: 韓世謙
Transcriptions
Standard Mandarin
- Hanyu Pinyin: Han Shiqian

Han Shiqian (Chinese: 韩世谦; January 1935 – 8 December 2007) was a major general in the People's Liberation Army of China. He was a delegate to the 8th National People's Congress.

== Biography ==
Han was born in Ding County (now Dingzhou), Hebei, in January 1935.

Han enlisted in the People's Liberation Army (PLA) in January 1951, and joined the Chinese Communist Party (CCP) in October 1958. He attained the rank of major general (shaojiang) in September 1988. He became commander of the Hebei Military District in June 1990, and served until January 1995.

On 8 December 2007, Han died in Beijing, at the age of 72.

Military offices
Preceded by Dong Xuelin	Commander of the Hebei Military District; 1990–1995	Succeeded by Hua Binglai
