= Li Wenshan =

Chinese politician

- 李文珊

Chairman of the Hebei Provincial Committee of the Chinese People's Political Consultative Conference
- In office 1988–1998
- Preceded by: Yin Zhe
- Succeeded by: Lü Chuanzan

Personal details
- Born: 27 August 1928 Wu'an County, Hebei, China
- Died: 20 February 2014 (aged 85) Shijiazhuang, Hebei, China
- Party: Chinese Communist Party

Li Wenshan (Chinese: 李文珊; 27 August 1928 – 20 February 2014) was a Chinese politician.

== Biography ==
He was born in Wu'an, Hebei. He was CPPCC Committee Chairman of his home province.

Assembly seats
| Preceded by Yin Zhe | Chairman of the Hebei Provincial Committee of the Chinese People's Political Consultative Conference; 1988–1998 | Succeeded by Lu Chuanzan |
