= National Rural Revitalization Administration =

Chinese government agency

- 国家乡村振兴局; Guójiā Xiāngcūn Zhènxīngjú
- National emblem of China

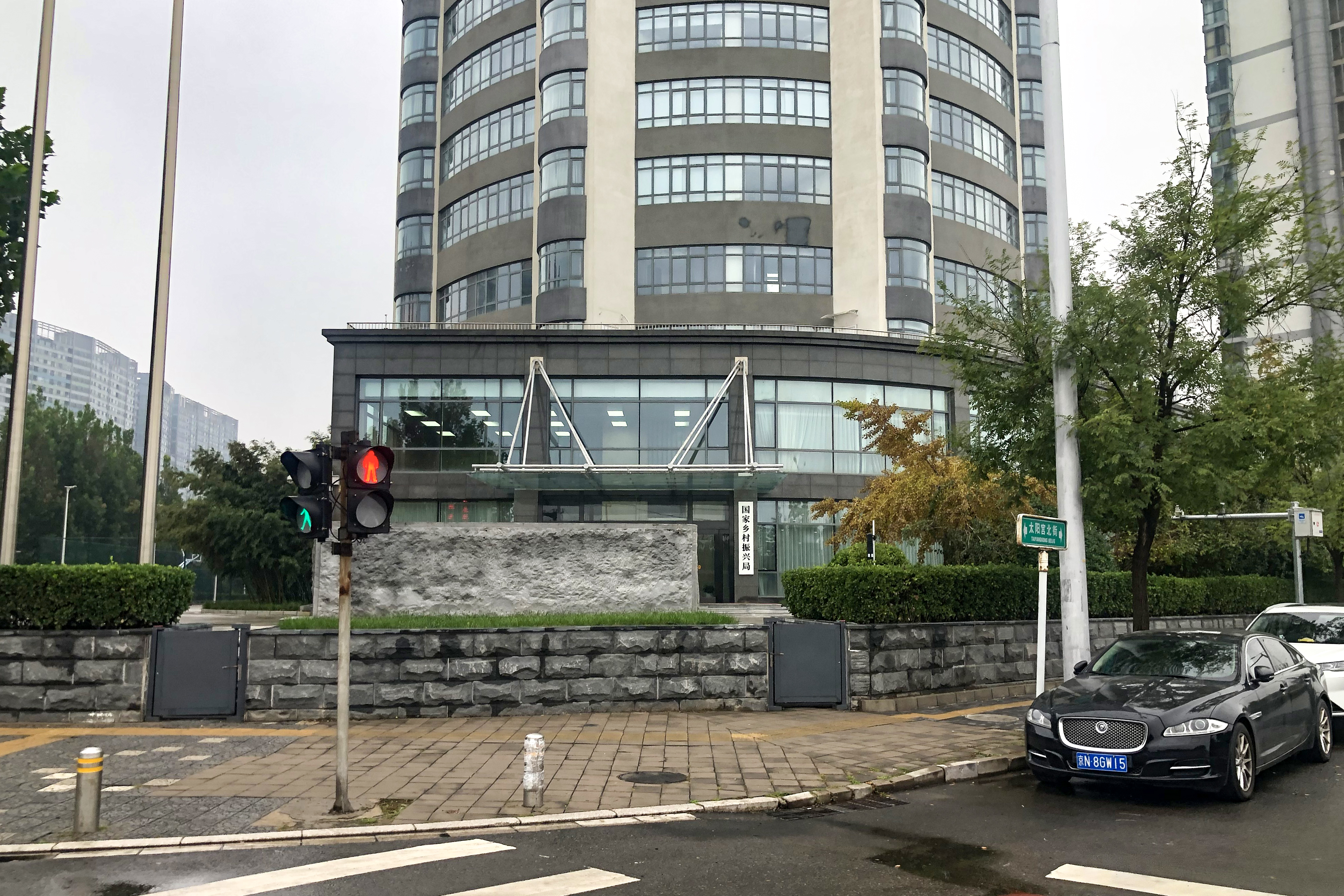

Agency overview
- Formed: February 25, 2021
- Preceding agencies: Office of the Leading Group for Economic Development in Poverty Stricken Areas of the State Council; State Council Leading Group Office of Poverty Alleviation and Development
- Jurisdiction: Ministry of Agriculture and Rural Affairs of the People's Republic of China
- Headquarters: Beijing building_region:China 39°58′11″N 116°26′55″E
- Agency executives: Liu Huanxin, Director; Hong Tianyun, Xia Gengsheng, Deputy Director

Chinese name
- Traditional Chinese: 國家鄉村振興局
- Simplified Chinese: 国家乡村振兴局
Transcriptions
Standard Mandarin
- Hanyu Pinyin: Guójiā Xiāngcūn Zhènxīngjú

The National Rural Revitalization Administration (Chinese: 国家乡村振兴局) is an agency within the Ministry of Agriculture and Rural Affairs of the People's Republic of China which is responsible for China's against poverty and to promote development in rural areas. It is headquartered in Beijing. It was formed on 25 February 2021 as the agency superseding the former State Council Leading Group Office of Poverty Alleviation and Development. In 2023, it was merged into the Ministry of Agriculture and Rural Affairs.

== History ==
On 16 May 1986, the Office of the Leading Group for Economic Development in Poverty Stricken Areas of the State Council (国务院贫困地区经济开发领导小组办公室) was created, which was reshuffled as the State Council Leading Group Office of Poverty Alleviation and Development (国务院扶贫开发领导小组) on 17 September 1993.

Since 2005, the Chinese government has promoted building New Villages to modernize the countryside. In 2008 the Urban and Rural Planning Law was enacted. In 2015, the Guide to Construct Beautiful Countryside was enacted "to achieve benign ecological, social, and economic rural development."

In 2017 the Rural Revitalization Strategy was officially introduced, with the goal of addressing "the imbalance between urban and rural areas and among regions." Rural areas in China also suffer from environmental degradation and brain drain. The Rural Revitalization Strategy has the long-term goals of achieving "decisive progress on rural revitalization" by 2035 and to be "fully rejuvenated with well-off farmers and strong agriculture sectors" by 2050. Although China claims to have eradicated extreme poverty, sustainable poverty alleviation also remains a goal of the strategy.

On 25 February 2021, the State Council Leading Group Office of Poverty Alleviation and Development was renamed to the National Rural Revitalization Administration. Wang Zhengpu was appointed director.

In 2023, it was announced that the Administration's tasks are taken over by the Ministry of Agriculture and Rural Affairs.

== List of directors ==
No.	Name	Took office	Left office	Notes
1	Wang Zhengpu	25 February 2021	October 2021	
2	Liu Huanxin	October 2021		

== See also ==
- International Fund for Agricultural Development
- Xi Jinping Thought (Shared Prosperity)
