= Zhang Xiluan =

Chinese general

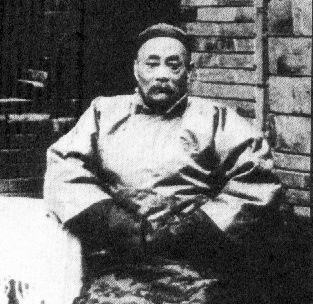
- Born: 1843 Zhejiang Province, Qing Empire
- Died: 1922 (aged 80)
- Allegiance: (Qing dynasty) Qing Dynasty

Zhang Xiluan (Chinese: 張錫鑾) (1843–1922) was a Chinese general of the late Qing dynasty. Zhang joined the Hunan Army in 1864. He also served as the governor of Fengtian province beginning in 1913 and was the top military authority in Manchuria, appointed Governor General of all Manchurian Provinces by Yuan Shikai. He was also the rival of the politician and warlord Zhang Zuolin.
