= Rong Zhen =

Chinese military commander (1891–1960)

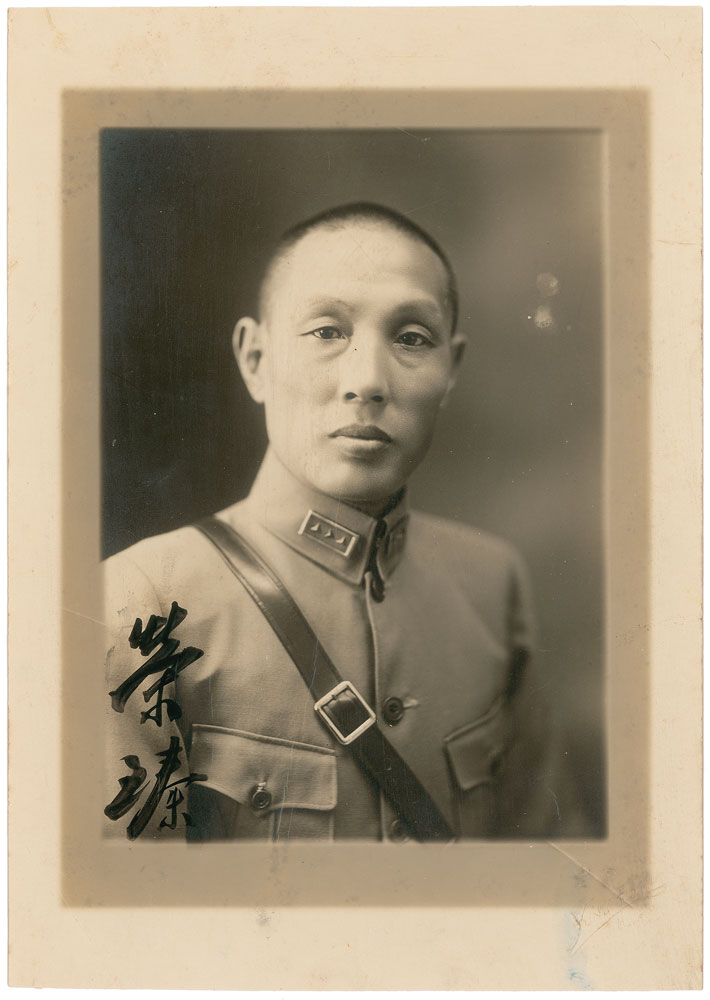

Rong Zhen (traditional Chinese: 榮臻; simplified Chinese: 荣臻; pinyin: Róng Zhēn; Wade–Giles: Jung Chen) (1891–1960) was a Chinese military commander. He belonged to the Fengtian clique, but eventually participated in the Wang Jingwei regime (Republic of China-Nanjing). He was born in Zaoqiang, Zhili (Hebei).

== Biography ==
In 1912 Rong Zhen entered the Department of the Artillery at the Baoding Military Academy. In November 1914 he graduated, then joined the unit of Fengtian clique's commander Li Jinglin (李景林).

In 1926 Rong Zhen was promoted to be commander of the 43rd Brigade of the 1st Division, the Northeast Army, commanded by Zhang Xueliang. In 1927, Rong was promoted to be commander of the 17th Army, and awarded the General of Renwei (仁威將軍). In 1928 Rong was appointed Chief of the Military Agency of the Headquarters, Northeast Border Defence Army (東北邊防軍司令部軍事廳廳長).

In 1931 Rong Zhen was appointed as the Chief of Staff of the Commander‐in‐Chief's Office of the Northeast Border Defence Army (東北邊防軍司令長官公署參謀長). When the Mukden Incident broke out, he supported Zhang Xueliang. In next August, Rong was transferred to the Executive Member of the Beiping Branch of the Military Committee, the National Government (國民政府軍事委員會北平委員會常務委員). In 1935 he was promoted to lieutenant general.

In 1943 Rong Zhen became a member of the Military Committee, the Wang Jingwei regime. Concurrently, he held the office of the Chief of the Committee for Subjugation Communists (剿共委員會), the North China Political Council In June 1944, he was transferred to Chief of the Northern Chinese Branch Court of the Special Court (特別法庭華北分庭庭長). In February 1945, he was appointed Governor of Hebei Province. In April he also became Chief Security Officer (綏靖主任) at Baoding.

After the Wang Jingwei regime had collapsed, Rong Zhen was arrested by Chiang Kai-shek's National Government. Because of the charge of the treason and surrender to enemy (namely Hanjian), he was sentenced to death on military tribunal for committing treason and surrendering to Japan, But he was not executed. After the foundation of PRC, he was treated as the friend of new government. In 1960, he died in Beijing.

== Alma mater ==
Baoding Military Academy

== Footnotes ==
- Xu Youchun (徐友春) (main ed.) (2007). Unabridged Biographical Dictionary of the Republic, Revised and Enlarged Version (民国人物大辞典 增订版). Hebei People's Press (Hebei Renmin Chubanshe; 河北人民出版社). ISBN 978-7-202-03014-1.
- Yu Zidao (余子道) (etc.) (2006). The Complete History of Wang's Fake Regime (汪伪政权全史). Shanghai People's Press (Shanghai Renmin Chubanshe; 上海人民出版社). ISBN 7-208-06486-5.
- Liu Shoulin (刘寿林) (etc.ed.) (1995). The Chronological Table of the Republic's Officer (民国职官年表). Zhonghua Book Company. ISBN 7-101-01320-1.
