= Lü Chuanzan =

Chinese politician

Lü Chuanzan (Chinese: 吕传赞; September 1932 – 16 April 2018) was a Chinese politician who served as Chairman of Hebei Provincial People's Congress, and Chairman of Hebei CPPCC. He was a delegate to the 6th National People's Congress (1983–1988), 7th National People's Congress (1988–1993) and 8th National People's Congress (1993–1998).

He was born in September 1932 in Muping District, Yantai, Shandong Province. He joined the Chinese Communist Party in June 1955, and graduated from the Political Economics Department of Renmin University of China.

Lü Chuanzan died on 16 April 2018 in Shijiazhuang, Hebei, aged 85.

Preceded by Guo Zhi	People's Congress Chairman of Hebei; 1993–1998	Succeeded by Cheng Weigao
