= Liu Bingyan =

Chinese politician

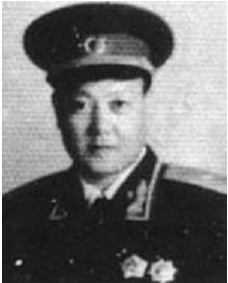

Liu Bingyan (Chinese: 刘秉彦) (1915–1998) was a Chinese politician. He was born in Hebei. He was governor of his home province. He was a delegate to the 1st National People's Congress, 5th National People's Congress and 6th National People's Congress.

Party political offices
| Preceded by Li Erzhong | Governor of Hebei; 1982–1983 | Succeeded by Zhang Shuguang |
| Preceded by Jiang Yizhen | Chairman of the Hebei People's Congress; 1983–1985 | Succeeded by Sun Guozhi |
