= Wang Xudong (politician) =

Chinese politician (born 1946)

- 王旭东

Chairperson of the State Electricity Regulatory Commission
- In office May 2008 – June 2011
- Premier: Wen Jiabao
- Preceded by: You Quan
- Succeeded by: Wu Xinxiong

Minister of Information Industry
- In office March 2003 – March 2008
- Premier: Wen Jiabao
- Preceded by: Wu Jichuan
- Succeeded by: Position revoked

Party Secretary of Hebei
- In office June 2000 – December 2002
- Deputy: Niu Maosheng (governor)
- Preceded by: Ye Liansong
- Succeeded by: Bai Keming

Personal details
- Born: 20 January 1946 (age 80) Yancheng County, Jiangsu, China
- Party: Chinese Communist Party
- Education: Tianjin Institute of Science and Technology

Chinese name
- Simplified Chinese: 王旭东
- Traditional Chinese: 王旭東
Transcriptions
Standard Mandarin
- Hanyu Pinyin: Wáng Xùdōng

Wang Xudong (Chinese: 王旭东; born January 1946) is a politician of the People's Republic of China. He formerly served as Minister of Information Industry, chairman of the State Electricity Regulatory Commission (SERC), and the Party Secretary of Hebei.

== Biography ==
Born in Yancheng, Jiangsu Province, Wang graduated from Wuxi Radio Industry School in September 1962, majoring in mechanics. He joined the Chinese Communist Party (CCP) in February 1972. He then started an internship at the 4th office of the 1418 research institute affiliated with the Commission of Science for National Defense. In October 1968, he was sent to work in the Dangcheng Commune in the Xijiao District of Tianjin. In October 1969, he returned to the 4th office of the 1418 research institute and became a group leader, vice secretary and later, secretary of the Chinese Communist Youth League committee in the institute. In November 1974, he was promoted to vice secretary of the CCP committee of the 1418 institute. In November 1976, he became vice secretary of the CCP committee of the 1418 research institute affiliated with the Ministry of Electronics and Industry, and also the director of its revolutionary commission. In October 1978, he became the president and vice Party chief of the 1418 institute.

From February 1980 to July 1982, Wang studied at the CCP Central Party School, and also took courses in system engineering of industrial science and technology management at the Tianjin training academy of science and technology. In April 1983, he was appointed as a standing committee member of the CCP Tianjin committee and leader of the Tianjin department of science and technology. In September 1983, he became a standing committee member and the director of the organization department of the CCP Tianjin committee. In September 1991, he was elevated to vice secretary of the CCP Tianjin committee and the head of the organization department. In August 1993, he was promoted to vice director of the organization department of the Central Committee of the Chinese Communist Party. He became the secretary of the CCP Hebei committee in June 2000. In November 2002, he was appointed vice minister and Party chief of the Ministry of Industry and Information. In March 2003, he became the Minister of Industry and Information, as well as the Ministry's Party chief. In June 2003, he was additionally appointed as the director and party chief of the Information Office of the State Council. In March 2008 when the Ministry of Industry and Information was formed, he was appointed as vice minister. In May 2008, he became the chairman of the State Electricity Regulatory Commission (SERC) of the PRC.

He was an alternate member of the 15th Central Committee of the Chinese Communist Party, and a full member of the 16th and 17th Central Committees.

Party political offices
Preceded by Ye Liansong	Party Secretary of Hebei; 2000–2002	Succeeded by Bai Keming
Government offices
Preceded by Wu Jichuan	Minister of Information Industry; 2003–2008	Succeeded by Position revoked
Preceded by You Quan	Chairperson of the State Electricity Regulatory Commission; 2008–2011	Succeeded by Wu Xinxiong
