= Yu Guangzhou =

Chinese politician

- 于广洲
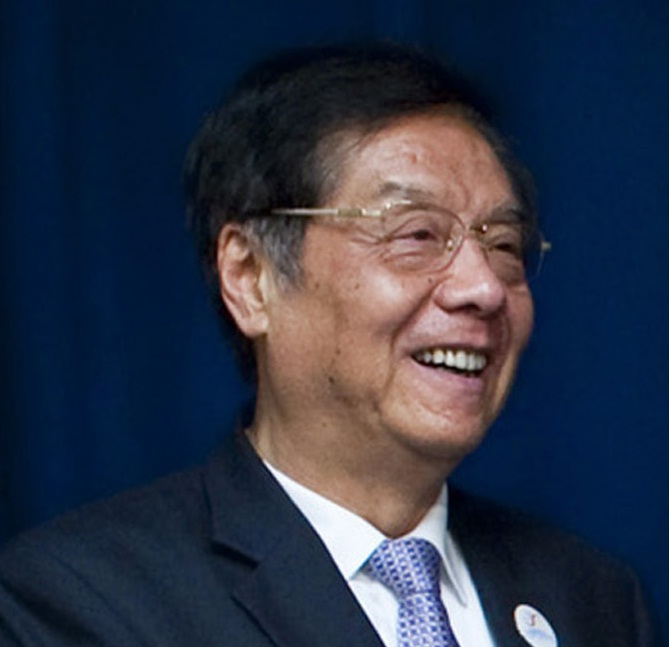

Minister of the General Administration of Customs
- In office April 2011 – March 2018
- Preceded by: Sheng Guangzu
- Succeeded by: Ni Yuefeng

Personal details
- Born: January 1953 (age 73) Funing, Jiangsu, China
- Party: Chinese Communist Party
- Education: Central Party School

Yu Guangzhou (Chinese: 于广洲; born January 1953) is a retired politician of the People's Republic of China.

== Career ==
Yu served as Minister of the General Administration of Customs from April 2011 to March 2018. Prior to that, he served as Mayor of Wuxi (1993–1997) and Xuzhou (1997–2000) in Jiangsu province, Vice Governor of Jiangsu (2000–2001), Vice Minister of Commerce (2003–2008), and Chinese Communist Party Deputy Committee Secretary of Fujian province (2009–2011).

Yu was a member of the 18th Central Committee of the Chinese Communist Party.
