= Li Erzhong =

Chinese politician

Li Erzhong (Chinese: 李尔重) (1914–2010) was a Chinese politician. He was born in Hebei Province. He was governor of his home province (1980–1982). He was a delegate to the 5th National People's Congress.

| Preceded by Liu Zihou | Governor of Hebei; 1980–1982 | Succeeded by Liu Bingyan |
