= Yu Jianhua =

Chinese politician (1961–2024)

- 俞建华
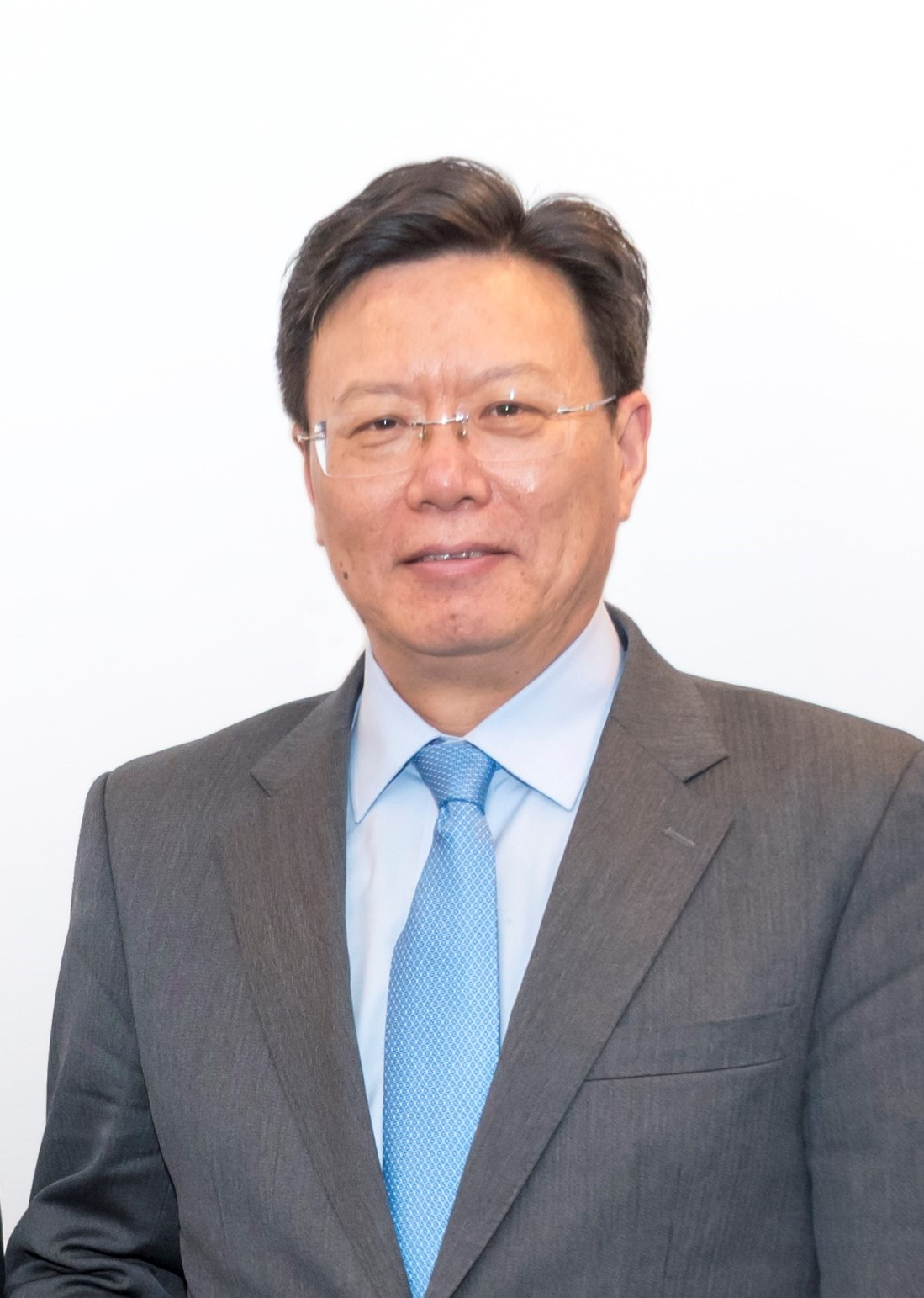
- Yu in 2018

Head of the General Administration of Customs
- In office April 2022 – 10 December 2024
- Preceded by: Ni Yuefeng
- Succeeded by: Sun Meijun

Permanent Representative of China to the United Nations Office at Geneva and Other International Organizations in Switzerland
- In office 2017–2019
- Preceded by: Ma Zhaoxu
- Succeeded by: Chen Xu

Personal details
- Born: December 1961 Yancheng County, Jiangsu, China
- Died: 10 December 2024 (aged 62–63) Beijing, China
- Party: Chinese Communist Party
- Education: Yancheng Teachers University; China Foreign Affairs University

Chinese name
- Simplified Chinese: 俞建华
- Traditional Chinese: 俞建華
Transcriptions
Standard Mandarin
- Hanyu Pinyin: Yú Jiànhuá

Yu Jianhua (Chinese: 俞建华; December 1961 – 10 December 2024) was a Chinese politician and diplomat who was the head of the General Administration of Customs from 2022 until his death in 2024.

== Biography ==
Yu was born in Yancheng County (now Yancheng), Jiangsu in December 1961. He studied at Wuyou High School and in 1978, he was accepted to Yancheng Teachers University, majoring in the Department of Foreign Languages. After graduation, he taught at the university. In 1988, he became a graduate student at the China Foreign Affairs University. He joined the Chinese Communist Party in June 1991.

After graduation, he was assigned to the Ministry of Economy and Trade (later reshuffled as Ministry of Commerce), where he was promoted to assistant minister in January 2011. In October 2013, he was appointed permanent representative of China to the World Trade Organization, a position he held until February 2017, when he was promoted to vice minister of Commerce and deputy representative for international trade negotiations. In December 2017, he was made ambassador of the permanent mission of China to the United Nations Office at Geneva and Other International Organizations in Switzerland, but only held the position for a year and a half. In April 2019, he was recalled to be vice minister of Commerce and deputy representative for international trade negotiations. In January 2021, he rose to become representative for international trade negotiations, although he remained a vice minister of Commerce.

In April 2022, he took office as head of the General Administration of Customs, succeeding Ni Yuefeng.

Yu died after a brief illness on 10 December 2024. However, Luo Changping and other dissidents claim that Yu committed suicide after a corruption probe by the Central Commission for Discipline Inspection, citing abrupt censorship of an article mentioning Yu on Jilin provincial state media.

Diplomatic posts
Preceded by Yi Xiaozhun	Permanent Representative of China to the World Trade Organization; 2013–2017	Succeeded by Zhang Xiangchen
Government offices
Preceded by Ni Yuefeng	Head of the General Administration of Customs; 2022–2024	Succeeded by Sun Meijun
