= Xing Chongzhi =

Twentieth century Chinese politician

Xing Chongzhi (Chinese: 邢崇智) (1927–2000) was a Chinese politician. He was born in She County, Hebei. He was Chinese Communist Party Committee Secretary of Hebei Province (1986–1993).

| Preceded by Gao Yang | Communist Party Chief of Hebei; 1986–1993 | Succeeded by Cheng Weigao |
