= Guo Zhi =

Chinese politician (1925–2023)

- 郭志

Chairman of Hebei Provincial People's Congress
- In office 1988–1993
- Preceded by: Sun Guozhi
- Succeeded by: Lü Chuanzan

Personal details
- Born: 1925 Gaocheng County, Zhili, China
- Died: March 11, 2023 (aged 98) Shijiazhuang, Hebei, China
- Party: Chinese Communist Party

Military service
- Allegiance: People's Republic of China
- Branch/service: Eighth Route Army; People's Liberation Army Ground Force
- Years of service: 1941–1947
- Battles/wars: Second Sino-Japanese War

Guo Zhi (Chinese: 郭志; pinyin: Guō Zhì; 1925 – 11 March 2023) was a Chinese politician.

== Biography ==
He was born in Gaocheng County, Hebei (now Gaocheng District, Shijiazhuang). He joined the Chinese Communist Party (CCP) in 1941.

He was People's Congress Chairman of his home province. He was a delegate to the 5th National People's Congress (1978–1983), 6th National People's Congress (1983–1988), 7th National People's Congress (1988–1993) and 8th National People's Congress (1993–1998).

Gun died on 11 March 2023, at the age of 98.

Assembly seats
Preceded by Sun Guozhi	Chairman of Hebei Provincial People's Congress; 1988–1993	Succeeded by Lü Chuanzan
