= Ye Liansong =

Chinese politician

- 叶连松

Party Secretary of Hebei
- In office September 1998 – March 2000
- Preceded by: Cheng Weigao
- Succeeded by: Wang Xudong

Governor of Hebei
- In office 21 May 1993 – 6 November 1998
- Preceded by: Cheng Weigao
- Succeeded by: Niu Maosheng

Personal details
- Born: March 1935 (age 91) Laiyang, Shandong, China
- Party: Chinese Communist Party
- Education: Dalian Institute of Technology; Shanghai Jiao Tong University

Ye Liansong (Chinese: 叶连松; born March 1935) is a Chinese politician who served as Communist Party Secretary (1998–2000) and Governor (1993–1998) of Hebei Province. Prior to his political career he worked for two decades as an engineering professor at his alma mater Shanghai Jiao Tong University, and then as chief engineer of Shijiazhuang Diesel Engine Factory.

== Biography ==
Ye was born in Laiyang, Shandong Province in March 1935. He attended Dalian Institute of Technology (now Dalian University of Technology) from 1954 to 1955, before transferring to Shanghai Jiao Tong University. After graduating in August 1960 with a degree in marine engineering, he stayed at the university as a faculty member until 1973. He joined the Chinese Communist Party in 1960.

In March 1973, he was transferred to Shijiazhuang Diesel Engine Factory to serve as its chief engineer and deputy head. In October 1980, he was appointed vice mayor of Shijiazhuang, the capital of Hebei Province. During an interview, Ye said he had never thought of becoming a politician, and had no idea that he was to become vice mayor until Jia Ran, party chief of Shijiazhuang, told him the government's decision.

He was promoted to vice governor of Hebei in June 1985, and became a member of the Provincial Party Standing Committee. He became Governor of Hebei in May 1993, and was promoted to Communist Party Secretary, the top post in the province, in September 1998. He served as party chief until March 2000, when he became a standing committee member of the Chinese People's Political Consultative Conference (CPPCC). Starting in 2003, he served as Vice-Chairman of the Economy Committee of the CPPCC.

Ye was an alternate member to the 13th Central Committee of the Chinese Communist Party (1987–1992) and a full member of the 14th (1992–1997) and 15th (1997–2002) Central Committees. He was a delegate to the 8th (1993–1998) and 9th National People's Congress (1998–2003).

Party political offices
Preceded by Cheng Weigao	Party Secretary of Hebei; 1998–2000	Succeeded by Wang Xudong
Political offices
Preceded by Cheng Weigao	Governor of Hebei; 1993–1998	Succeeded by Niu Maosheng
