= Cheng Weigao =

Chinese politician (1933–2010)

- 程维高

Party Secretary of Hebei
- In office January 27, 1993 – October 8, 1998
- Deputy: Ye Liansong (Governor)
- Preceded by: Xing Chongzhi
- Succeeded by: Ye Liansong

Personal details
- Born: September 5, 1933 Suzhou, Jiangsu, China
- Died: December 28, 2010 (aged 77) Changzhou, Jiangsu, China
- Party: Chinese Communist Party (1950–2003; expelled)
- Children: 3, incl. Cheng Muyang

Cheng Weigao (Chinese: 程维高; September 1933 – December 28, 2010) was a Chinese politician, best known for his term as the Party Secretary of Hebei between 1993 and 1998. Cheng was expelled from the Chinese Communist Party in 2003 after several of his associates and family members were implicated in corruption cases. He was not criminally charged but was administratively demoted from provincial to sub-provincial rank and retired at that level. When he died in 2010, the CCP's official obituary gave him a positive evaluation.

== Biography ==
Cheng was born in Suzhou, Jiangsu Province. As a teenager, he followed his parents to neighboring Changzhou. He began his political career at 16 in 1949, when he entered the Communist Youth League, and joined the Chinese Communist Party about a year later.

After serving as a junior cadre for a decade, Cheng became secretary to the deputy party chief of Changzhou in 1959. In 1965, he was appointed head of a local tractor factory, where he worked for seven years and gained recognition for his managerial skills. Under his direction, the factory developed the Dongfeng-12 tractor model, adapted from Japanese designs, which became widely used in rural China. In 1972, he was transferred to lead the Shanghuang Mine.

In 1977, after twelve years working outside government institutions, Cheng was appointed deputy director of the Changzhou Municipal Planning Commission and later director of the Construction Commission. Confronted with severe housing shortages and urban disorganization in the aftermath of the Cultural Revolution, he launched a large-scale urban planning initiative that relocated residents from the congested city center to newly built residential communities. In January 1980, construction began on the city's first such neighborhood, Huayuan Xincun. Later that year, Cheng was appointed deputy mayor of Changzhou, responsible for industry and urban construction. His "Changzhou housing model" attracted national attention, and in 1983, he was promoted to Communist Party Secretary of Changzhou.

Cheng served as Party Secretary of Nanjing from February 1984 to July 1987, concurrently sitting on the Jiangsu Provincial Party Standing Committee. From 1988 to 1990, he served as Deputy Party Secretary and Governor of Henan Province. Between July 1990 and January 1993, he was Deputy Party Secretary of Hebei Province, and from April 1991 to May 1993 concurrently served as Governor. In January 1993, he was appointed Party Secretary of Hebei, a post he held until late 1998, the same year when he came under investigation by the Central Commission for Discipline Inspection (CCDI).

In 2000, Li Zhen, then director of the Hebei Provincial State Taxation Bureau and Cheng's first secretary in Hebei, was placed under shuanggui for investigation. Several of Cheng's protégés, including Wu Qingwu, former Deputy Director of the Hebei Government General Office and Cheng's second secretary in Hebei, and Wang Fuyou, former Deputy Secretary-General of the Hebei Government, were subsequently imprisoned. Cheng instructed his son, Cheng Muyang, also known as Michael Ching, to leave China shortly before the Hebei provincial procuratorate issued a warrant for Ching's arrest. Ching, who has become a real estate developer in Canada, never returned to China.

In January 2003, Cheng presided over his final session as chairman of the Tenth Hebei People's Congress. The following day, despite the CCDI's order that he remain in Hebei during the investigation, Cheng left Shijiazhuang and returned to his hometown of Changzhou, where he lived for the remainder of his life in a mansion named Yu Yuan (愚园), literally "Fool's Garden," a name he chose as an act of self-deprecation.

In August 2003, the CCDI announced that Cheng had been expelled from the Chinese Communist Party. The investigation concluded that during his tenure as Hebei's leader, Cheng had interfered in administrative affairs, sought profits for others and for his son, caused significant economic losses to the state, allowed his family members to engage in misconduct and illegal business activities, retaliated against a whistleblower, and accepted valuable gifts. The CCDI also found that Cheng bore major responsibility for the criminal activities of his two secretaries, Li Zhen and Wu Qingwu. He was not criminally charged but was demoted from full provincial (ministerial) rank to sub-provincial (vice-ministerial) level. Cheng retired unscathed at that level following the investigation, a result believed to have stemmed from the intervention of Jiang Zemin, an ally and longtime friend who also hailed from Jiangsu.

On January 7, 2004, the Qiaodong District People's Court of Zhangjiakou sentenced Cheng's eldest daughter, Cheng Youlan, who had been detained since February 2003 over tax evasion, to three years in prison, suspended for five years, and imposed a fine of 7.0899 million yuan.

Cheng died in Changzhou on December 28, 2010, at the age of 78. His funeral was held two days later. Cheng's son, Ching, was unable to return to China due to the outstanding arrest warrant. Ching's wife and children attended the funeral and livestreamed it via laptop so that Ching could watch the ceremony from abroad. The CCP Organization Department issued Cheng's official obituary, stating that during his tenure in Hebei, "he continued to emancipate his thinking, acted with a strong sense of reform and opening-up, advanced proactively, and worked vigorously to implement policies, dedicating great effort to the province's reform, opening, and economic and social development."

In 2015, the Chinese government issued a Red Notice for Cheng's son, Ching, through Interpol. In 2018, Interpol removed Ching's name from the list, stating that the information provided by China did not comply with its policies. Beginning in 2015, a series of rulings by the Federal Court of Canada found in favor of Ching, who had sought Canadian citizenship and protection from deportation, determining that the Chinese authorities' corruption allegations—one of the main reasons for Cheng's expulsion from the Party on grounds of nepotism—were based on evidence obtained through torture. Ching was granted Canadian citizenship in 2020, after nearly two decades of legal proceedings.

In his unpublished memoir Fourteen Years in Hebei, Cheng wrote:

In my life, it was only in the last five years [of my Hebei term] that I truly came to understand the importance of democracy and the rule of law. This was not because I had served for five years as chairman of the provincial people's congress, but because I experienced it personally during the five years of investigation against me. In our country, both democracy and the rule of law still have a long way to go. It is not that we lack formal institutions, but that we lack the various safeguards necessary to uphold them. The impact of vested interests and the spread of corruption have made these safeguards extremely fragile. Without strong and unshakable guarantees, such systems exist in name only. The rule of law cannot protect the legitimate rights and interests of the people, and democracy becomes an empty talk—a mere illusion. Without adequate democracy and the rule of law, social conflicts will intensify, and the enthusiasm of the people cannot be fully mobilized. Without them, socialist modernization is nothing but an empty slogan.

Political offices
| Preceded by He Zhukang | Governor of Henan; 1988–1990 | Succeeded by Li Changchun |
| Preceded by Yue Qifeng | Governor of Hebei; 1990–1993 | Succeeded by Ye Liansong |
Party political offices
| Preceded by Xing Chongzhi | Party Secretary of Hebei; 1993–1998 | Succeeded by Ye Liansong |
