= General Administration of Customs =

Chinese ministry-level administrative agency

General Administration of Customs of the People's Republic of China
- 中华人民共和国海关总署; Zhōnghuá Rénmín Gònghéguó Hǎiguān Zǒng Shǔ
- Emblem of the China Customs

- Flag of the China Customs

Agency overview
- Formed: October 25, 1949; 77 years ago
- Type: National
- Jurisdiction: Mainland China
- Headquarters: Beijing
- Motto: 守国门，促发展，当好让党放心，让人民满意的国门卫士 (lit. Guard the national gate, promote the development, to be a national gatekeeper reassuring presence to the party, and satisfying the people)
- Agency executive: Sun Meijun, Minister
- Parent agency: State Council
- Website: www.customs.gov.cn

The General Administration of Customs of the People's Republic of China (GACC), also known as the China Customs, is a ministry-level administrative agency under the State Council of the People's Republic of China. It is responsible for the collection of value added tax, customs duties, excise duties, and other indirect taxes such as air passenger duty, climate change levy, insurance premium tax, landfill tax and aggregates levy. It is also responsible for managing the import and export of goods and services into mainland China. The agency is headed by the Minister Sun Meijun since 10 February 2025.

== Customs emblem ==
The emblem was designed by a customs officer named Chen Tiebao (陈铁保) in 1951. The emblem consists of a golden key and the Caduceus of Hermes, crossing with each other. It was officially adopted on 1 October 1953. The emblem was not used from 1966 to 1985, as it was considered "too capitalist".

== List of ministers ==
No.	Name	Native name	Took office	Left office	Ref.
1	Kong Yuan	孔原	19 October 1949	14 January 1953	
2	Wang Runsheng	王润生	May 1980	5 November 1984	
3	Dai Jie	戴杰	5 November 1984	29 January 1993	
4	Qian Guanlin	钱冠林	29 January 1993	26 April 2001	
5	Mou Xinsheng	牟新生	26 April 2001	13 March 2008	
6	Sheng Guangzu	盛光祖	13 March 2008	25 February 2011	
7	Yu Guangzhou	于广洲	5 April 2011	22 March 2018	
8	Ni Yuefeng	倪岳峰	22 March 2018	18 May 2022	
9	Yu Jianhua	俞建华	18 May 2022	10 December 2024	
10	Sun Meijun	孙梅君	10 February 2025	Current	

== See also ==
- Chinese Maritime Customs Service, for the agency's pre-1949 predecessor
- China Immigration Inspection
- Customs and Excise Department (Hong Kong)
- Macau Customs Service under the Secretariat for Security (Macau)
