= Ni Yuefeng =

Chinese politician (born 1964)

- 倪岳峰
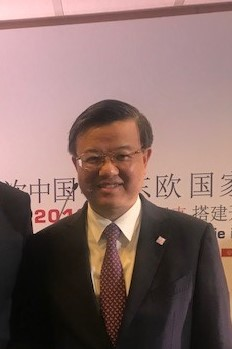

Party Secretary of Hebei
- In office 22 April 2022 – 31 July 2026
- Deputy: Wang Zhengpu (governor)
- Preceded by: Wang Dongfeng
- Succeeded by: Luo Wen

Head of the General Administration of Customs
- In office March 2018 – April 2022
- Preceded by: Yu Guangzhou
- Succeeded by: Yu Jianhua

Party Secretary of Fuzhou
- In office August 2016 – May 2017
- Preceded by: Yang Yue
- Succeeded by: Wang Ning

Personal details
- Born: September 1964 (age 62) Yuexi County, Anhui, China
- Party: Chinese Communist Party
- Education: Hefei University of Technology; Tsinghua University

Ni Yuefeng (Chinese: 倪岳峰; pinyin: Ní Yuèfēng; born September 1964) is a Chinese politician, who served as the party secretary of Hebei from 2022 to 2026. He also served as the head and party branch secretary of the General Administration of Customs and before that, party secretary of Fuzhou and deputy party secretary of Fujian.

He is a representative of the 19th National Congress of the Chinese Communist Party and a member of the 19th Central Committee of the Chinese Communist Party. He was an alternate of the 18th Central Committee of the Chinese Communist Party. He was a member of the Standing Committee of the 10th and 11th National People's Congress.

== Biography ==
=== Shandong ===
Ni was born in Yuexi County, Anhui, in September 1964. In 1980, he entered Hefei University of Technology, majoring in industrial automation. After graduation, he taught at the university. He went on to receive his doctor's degree in systems engineering in 1990 at Tsinghua University.

Ni joined the Chinese Communist Party (CCP) in March 1985, and got involved in politics in July 1993, when he was assigned to the Qingdao Municipal People's Government in east China's Shandong province. He was transferred to the State Oceanic Administration in July 1998 and two years later rose to become its deputy head. In March 2003, he joined the National People's Congress Environment and Resources Protection Committee, where he was prompted to vice chairperson in February 2008.

=== Fujian ===
In February 2011, he was transferred to south China's Fujian province and appointed vice governor. He was appointed secretary of Fujian Commission for Discipline Inspection in June 2013 and was admitted to member of the standing committee of the CCP Fujian Provincial Committee, the province's top authority. He concurrently served as party secretary of the capital city Fuzhou since August 2016.

In May 2017, he was promoted to be party branch secretary of the General Administration of Customs, concurrently holding the head position since March 2018.

=== Hebei ===
In April 2022, he was despatched to north China's Hebei province and appointed party secretary of Hebei, the top political position in the province. In the aftermath of the 2023 China floods caused by Typhoon Doksuri, Ni commented that his province, and specifically the city of Zhuozhou, can "serve as a moat for the capital" using flood storage and detention areas.

On July 31, 2026, the Central Committee of the Chinese Communist Party decided that Ni Yuefeng would no longer serve as Secretary, Standing Committee Member, or Member of the Hebei Provincial Committee of the Chinese Communist Party, and that he would be reassigned to another position. On August 28, he was appointed Vice Chairperson of the Social Development Affairs Committee of the 14th National People's Congress.

Party political offices
| Preceded by Zhang Changping | Secretary of Fujian Commission for Discipline Inspection; 2013–2016 | Succeeded by Liu Xuexin |
| Preceded by Yang Yue | Party Secretary of Fuzhou; 2016–2017 | Succeeded by Wang Ning |
| Preceded by Yu Weiguo | Deputy Party Secretary of Fujian; 2016–2017 | Succeeded by Wang Ning |
| Preceded by Wang Dongfeng | Party Secretary of Hebei; 2022–2026 | Succeeded by Luo Wen |
Government offices
| Preceded by Yu Guangzhou | Head of the General Administration of Customs; 2018–2022 | Succeeded by Yu Jianhua |
