= Hebei Normal University =

University in China

Coordinates: 37°35′43″N 114°18′19″E

- 河北师范大学
- Motto: Concerns about the whole world, while striving for true knowledge.
- Type: Public
- Established: 1902
- President: Liu Jingze (刘敬泽)
- Academic staff: 3,016
- Undergraduates: 30,199 (including specialist students)
- Postgraduates: 4,952
- Location: Shijiazhuang, Hebei, China
- Website: www.hebtu.edu.cn

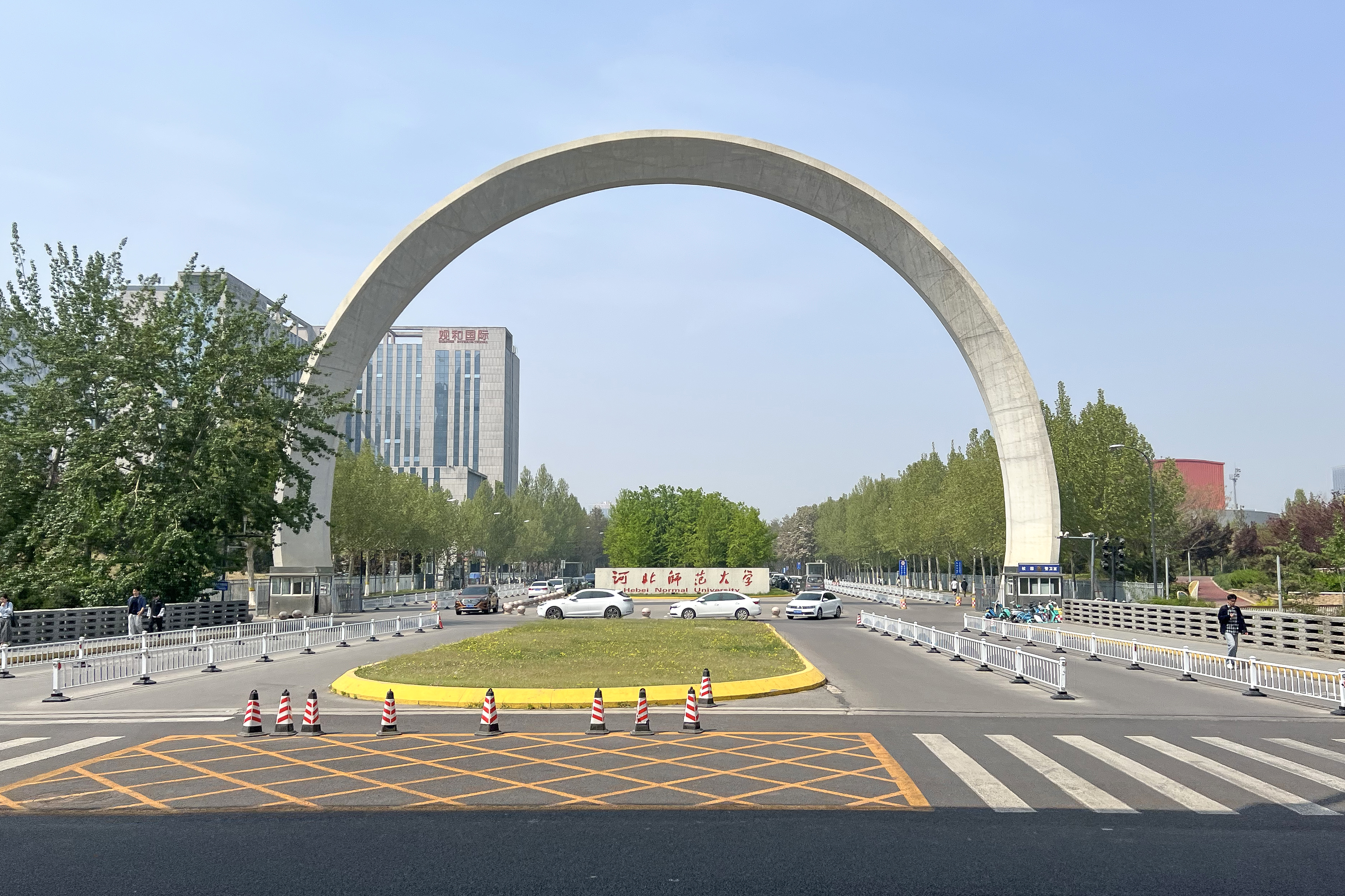
Yuhua campus

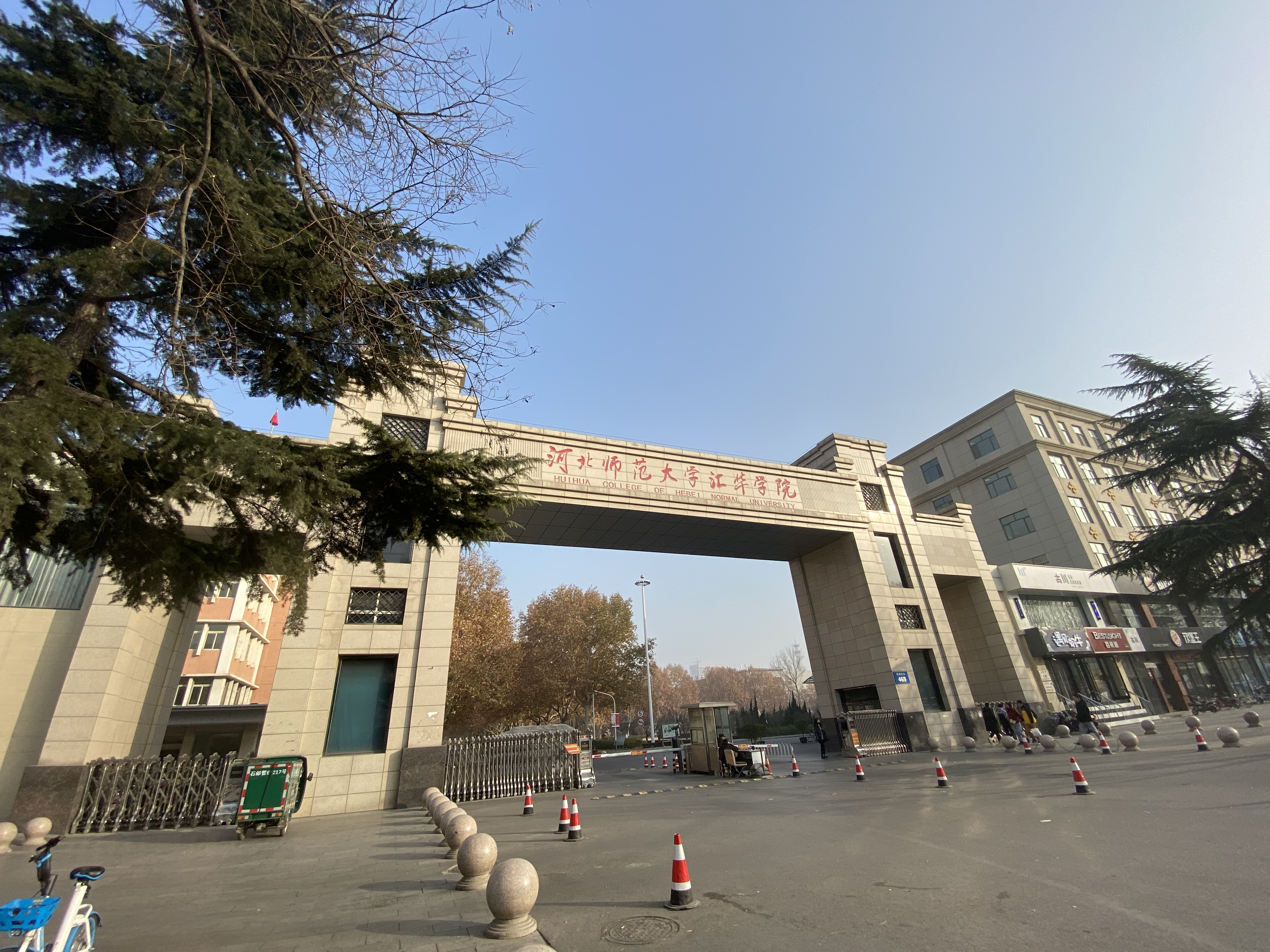

Hebei Normal University (Chinese: 河北师范大学) is a public research university in Shijiazhuang, Hebei province, China. It is a provincial key university with more than 100 years of history. It is supported by both the Hebei Province and Education Department of China.

== History ==
The university originated from Shuntian School (Shuntian-fu xuetang 顺天府学堂) established in Beijing in 1902 and Beiyang Women Normal School (Beiyang nushiyuan xuetang 北洋女师范学堂) established in Tianjin in 1906.

Approved by Hebei provincial government, the former Hebei Teachers University and Hebei Teachers College, the Hebei Education Institute established in 1952 and Hebei Vocational and Technological College merged into one in June 1996 and was named Hebei Normal University. Hebei Normal University is an early-established large-scale university in China.

Graduates include Deng Yingchao, Liu Qingyang, Guo Longzhen, Yang Xiufeng, Kang Shien, Liang Suming, Zhang Shenfu and Tang Yongtong. Among the graduates are academicians such as Yan Luguang and Hao Bolin and famous coaches and athletes who won championship in international games such as Xu Shaofa and Cai Zhenhua. Since 1949, Hebei Normal University has educated more than 200,000 students.

== Students and staff ==
Hebei Normal University covers 1829 mu (121 hectares). The university library has a collection of 3,300,000 volumes of books. The university embraces a faculty and staff of 2,852 with a teaching faculty of 1,480 among whom there are 359 professors, 974 associate professors, one academician of China Academy of Sciences, 106 provincial model experts, 138 Ph.D. supervisors and 871 postgraduate tutors. Total number of on-campus undergraduate students is 57,658, including 33,404 students majored in two- or four-year programs, 3,866 graduate students and 20,388 further education students.

== Colleges and departments ==
At present, Hebei Normal University has 21 colleges and one independent college (Huihua College). There are 81 four-year undergraduate programs, 91 master's degree programs and 24 doctoral degree programs. In addition, there are four post-doctoral-research stations, two State Demo Centers of Experimental Teaching, and four Province Demo Centers of Experimental Teaching.

- College of Life Science
- College of Mathematics and Information Sciences
- College of Physics and Information Engineering
- College of Law and Politics
- College of Education
- College of Literature
- College of History and Culture
- College of Foreign Languages
- College of Music
- College of Fine Arts and Design
- College of Journalism and Communication
- College of Business
- College of Public Administration
- College of Resources and Environment
- College of Physical Education
- College of Chemistry and Material Sciences
- College of Information Technology
- College of Vocational and Technology
- College of Tourism
- College of Software
- Huihua College

The disciplines and specialties in Hebei Normal University have covered nine fields: philosophy, economics, laws, literature, history, education, management, sciences, and engineering. The university now has one state first-rank discipline, four provincial-rank excellent disciplines, and 15 provincial key laboratories.

There are nine units directly under the governing of the university: CCP Training School, Graduate School, College of Further Education and Teacher Training; College of International Culture Exchange; Training Centre for Higher Education Teachers; Further Education Center; Office for New Campus Construction; Institute for Education Development; and Office of Development.

The other affiliated units of the university include Computer and Network Center; Analysis and Test Center; Editor Office of University Journal; University Logistic Service Group; Publishing House of Chinese Philology Weekly; Thoughts and Wizdom Journal; University Hospital; Affiliated Middle School; Affiliated Primary School; Affiliated Experimental Middle and Primary School; Affiliated Minority College (Tibet); Department of Computor Teaching; Hebei Provincial Center for Modern Higher Education Technology; Hebei Vocational Education Research Institute; Hebei Research Institute of Pedagogy; Discipline Education Research Institute and Ancient Books Selecting and Sorting-out Research Institute.

== Research ==
Since the merging of four universities in 1996, the university got two national awards of teaching achievements, 41 provincial awards of teaching achievements and has undertaken eight state projects of teaching innovation as well as 11 provincial level projects concerning the same areas. From 1997 to 2011, the university undertook 718 research programs above department level, among them 231 programs are national (37 natural science research programs and 18 social science research programs) and 199 research programs at the provincial (123 natural science research programs and 76 social science research programs). There are a group of programs having nationwide influence such as national 937 Project, the project of the State Natural Scientific Funds and the Projects of Excellent Youth Scientific Funds. Some of the scientific research achievements take the lead in the nation or in the province. Up to now, 483 academic books and 6,542 essays have been published publicly. According to the statistics of the essays from universities and college provided by China Science and Technology Information Office, in the years of 1999, 2000 and 2001 the scientific essays collected in SCI (SCIE) rank as No. 49, No. 44 and No. 62.

Since 2002, the annually funds for research has rapidly increased from ¥6 million to ¥42.29 million in 2008. There are 143 newly-undertaken state research projects, including 112 natural science programs and 31 social science programs. The university has undertaken some state key research programs with significance, for example, programs of National "973" Plan, State "863" Plan. Plans, key programs and special programs, for example, key programs on transferring agricultural research into technology and transgenic industry development program sponsored by National Science Foundation, Key Program of Pre-study Plans of State Science and Technology Ministry, Key programs of National Social Science Foundation and The state key project of Qing-dynasty History and so on. Some of the achievements produced from these programs, published in Science, The Plant Cell, Inventions, Mathematical, Advances in Mathematics, and The Astrophysical Journal, are first-level at home and abroad.

== International connections ==
Hebei Normal University has established relationship with more than 30 universities all over the world. The university, approved by the State Education Committee, can enroll international students including students from Hong Kong, Macau and Taiwan.

== University rankings ==
Hebei Normal University (HNU) has many good ranking results, for example, the Mathematics and Applied Mathematics Subject, and Biological Science were ranked 1st in Hebei Province. The Law study was ranked in top 100 universities in China. HNU ranked third in 2015 Top 4 Chinese Language and Literature Universities in Hebei. The Subject of Mathematics ranked 36th in China in 2012 by Educational Department Degree Center of China.
