= Wang Zhengpu =

Chinese politician

- 王正谱

Governor of Hebei
- In office 21 October 2021 – 25 October 2026
- Party Secretary: Wang Dongfeng; Ni Yuefeng; Luo Wen
- Preceded by: Xu Qin
- Succeeded by: Zhao Chenxin (acting)

Director of National Administration for Rural Revitalization
- In office 25 February 2021 – 20 October 2021
- Preceded by: New title
- Succeeded by: Liu Huanxin

Personal details
- Born: August 1963 (age 63) Yantai, Shandong, China
- Party: Chinese Communist Party
- Education: China Agricultural University

Chinese name
- Simplified Chinese: 王正谱
- Traditional Chinese: 王正譜
Transcriptions
Standard Mandarin
- Hanyu Pinyin: Wáng Zhèngpǔ

Wang Zhengpu (Chinese: 王正谱; born August 1963) is a Chinese politician who previously served as governor of Hebei, in office since 21 October 2021. Previously he served as director of the National Administration for Rural Revitalization.

He was a delegate to the 12th National People's Congress and is a representative of the 19th National Congress of the Chinese Communist Party.

== Biography ==
Wang was born in Yantai, Shandong, in August 1963. In 1983, he enrolled in Beijing Agricultural University (now China Agricultural University), majoring in agricultural economic management, where he graduated in 1987.

Wang joined the Chinese Communist Party (CCP) in April 1987, and was despatched to the Ministry of Agriculture in July 1987, where he worked his way from an ordinary official to the position of Director of Finance Division over a period of 21 years.

In October 2010, he was transferred to northeast China's Liaoning province and appointed acting mayor and deputy party secretary of Liaoyang, and then party secretary, the top political position in the city, beginning in September 2014. In October 2015, he became deputy head of the Organization Department of the CCP Liaoning Provincial Committee, rising to head the next year. He became a member of the Standing Committee of the CCP Liaoning Provincial Committee in October 2016 before being assigned to the similar position in southwest China's Sichuan province in August 2018.

On 25 February 2021, he took office as director of the newly founded National Administration for Rural Revitalization, but having held the position for only half a year.

On 19 October 2021, he was promoted to deputy party secretary of Hebei, replacing Xu Qin, who was appointed party secretary of Heilongjiang. On October 21, he was made acting governor of Hebei.

He was awarded the Silver Olympic Order after the 2022 Winter Olympics.

In October 2026, he stepped down as deputy secretary of the Hebei Party Provincial Committee and secretary of the Party Group of the Hebei Provincial People's Government upon reaching the age limit. On 25 October 2026, he resigned from his position as governor of Hebei. On 6 November 2026, he was appointed as the vice chairman of the National People's Congress Agriculture and Rural Affairs Committee at the 25th meeting of the Standing Committee of the 14th National People's Congress.

Government offices
Preceded by Tang Zhiguo	Mayor of Liaoyang; 2010–2014	Succeeded by Pei Weidong
New title	Director of National Administration for Rural Revitalization; 2021	Succeeded by Liu Huanxin
Preceded by Xu Qin	Governor of Hebei; 2021–2026	Succeeded by Zhao Chenxin
Party political offices
Preceded by Tang Zhiguo	Communist Party Secretary of Liaoyang; 2014–2015	Succeeded by Wang Fengbo
Preceded by Xin Guizi	Head of the Organization Department of the CCP Liaoning Provincial Committee; 2016–2018	Succeeded by Lu Zhiyuan
Preceded by Huang Jianfa	Head of the Organization Department of the CCP Sichuan Provincial Committee; 2018–2021	Succeeded by Yu Lijun
