= Hebei Provincial Committee of the Chinese Communist Party =

Hebei Provincial Committee of the Chinese Communist Party 中国共产党河北省委员会

Overview
- Type: Highest decision-making organ when Hebei Provincial Congress is not in session.
- Elected by: Hebei Provincial Congress
- Length of term: Five years
- Term limits: None
- First convocation: 1949
- Secretary: Luo Wen
- Deputy Secretary: Zhao Chenxin (Acting governor); Chang Bin
- Executive organ: Standing Committee
- Inspection organ: Commission for Discipline Inspection

Hebei Provincial Committee of the Chinese Communist Party
- Simplified Chinese: 中国共产党河北省委员会
- Traditional Chinese: 中國共產黨河北省委員會
Transcriptions
Standard Mandarin
- Hanyu Pinyin: Zhōngguó Gòngchǎndǎng Héběishěng Wěiyuánhuì

Abbreviation
- Chinese: 中共河北省委
- Literal meaning: CCP Hebei Provincial Committee
Transcriptions
Standard Mandarin
- Hanyu Pinyin: Zhōnggòng Héběishěng Wěi

The Hebei Provincial Committee of the Chinese Communist Party is the provincial committee of the Chinese Communist Party (CCP) in Hebei. The committee secretary is the highest ranking post in the province. The current secretary is Luo Wen.

== Organization ==
The organization of the Hebei Provincial Committee includes:

- General Office

=== Functional Departments ===
- Organization Department
- Publicity Department
- United Front Work Department
- Political and Legal Affairs Commission

=== Offices ===
- Policy Research Office
- Office of the National Security Commission
- Office of the Cyberspace Affairs Commission
- Office of the Institutional Organization Commission
- Office of the Military-civilian Fusion Development Committee
- Taiwan Work Office
- Letters and Calls Bureau
- Bureau of Veteran Cadres

=== Dispatched institutions ===
- Working Committee of the Organs Directly Affiliated to the Hebei Provincial Committee

=== Organizations directly under the Committee ===
- Hebei Party School
- Hebei Institute of Socialism
- Hebei Daily
- Party History Research Office
- Hebei Provincial Archives

== Leadership ==
=== Party Committees ===
9th Provincial Party Committee (November 2016 – November 2021)

- Secretary: Zhao Kezhi (until 28 October 2017), Wang Dongfeng (from 28 October 2017)
- Deputy Secretaries: Zhang Qingwei (until April 2017), Li Ganjie (until May 2017), Xu Qin (April 2017–October 2021), Zhao Yide (March 2018–July 2020), Chen Gang (October 2020–December 2020), Lian Yimin (from September 2021), Wang Zhengpu (from October 2021)
- Standing Committee members: Zhao Kezhi (until 28 October 2017), Zhang Qingwei (until April 2017), Li Ganjie (until May 2017), Chen Chaoying (until January 2017), Tian Xiangli (until December 2017), Liang Tiangeng (until October 2020), Yuan Tongli, Jiao Yanlong, Dong Qinsheng, Xing Guohui (until April 2021), Shang Liguang (until June 2017), Gao Zhili, Liang Huiling (January 2017–October 2018), Xu Qin (April 2017–October 2021), Chen Gang (May 2017–December 2020), Tong Jianming (July 2017–June 2018), Wang Dongfeng (from October 2017), Wang Hao (December 2017–September 2019), Han Xiaodong (December 2017–May 2018), Zhao Yide (March 2018–July 2020), Ran Wanxiang (from August 2018), Liu Shuang (October 2018–November 2021), Li Ning (from November 2018), Zhang Gujiang (from January 2020), Lian Yimin (from October 2020), Zhang Guohua (from December 2020), Zhang Zheng (from March 2021), Zhang Chaochao (from April 2021), Wang Zhengpu (from October 2021), Liu Changlin (from November 2021), Ke Jun (from November 2021)

10th Provincial Party Committee (November 2021–)

- Secretary: Wang Dongfeng (until 22 April 2022), Ni Yuefeng (22 April 2022–31 July 2026), Luo Wen (since 31 July 2026)
- Deputy Secretaries: Wang Zhengpu, Lian Yimin (until January 2023)
- Standing Committee members: Wang Dongfeng (until 22 April 2022), Wang Zhengpu, Lian Yimin (until January 2023), Zhang Chaochao, Liu Changlin, Zhang Zheng (until February 2024), Zhang Guohua, Xia Yanjun, Ge Haijiao (until March 2023), Ke Jun, Dong Xiaoyu, Wu Weidong, Zhao Ge (until May 2022, died of illness), Wang Jiping (April 2022–April 2023), Ni Yuefeng (from 22 April 2022), Fu Xiaodong (from April 2023), Yan Pengcheng (May 2023–April 2024), Zhang Chengzhong (July 2023–March 2026), Zuo Li (from February 2024), Chang Bin (from April 2024)
