= Liu Zihou =

Chinese politician, Governor of Hebei and Hubei (1909–2001)

- 刘子厚

Chairman of the Hebei Revolutionary Committee
- In office 24 January 1971 – 26 December 1979
- Preceded by: Li Xuefeng
- Succeeded by: Jin Ming

First Secretary of Hebei
- In office 25 August 1966 – 3 February 1968
- Preceded by: Lin Tie
- Succeeded by: Li Xuefeng

Governor of Hebei
- In office 16 April 1958 – 19 January 1967
- Preceded by: Lin Tie
- Succeeded by: Li Xuefeng

Governor of Hubei
- In office 1954–1956
- Preceded by: Li Xiannian
- Succeeded by: Zhang Tixue

Personal details
- Born: December 1909 Ren County, Hebei, Qing China
- Died: December 22, 2001 (aged 92) Beijing, China
- Party: Chinese Communist Party

Liu Zihou (Chinese: 刘子厚; December 1909 – December 22, 2001) was a Communist revolutionary leader and politician of the People's Republic of China. He served as Governor of Hubei and Hebei provinces, and as the top leader of Hebei during the Cultural Revolution, but was ousted from his positions after he opposed the reforms of Deng Xiaoping. He was a protégé of Li Xiannian, one of China's top leaders.

== Communist revolution ==
Liu Zihou was born Liu Wenzhong (刘文忠) in Ren County, southern Hebei province in December 1909. He also used the pseudonym Ma Zhiyuan (马致远). In middle school he secretly participated in revolutionary activities and later joined the Chinese Communist Party in October 1929. In 1935 he was one of the leaders of the peasant riot in southern Hebei, establishing a guerrilla force under the Red Army of China. In 1936 his force was expanded to a division and Liu became the division commander. During the Second Sino-Japanese War and the subsequent Chinese Civil War, he was a leader of the Communist guerrilla forces in the border region of Hubei and Henan provinces.

== Early PRC ==
After the Communists defeated the Kuomintang and established the People's Republic of China in 1949, Liu Zihou became a leader of Hubei, and was the provincial governor from 1954 to 1956. From 1956 to 1958 he was appointed head of the Sanmenxia Dam project on the Yellow River. In April 1958 he was appointed Governor of his native Hebei province, subordinate to Lin Tie, the First Secretary of the Communist Party and top official in Hebei. In Hebei Liu was a proponent of class struggle and was praised by Chairman Mao Zedong.

== Cultural Revolution ==
In May 1966, the beginning of the Cultural Revolution, Liu Zihou made a bid for the top office of Hebei. He courted Li Xuefeng, party chief of North China, which includes Hebei province, and denounced the Hebei party chief Lin Tie. Lin was stripped of his positions and detained by the military. Liu then persecuted many war heroes including his own former associates, resulting in at least thirty-three deaths. On August 25 the Central Committee of the Chinese Communist Party appointed Governor Liu as First Secretary of Hebei and Political Commissar of the Hebei Military Region. Having consolidated power over party, government, and army, Liu ruled Hebei like a monarch.

In January 1967, however, Liu Zihou was attacked and detained by the Red Guards in Baoding, which had been designated the temporary capital of Hebei. When Liu arrived in Baoding, two major rival Red Guard factions, both of which included supporters of the former party chief Lin Tie, united to overthrow and capture Liu. On January 29, the Red Guards of the August First faction paraded Liu on a truck for five hours, which was reportedly witnessed by a million people. On February 11, the 69th Army of the PLA commanded by General Xie Zhenhua jailed 1000 members of the August First Red Guards, and restored Liu Zihou to power.

At the end of February, 100,000 soldiers of the 38th Army loyal to Marshall Lin Biao, the designated successor of Chairman Mao Zedong, entered Baoding from Beijing, while some units of the 69th Army were transferred to neighbouring Shanxi province. In April, both Chairman Mao and Lin Biao criticized the February suppression of the Red Guards. The two rival armies armed their respective supporters (including high school students), who clashed with each other, resulting in high death toll. The bloodshed continued off and on until the end of the Cultural Revolution in 1976.

By summer 1967, Liu was again consolidating his power in Hebei. Worried about the situation in Hebei, which surrounds the capital Beijing, in December Chairman Mao sent Chen Boda and Li Xuefeng to the province. Revolutionary leaders all over Hebei, with the exception of Baoding, called for an alliance of the military and Liu Zihou's supporters.

In mid-January 1968, the Beijing Military Region helped to create the Revolutionary Committee of Hebei, chaired by Li Xuefeng, the party boss of North China. Liu Zihou was nominally the first deputy chair, but the de facto head. The military exerted strong influence over the 121-member committee, but the 38th Army in Baoding still backed the rebels and challenged Liu's authority. On 29 January 1968, the capital of Hebei was moved from Baoding to Shijiazhuang.

In 1971, national political circumstances changed when Lin Biao died in a mysterious plane crash over Mongolia, and Li Xuefeng and Chen Boda were thrown into prison.

On 28 July 1976, the Great Tangshan earthquake, the deadliest of the 20th century, struck the city of Tangshan in northeastern Hebei. As the top official of Hebei, Liu Zihou led the relief effort in the aftermath of the earthquake.

== Reform era ==
After the death of Mao Zedong and the fall of the Gang of Four in 1976, Liu Zihou supported Mao's designated successor Hua Guofeng and resisted Deng Xiaoping's reformist agenda. On 26 December 1979, he was ousted from his long-held positions in Hebei province. However, with the help of his patron, the senior party leader Li Xiannian, in January 1980 he became the deputy director of the State Planning Commission of China. Liu retired in 1982 and died in Beijing on 22 December 2001, aged 92.

Liu was an alternate member of the eighth Central Committee of the Chinese Communist Party, and a full member of the ninth to eleventh Central Committees.

== Notes ==
Political offices
Preceded by Li Xiannian	Governor of Hubei; 1954–1956	Succeeded by Zhang Tixue
Preceded by Lin Tie	Governor of Hebei; 1958–1968	Succeeded by Li Xuefeng as Chairman of Revolutionary Committee of Hebei
Preceded by Lin Tie	First Secretary of Hebei; 1966–1968	Succeeded by Li Xuefeng as Chairman of Revolutionary Committee of Hebei
Preceded by Li Xuefeng	Chairman of the Hebei Revolutionary Committee; 1971–1979	Succeeded by Jin Ming as Communist Party Secretary of Hebei
Preceded by Li Xuefeng	Chairman of the Hebei Revolutionary Committee; 1971–1979	Succeeded by Li Erzhong as Governor of Hebei
