= Zhang Yunchuan =

Chinese politician

Zhang Yunchuan (simplified Chinese: 张云川; traditional Chinese: 張雲川; pinyin: Zhāng Yúnchuān; born 1946) is a politician of the People's Republic of China, and the former secretary of CPC Hebei committee.

Born in Dongyang, Zhejiang Province, Zhang graduated from Institute of Military Engineering in Harbin in 1970, majoring in internal combustion engine of ship. He then served in 6214 factory affiliated to 6th ministry of mechanics for long time. He joined Chinese Communist Party (CCP) in 1973. In 1985, he was appointed as vice mayor of Jiujiang, Jiangxi Province. Next year he was appointed as administrative governor of Ganzhou area. In 1991, he was promoted to governor assistant of Jiangxi, and became vice governor in 1993. He was appointed as vice Chairman of Xinjiang Uyghur Autonomous Region in 1995. Zhang was transferred to Hunan in 1998 and appointed as vice secretary of CCP Hunan committee and secretary of Changsha municipal committee. He became acting governor of Hunan in 2001, and governor the next year.

In March 2003, he was transferred to central government and became the chairman of Commission of Science, Technology and Industry for National Defense. In August 2007, he was appointed to secretary of CCP Hebei committee, and was elected as Chairman of standing committee of Hebei People's Congress in January 2008.

Zhang was a member of 16th and 17th Central Committees of CCP.
