= Gao Yang (politician) =

Chinese politician

Gao Yang (Chinese: 高扬) (1909–2009) was a Chinese politician. He was born in Liaoyang County, Liaoning Province. He was Chinese Communist Party Committee Secretary of Hebei Province (1982–1986) and President of the Central Party School of the Chinese Communist Party (1987–1989). He was a member of the State Council of the People's Republic of China (1965–1970).

Preceded by Jin Ming	Communist Party Chief of Hebei	Succeeded by Xing Chongzhi
