= Li Xuefeng =

Chinese politician

- 李雪峰
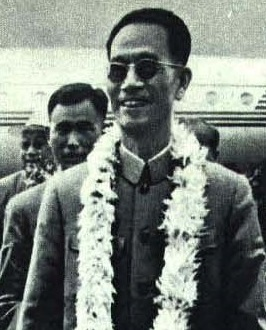
- Li on a state visit to Indonesia in 1965

2nd First Secretary of the CCP Beijing Committee
- In office May 1966 – April 1967
- Preceded by: Peng Zhen
- Succeeded by: Xie Fuzhi (As Head of the Beijing Revolutionary Committee)

Personal details
- Born: 19 January 1907 Yongji County, Shanxi, China
- Died: 15 March 2003 (aged 96) Beijing
- Party: Chinese Communist Party

Li Xuefeng (Chinese: 李雪峰; pinyin: Lǐ Xuěfēng; Wade–Giles: Li Hsueh-feng; 19 January 1907 – 15 March 2003) was a Chinese politician. He occupied several prominent regional offices prior to the founding of the People's Republic in 1949. In 1960 he became the first political commissar of the Beijing Military Region. He took over the Beijing party organization as its First Secretary after the purge of Peng Zhen in May 1966, and was sent to take the reins of Hebei's Revolutionary Committee between 1968 and 1971. However, his support for Chen Boda during the 1971 Lushan Conference led him to be branded as a supporter of Lin Biao; he was purged and sent into internal exile in Anhui province for eight years. He was politically rehabilitated in 1982, and went on to serve in several advisory positions in the party.

== Biography ==
Li Xuefeng joined the Chinese Communist Party in 1933 and served in several roles, like propaganda chief or organization chief in the Party committees of Shanxi, Beijing, Hebei and Henan. Hebei and Henan were long under the Zhili Province before being split by the Republic of China in 1928.

In 1947, he was appointed deputy secretary of the "Central Plains Bureau" of the Central Committee of the Chinese Communist Party, an office responsible for coordinating military efforts around the Yellow River, and concurrently deputy director of the Central Organization Department. In addition, in 1949 he was secretary of the CCP Henan Committee and political commissar of the Henan Military Region.

After the establishment of the People's Republic of China in 1949, Li was appointed head of the Organization Department of the Central-South China Bureau of the CCP Central Committee, as well as deputy secretary of the Bureau, and concurrently vice-chairman of the Central-South Administrative Council. In 1954 he was elevated to Deputy General Secretary of the Central Committee directly under Deng Xiaoping, and head of the Transports and Communications Department in 1956. He was also a member of the Standing Committee of the National People's Congress from 1954 to 1963.

He was elected a full member of the CCP Central Committee at the Eight National Congress held in 1956. In 1960 he was transferred to the posts of first secretary of the North China Bureau of the Central Committee and first political commissar of the Beijing Military Region.

With the outburst of the Cultural Revolution, Li Xuefeng was seen as one of its early supporters. After Peng Zhen, Mayor of Beijing, was overthrown for opposing Mao Zedong over the course of the Cultural Revolution in May 1966, Li Xuefeng replaced him as first secretary of the CCP Beijing Committee, and in August he was promoted an alternate member of the CCP Politburo. His first acts as Party chief in Beijing were to dismiss the editorial boards of several local newspapers and the CCP committee in the University of Beijing, provisionally replacing it with a "work team" charged with providing political education to the students and pushing them to join the Cultural Revolution movement.

His perceived low support for the Red Guards and Mao's criticism towards the "work teams", thought to be harmful to the Cultural Revolution and the source of the students' inner fighting, led to Li's rapid downfall. In 1967, as both the Beijing Municipal Government and CCP Municipal Committee were reorganized in a Revolutionary Committee, Li was sent to Tianjin away from limelight. He resurfaced in February 1968, when he was appointed chairman of the Revolutionary Committee of Hebei Province; in April 1968, he was confirmed as an alternate member of the Politburo at the Ninth Congress of the CCP.

In 1971, Li's support for Chen Boda during the troublesome Second Plenary Session of the Ninth Central Committee held in Lushan in 1970 led him to be identified as a member of Lin Biao's conspiracy against Mao, who called him one of Lin's "big generals". Thus, he was sent to confinement in Anhui for eight years. The accusation of being part of Chen Boda's "anti-party clique" was confirmed in 1973 at the Party's Tenth Congress.

Li Xuefeng was never expelled from the Party, and, despite his ambivalent attitude during the Cultural Revolution, he was rehabilitated in 1982. In June 1983, he was elected member of the Standing Committee of the National Committee of the Chinese People's Political Consultative Conference, a post he had previously held from 1959 to 1965. He was also a member of the Central Advisory Committee.

After having retired from political roles between the late 1980s and early 1990s, Li Xuefeng died in Beijing in 2003, aged 96.

== See also ==
- Politics of Beijing

Political offices
Preceded by Liu Zihou	Chairman of the Revolutionary Committee of Hebei; 1968–1971	Succeeded by Liu Zihou
Party political offices
Preceded by Peng Zhen	Secretary of the CCP Beijing Committee; 1966–1967	Succeeded by Xie Fuzhi; Vacant until 1971
Military offices
Preceded by	Political commissar of the Beijing Military Region; 1960–1967	Succeeded by Xie Fuzhi
