= Lin Jingzhen =

Chinese banker (born 1965)

- 林景臻

Vice Governor of the Bank of China
- In office March 2018 – January 2025
- Governor: Liu Liange; Wang Jiang; Liu Jin; Zhang Hui

Personal details
- Born: May 1965 (age 61) Hui'an County, Fujian, China
- Party: Chinese Communist Party (until 2026)
- Education: Xiamen University

Lin Jingzhen (Chinese: 林景臻; pinyin: Lín Jǐngzhēn; born May 1965) is a retired Chinese banker who served as vice governor of the Bank of China from 2018 to 2025. He was investigated by China's top anti-graft agency in September 2025.

== Early life and education ==
Lin was born in the town of Wangchuan in Hui'an County, Fujian, in May 1965. He graduated from Xiamen University with a bachelor's degree in economics and a master's degree in business administration.

== Career ==
Lin joined the Bank of China in 1987. In his early years, he was sent to work in Hong Kong and later worked at the Xiamen Branch. In October 2010, he was promoted to general manager at the Corporate Finance Headquarters of Bank of China, and held that office until May 2015, when he was appointed vice president of the BOC Hong Kong (Holdings) Limited. In March 2018, he was promoted again to vice governor of the Bank of China, concurrently serving as chairman of the BOC International Holdings Limited, chairman of the BOC International Securities Limited, and non-executive director of the BOC Hong Kong (Holdings) Limited. He retired on 7 January 2025.

== Downfall ==
On 9 September 2025, Lin was put under investigation for alleged "serious violations of discipline and laws" by the Central Commission for Discipline Inspection (CCDI), the party's internal disciplinary body, and the National Supervisory Commission, the highest anti-corruption agency of China.

The next year in February he was expelled from the Chinese Communist Party.

Business positions
New title	Chairman of the BOC International Securities Limited; 2018–2022	Succeeded by Ning Min (宁敏)
