= Central Financial Work Conference =

- Simplified Chinese: 中央金融工作会议
- Traditional Chinese: 中央金融工作會議
Transcriptions
Standard Mandarin
- Hanyu Pinyin: Zhōngyāng Jīnróng Gōngzuò Huìyì

National Financial Work Conference
- Simplified Chinese: 全国金融工作会议
- Traditional Chinese: 全國金融工作會議
Transcriptions
Standard Mandarin
- Hanyu Pinyin: Quánguó Jīnróng Gōngzuò Huìyì

The Central Financial Work Conference, previously known as the National Financial Work Conference, is the highest-level conference in China in regards to financial work. It is held every five years.

== History ==
The first meeting of the National Financial Work Conference was held in 1997, in reaction to the Asian financial crisis. The Conference decided to establish the Central Financial Work Commission, the China Securities Regulatory Commission and the China Insurance Regulatory Commission to supervise China's financial system. It also agreed to establish four asset management companies to take over non-performing assets from banks.

The second meeting, held in 2002, officially proposed "turning banks into modern financial enterprises". It set up the China Banking Regulatory Commission to deal wit debt loads, undercapitalization non-transparent business practices in banks. It also drafted policies to support joint-stock reform and the overseas listings of China's four largest banks.

The third meeting, held in 2007, emphasized financial reform in rural areas and foreign exchange reserve management.

The fourth meeting, held in 2012, stated that "finance should serve the real economy" and emphasized on "preventing financial risks is the lifeline of financial work". It also mentioned risks from local government debt, instructing local governments to "properly handle existing debt" and "include debt classification into budget management".

The fifth meeting, held in 2017, emphasized de-risking and financial reform. In the meeting, General Secretary of the Chinese Communist Party (CCP) Xi Jinping stated that "preventing systemic financial risks was an eternal theme of financial work", meaning that it was necessary to regulate financial market transactions and strengthen internet financial supervision. The meeting included mentions about the internationalization of the renminbi and financial innovation in the Belt and Road Initiative. It also led to the establishment of the Financial Stability and Development Committee.

In 2023, the name of the Conference was changed to the Central Financial Work Conference., indicating greater direct CCP oversight of finance. The conference was held between 30 and 31 October 2023, delayed on year due to zero-COVID policies. Chaired by CCP General Secretary Xi Jinping, Premier Li Qiang also gave a speech at the conference. It was attended by all members of the CCP Politburo Standing Committee and the larger CCP Politburo. Xi retaliated that "preventing systemic financial risks was an eternal theme of financial work" and stated that China must "comprehensively strengthen financial supervision" and "bring all financial activities under control in accordance with the law". He stated that the Chinese government must focus on identifying and resolving hidden financial risks.

The conference pledged to "optimize the debt structure of central and local governments"; debt in China has long been concentrated among local governments. The conference also emphasized the use of "Marxist financial theory" and CCP leadership over the financial sector, stating that "we must adhere to the centralized and unified leadership of the Communist party in financial work". It mentioned setting up a long-term mechanism to tackle and control local government debt risks, as well as setting up a government debt management system.

== Functions ==
The Conference is the highest-level conference in China in regards to financial issues. It is held every five years and is usually chaired by a top-level official.
