= Car classification =

Categorisation of cars according to vehicle regulations or market segments

Governments and private organizations have developed car classification schemes that are used for various purposes including regulation, description, and categorization of cars.

The International Standard ISO 3833-1977 Road vehicles – Types – Terms and definitions also defines terms for classifying cars.

== Summary of classifications ==
The following table summarises the commonly used terms of market segments and legal classifications.

Car market segments and legal classifications
Euro Car Segment	Euro NCAP Class	US EPA Size Class	China National Standard GB/T 3730.1	Other common segment terms	Examples
Quadricycle	—	—	—	Microcar; Bubble car	Bond Bug, Smart ForTwo, Isetta, Mega City, Renault Twizy
A-segment mini cars	Supermini	Minicompact	Micro (A00)	City car Kei car (JP)	Chevrolet Spark, Fiat 500, Kia Picanto, Suzuki Alto, Renault Twingo
B-segment small cars	Supermini	Subcompact	Subcompact (A0)	—	Ford Fiesta, Kia Rio, Opel Corsa, Peugeot 208, Volkswagen Polo
C-segment medium cars	Small family car	Compact	Compact (A)	—	Hyundai Elantra, Ford Focus, Toyota Corolla, Volkswagen Golf
C-segment medium cars	Small family car	Compact	Compact (A)	Subcompact executive	Acura ILX, Audi A3, BMW 1 Series, Lexus CT, Mercedes-Benz A-Class
D-segment large cars	Large family car	Mid-size	Mid-size (B)	—	Ford Mondeo, Toyota Camry, Peugeot 508, Mazda6, Volkswagen Passat
D-segment large cars	Large family car	Mid-size	Mid-size (B)	Compact executive (U.K.); Entry-level luxury (U.S.)	Alfa Romeo Giulia, Audi A4, BMW 3 Series, Lexus IS, Mercedes-Benz C-Class
E-segment executive cars	Executive	Large	Full-size (C/D)	Full-size car (U.S.)	Chevrolet Impala, Chrysler 300, Ford Taurus, Holden Caprice, Toyota Avalon
E-segment executive cars	Executive	Large	Full-size (C/D)	Mid-size luxury (U.S.)	Audi A6, BMW 5 Series, Cadillac CT5, Mercedes-Benz E-Class, Tesla Model S
F-segment luxury cars	—	Large	Full-size (C/D)	Full-size luxury (U.S.); Luxury saloon (U.K.)	Genesis G90, BMW 7 Series, Jaguar XJ, Mercedes-Benz S-Class, Porsche Panamera
S-segment sports coupés	—	—	—	Supercar	Bugatti Chiron, LaFerrari, Lamborghini Aventador, Pagani Huayra, Porsche 918 Spyder
S-segment sports coupés	—	—	—	Convertible	Chevrolet Camaro, Mercedes-Benz CLK, Volvo C70, Volkswagen Eos, Opel Cascada
S-segment sports coupés	Roadster sports	Two-seater	—	Roadster Sports car	BMW Z4, Lotus Elise, Mazda MX-5, Porsche Boxster, Mercedes-Benz SLK
M-segment multi purpose cars	Small MPV	Minivan	Subcompact MPV (A0)	Mini MPV	Citroën C3 Picasso, Kia Venga, Ford B-Max, Opel Meriva, Fiat 500L
M-segment multi purpose cars	Small MPV	Minivan	Compact MPV (A)	Compact MPV	Chevrolet Orlando, Ford C-Max, Suzuki Ertiga, Renault Scénic, Volkswagen Touran
M-segment multi purpose cars	Large MPV	Minivan	Mid-size MPV (B)	People mover (AU)	Chrysler Pacifica (RU), Kia Carnival, Renault Espace, Toyota Sienna, Citroën C4 Grand Picasso
M-segment multi purpose cars	Large MPV	Minivan	Full-size MPV (C)	People mover (AU)	Chrysler Pacifica (RU), Kia Carnival, Renault Espace, Toyota Sienna, Citroën C4 Grand Picasso
J-segment sport utility cars	Small off-road 4x4	Small SUV	Subcompact SUV (A0)	Mini 4x4 (U.K.); Mini SUV (U.S.)	Daihatsu Terios, Ford EcoSport, Jeep Renegade, Peugeot 2008, Suzuki Jimny
J-segment sport utility cars	Small off-road 4x4	Small SUV	Compact SUV (A)	Compact 4x4 (U.K.); Compact SUV	Tesla Model Y, Toyota RAV4, Ford Escape, Honda CR-V, Kia Sportage
J-segment sport utility cars	Large off-road 4x4	Standard SUV	Mid-size SUV (B)	Large 4x4 (U.K., AU); Mid-size SUV (U.S.)	Ford Edge, Hyundai Santa Fe, Jeep Grand Cherokee, Volkswagen Touareg, Volvo XC90
J-segment sport utility cars	Large off-road 4x4	Standard SUV	Full-size SUV (C)	Full-size SUV (U.S.); Large 4x4 (U.K.); Upper Large SUV (AU)	Lincoln Navigator, Range Rover, Chevrolet Suburban, Toyota Land Cruiser, Mercedes-Benz GLS

== Market segments ==
=== Microcar / kei car ===
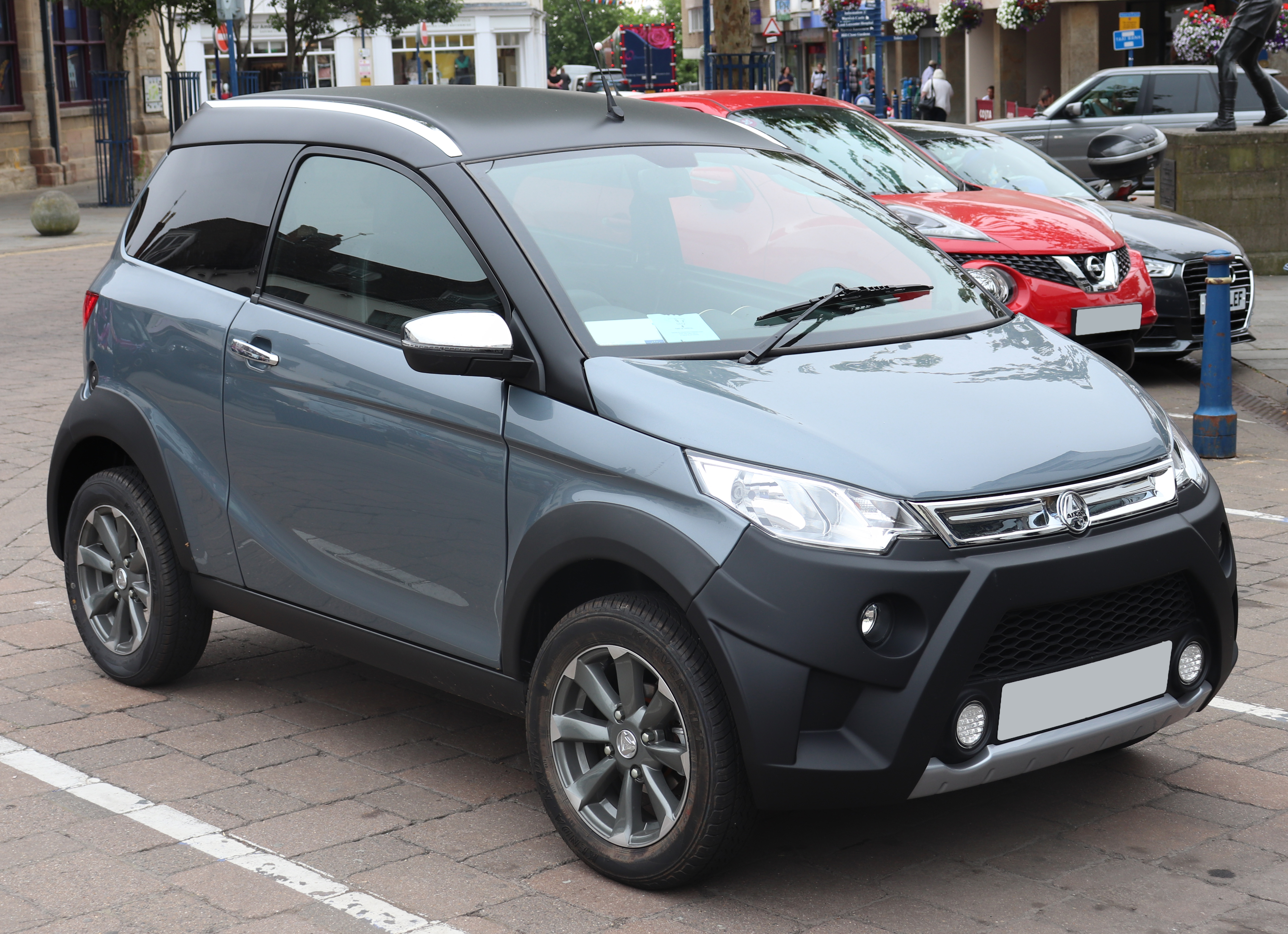
2018 Aixam Crossline

Microcars and their Japanese equivalent— kei cars— are the smallest category of automobile.

Microcars straddle the boundary between car and motorbike, and are often covered by separate regulations from normal cars, resulting in relaxed requirements for registration and licensing. Engine size is often 700 cc (43 cu in) or less, and microcars have three or four wheels.

Microcars are most popular in Europe, where they originated following World War II. The predecessors to micro cars are voiturettes and cycle cars. Kei cars have been used in Japan since 1949.

Examples of microcars and kei cars:

- Honda Life
- Smart ForTwo
- Tata Nano

=== A-segment / City car / Minicompact ===
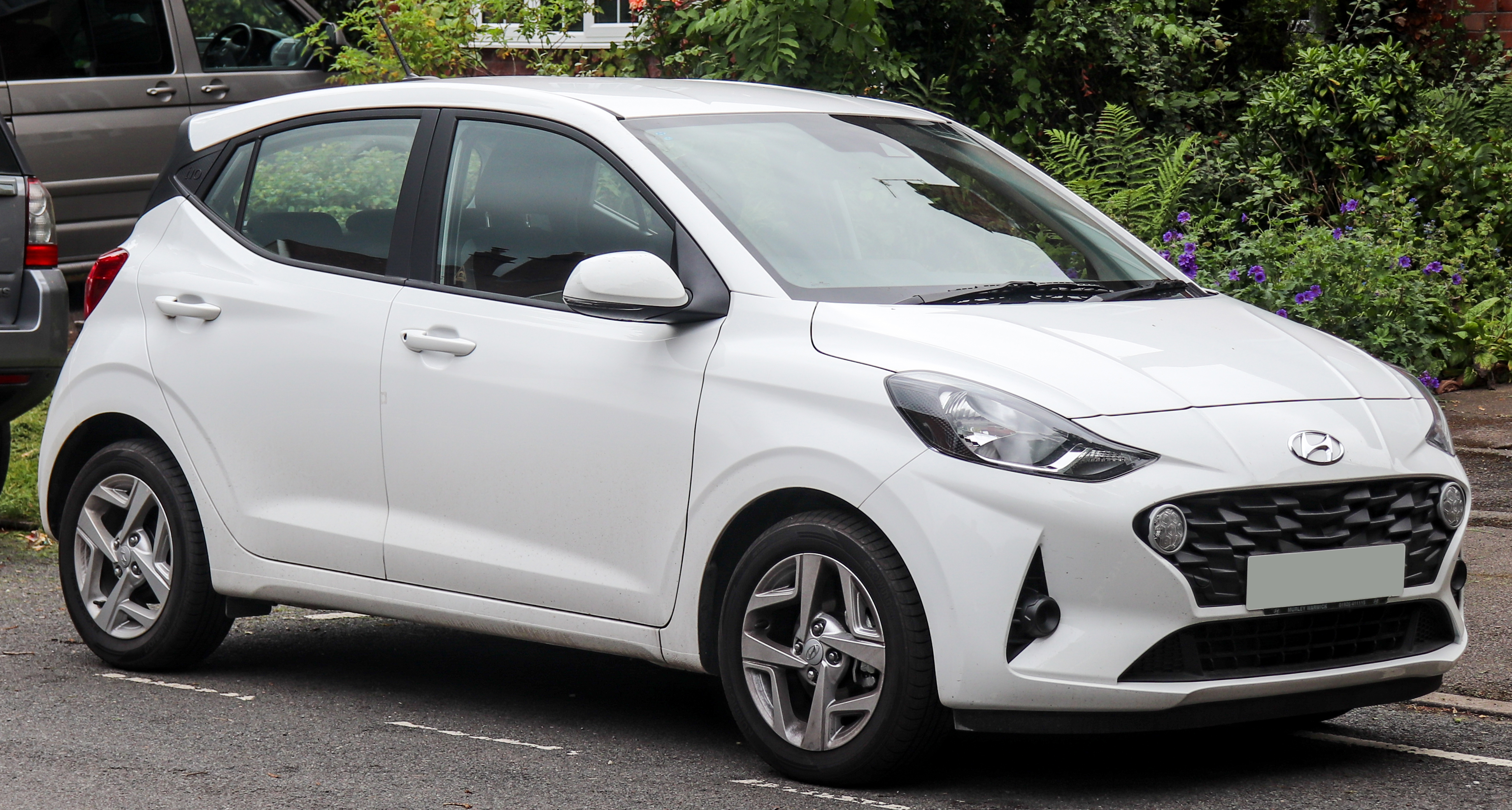
Hyundai i10

The smallest category of vehicles that are registered as normal cars is called A-segment in Europe, or "city car" in Europe and the United States. The United States Environmental Protection Agency defines this category as "minicompact." However, this term is not widely used.

The equivalents of A-segment cars have been produced since the early 1920s. However, the category increased in popularity in the late 1950s when the original Fiat 500 and BMC Mini were released.

Examples of A-segment / city cars / minicompact cars:

- Fiat 500
- Citroen C1
- Toyota Aygo

=== B-segment / Supermini / Subcompact ===
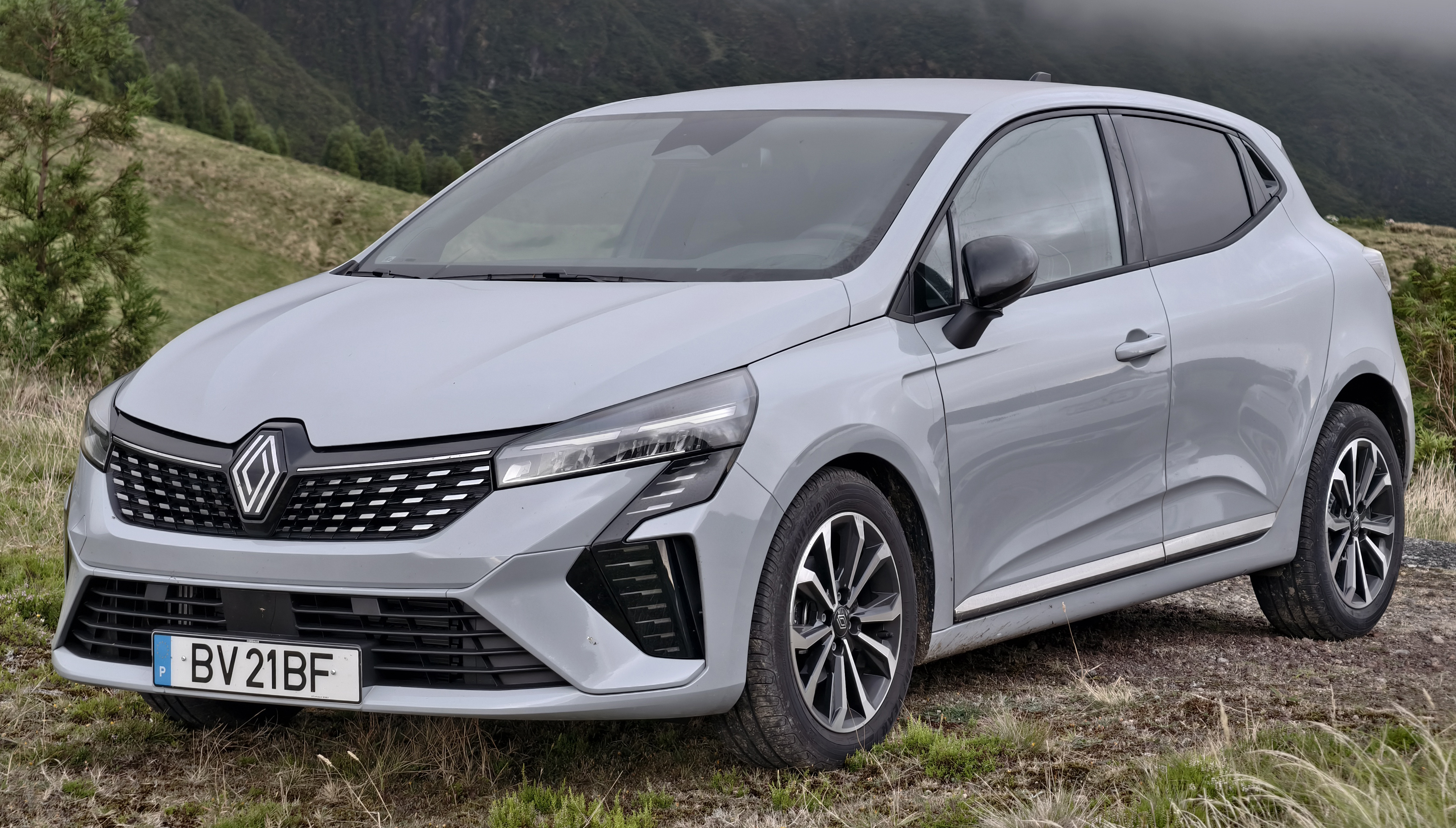
Renault Clio

The next larger category of small cars is called B-segment in Europe, supermini in the United Kingdom and subcompact in the United States.

The size of a subcompact car is defined by the United States Environmental Protection Agency (EPA), as having a combined interior and cargo volume of between 85–99 cubic feet (2,410–2,800 L). Since the EPA's smaller minicompact category is not as commonly used by the general public, A-segment cars are sometimes called subcompacts in the United States. In Europe and Great Britain, the B-segment and supermini categories do not have any formal definitions based on size.

Early supermini cars in Great Britain include the 1977 Ford Fiesta and Vauxhall Chevette.

In the United States, the first locally-built subcompact cars were the 1970 AMC Gremlin, Chevrolet Vega, and Ford Pinto.

Examples of B-segment / supermini / subcompact cars:

- Chevrolet Aveo (Chevrolet Sonic)
- Hyundai Accent
- Volkswagen Polo

=== C-segment / Small family / Compact ===
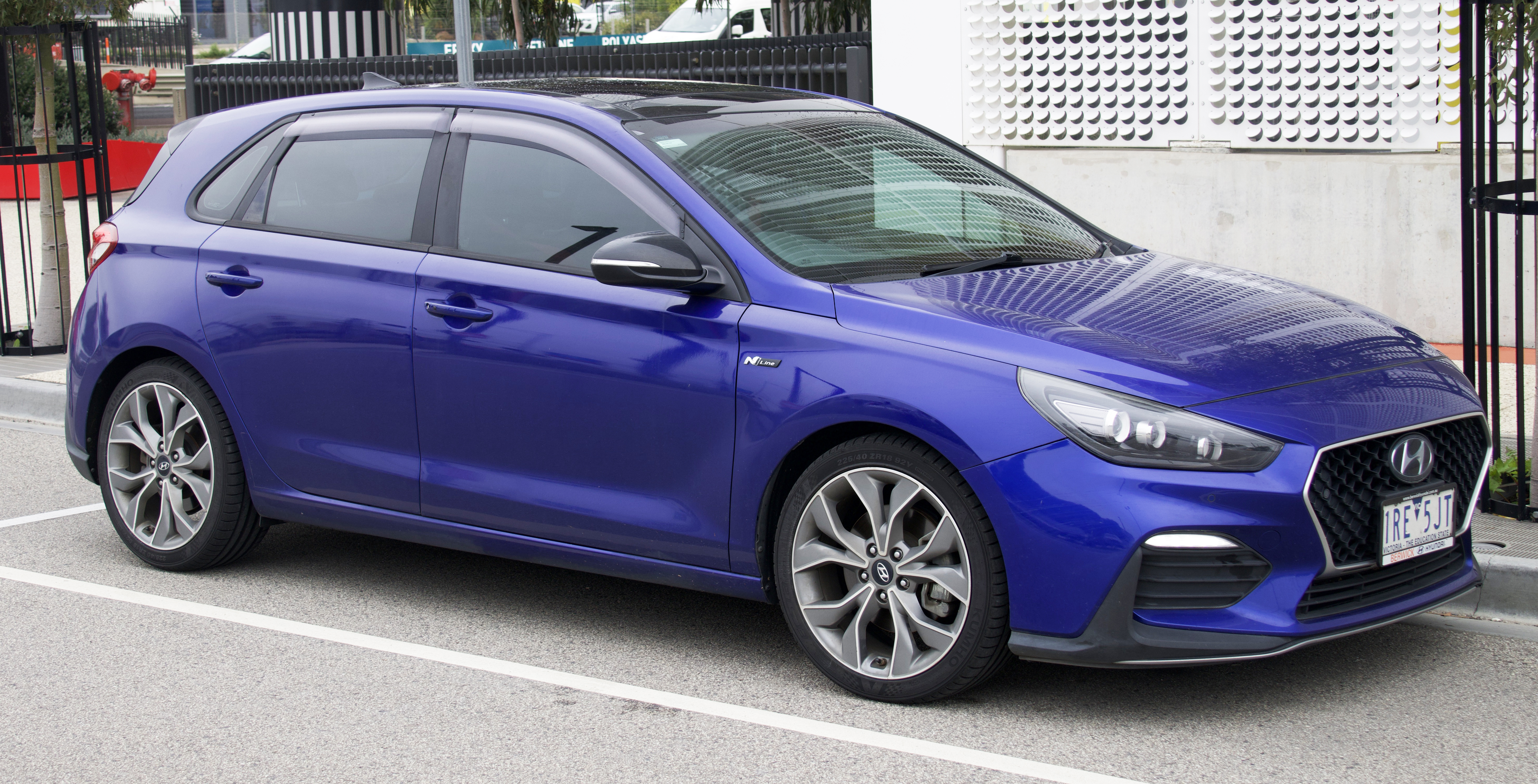
Hyundai i30

The largest category of small cars is called C-segment or small family car in Europe, and compact car in the United States.

The size of a compact car is defined by the United States Environmental Protection Agency (EPA), as having a combined interior and cargo volume of 100–109 cu ft (2.8–3.1 m^{3}).

Examples of C-segment / compact / small family cars:

- Toyota Corolla
- Renault Mégane
- Volkswagen Golf

=== D-segment / Large family / Mid-size ===
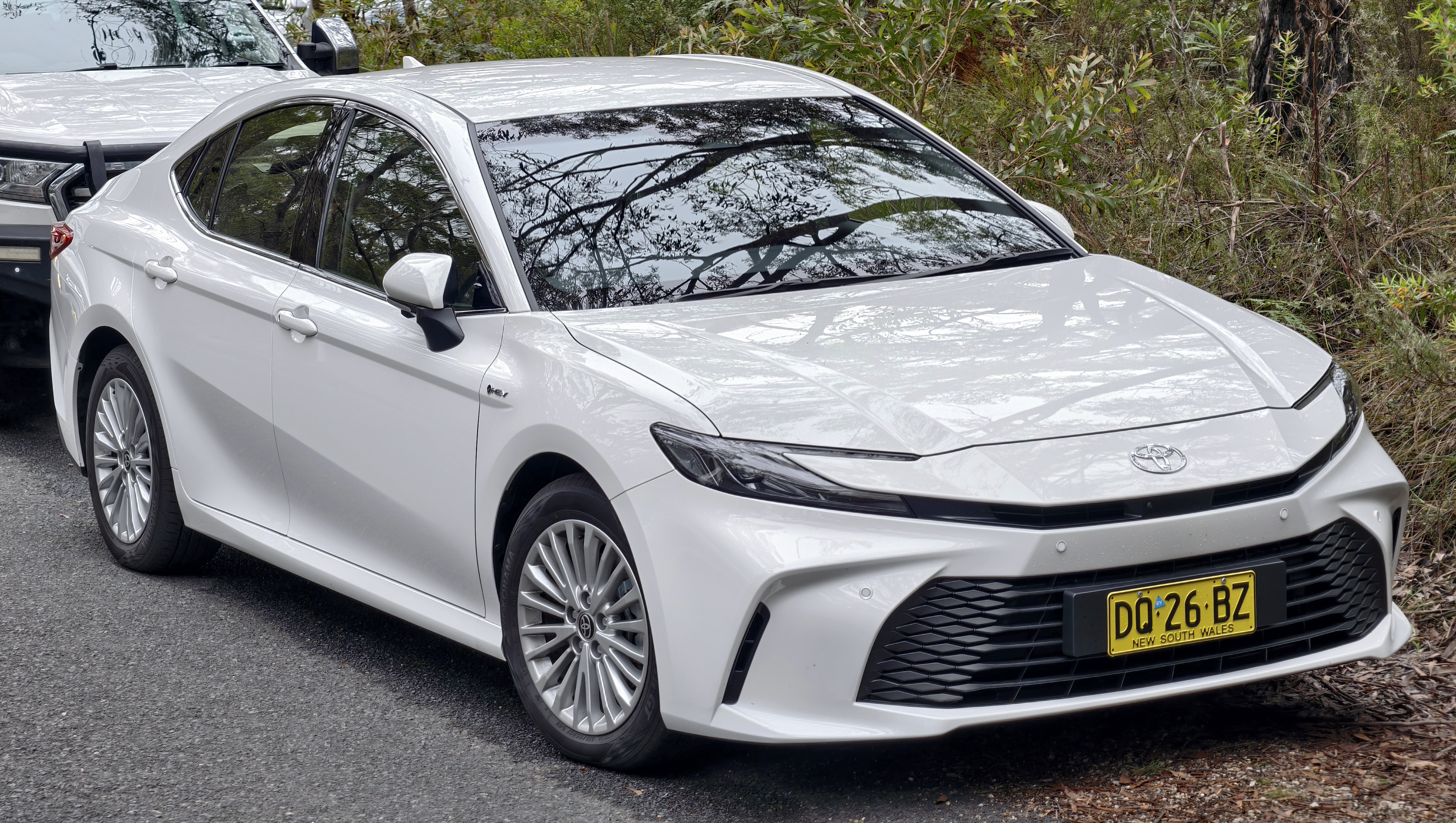
Toyota Camry

In Europe, the third-largest category for passenger cars is called D-segment or large family car.

In the United States, the equivalent term is mid-size or intermediate cars. The U.S. Environmental Protection Agency (EPA) defines a mid-size car as having a combined passenger and cargo volume of 110–119 cu ft (3.1–3.4 m^{3}).

Examples of D-segment / large family / mid-size cars:

- Chevrolet Malibu
- Ford Mondeo
- Kia K5

=== E-segment / Executive / Full-size ===
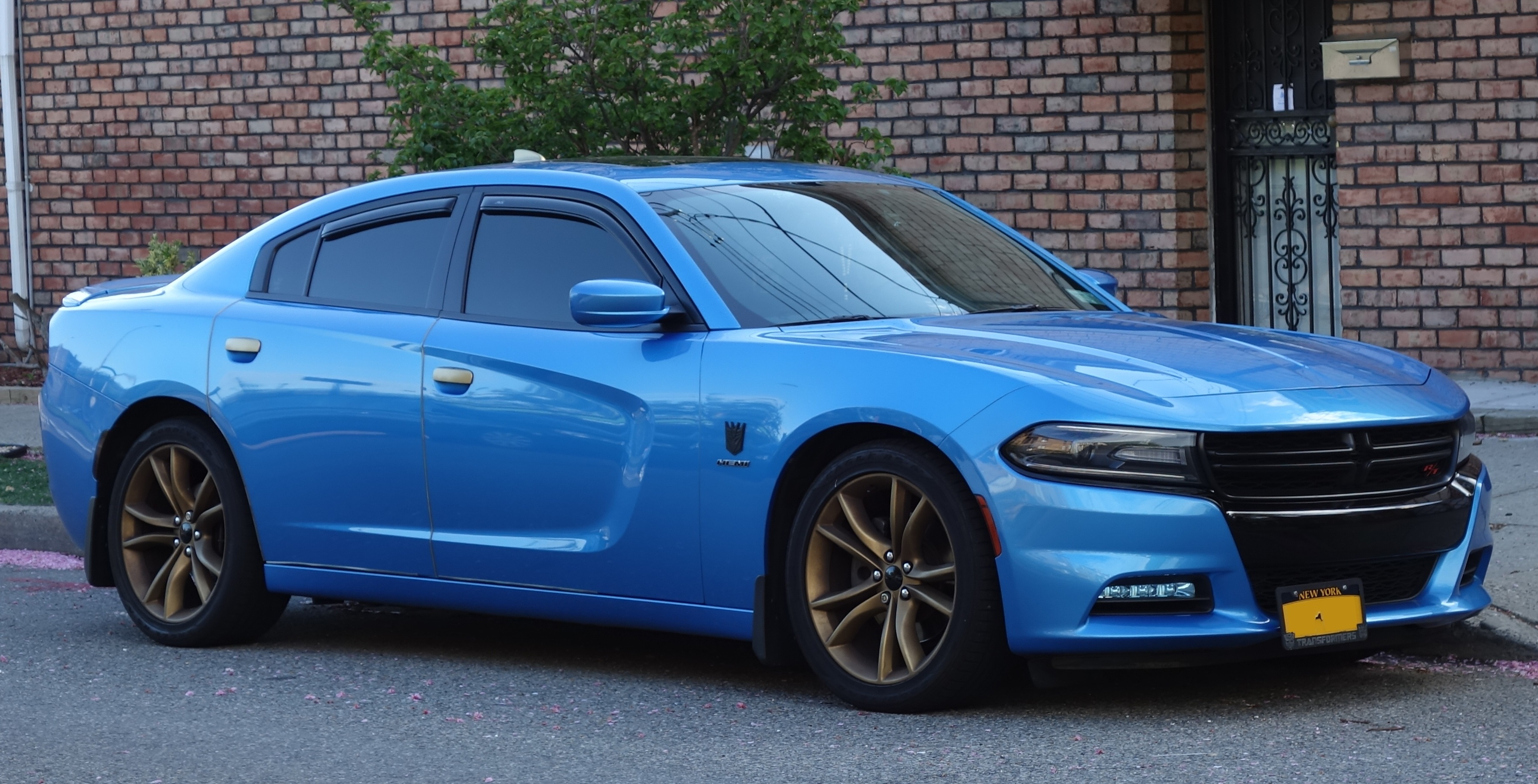
Dodge Charger

In Europe, the second-largest category for passenger cars is E-segment / executive car, which are usually luxury cars.

In other countries, the equivalent terms are full-size car or large car, which are also used for relatively affordable large cars that are not considered luxury cars.

Examples of non-luxury full-size cars:

- Chevrolet Impala
- Toyota Avalon

=== F-segment / Luxury saloon / Full-size luxury ===
See Luxury saloon / full-size luxury section below.

=== S-segment / Sports / Performance cars ===
See Sports / performance cars section below.

== Minivans / MPVs ==
Minivan is an American car classification for vehicles that are designed to transport passengers in the rear seating rows, and have reconfigurable seats in two or three rows. The equivalent terms in British English are multi-purpose vehicle (MPV), people carrier, and people mover. Minivans are often of the "one-box" or "two-box" body configuration, high roofs, flat floors, sliding doors for rear passengers, and high H-point seating.

=== Mini MPV ===
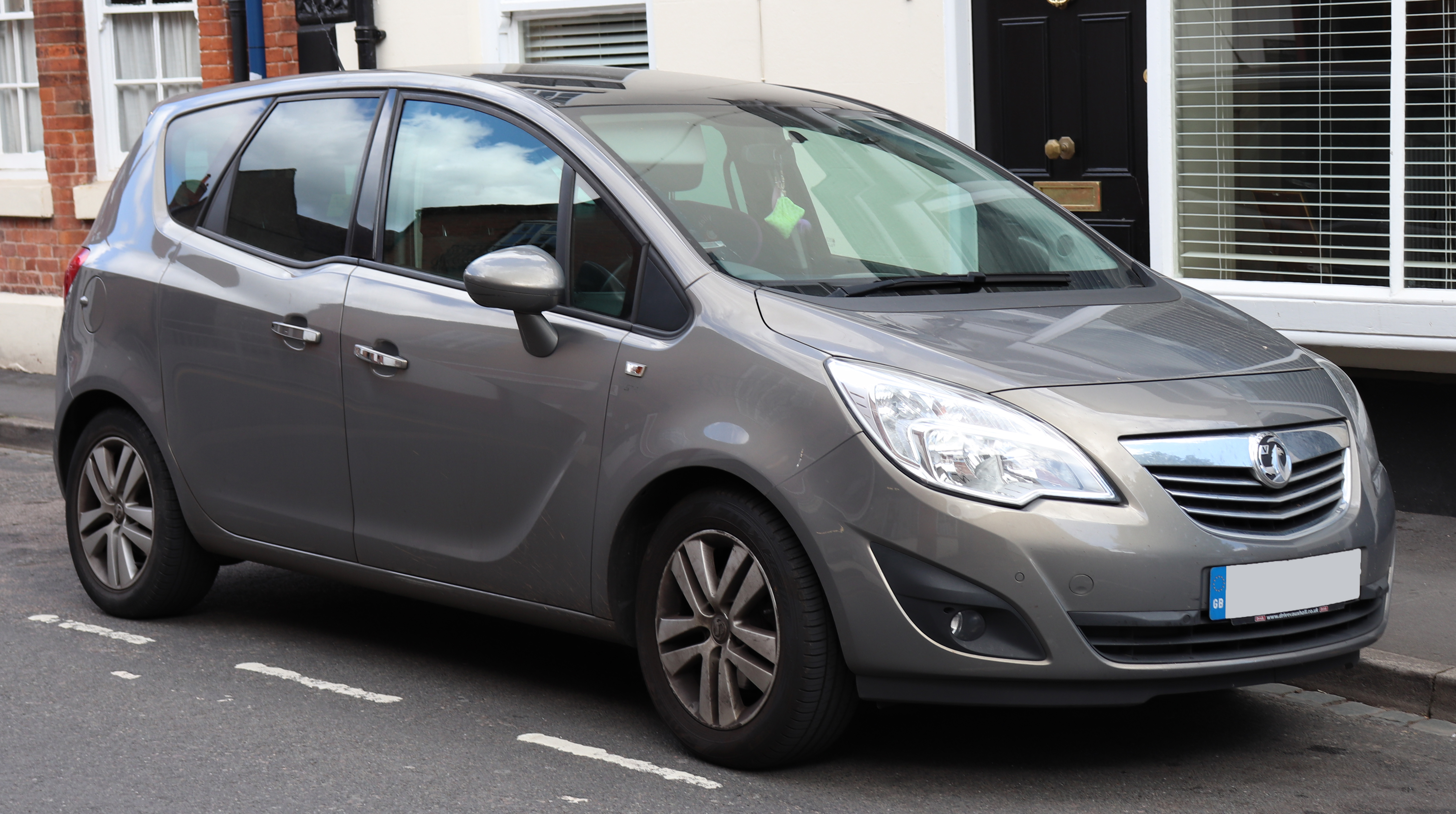
Vauxhall Meriva

Mini MPV is the smallest size of MPVs and the vehicles are often built on the platforms of B-segment hatchback models.

Examples of Mini MPVs:

- Toyota Noah
- Honda Freed
- Ford B-Max

=== Compact MPV ===
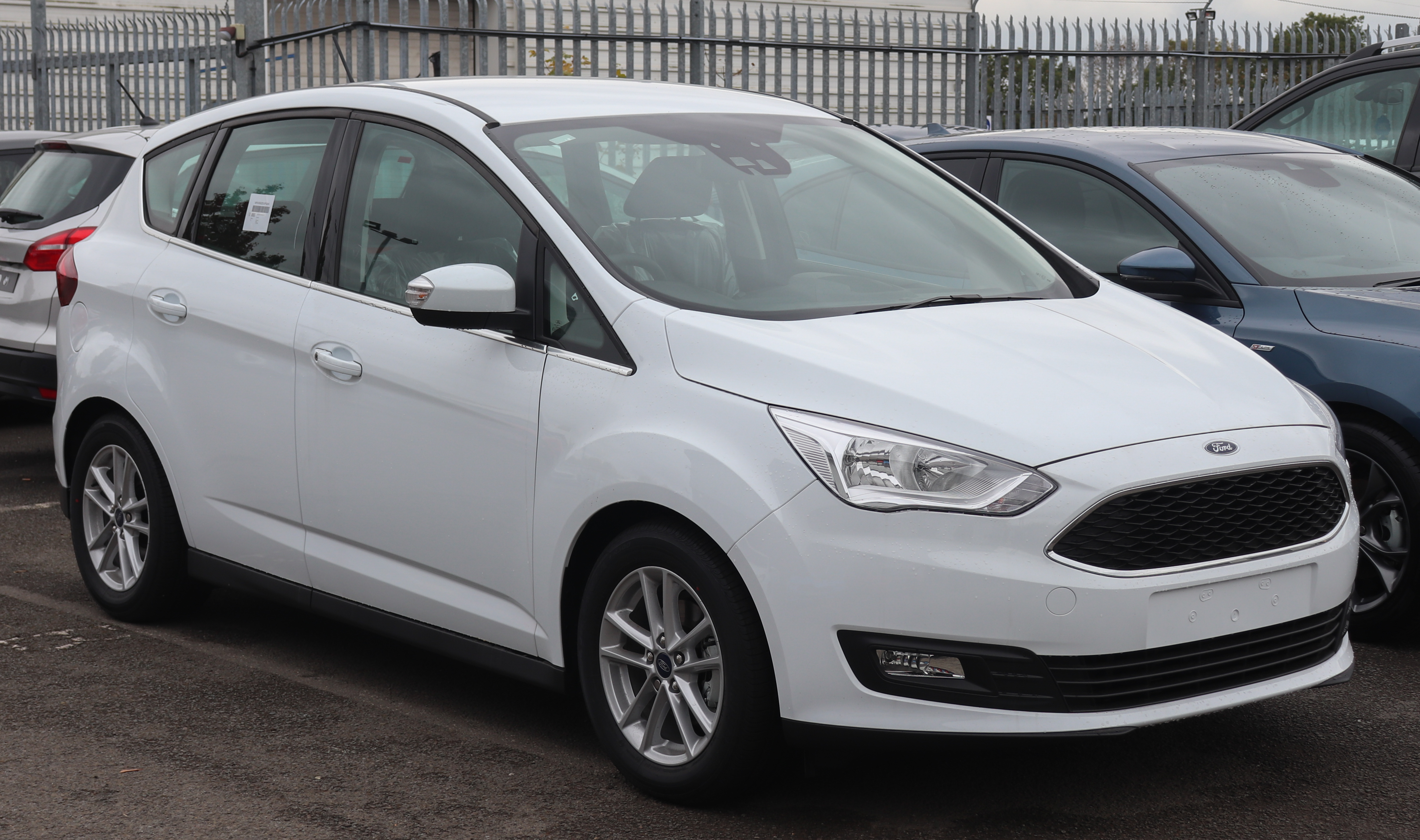
Ford C-Max (2011–2019)

The compact MPV size class includes vehicles between the mini MPV and large MPV (minivan) sizes. Compact MPVs remain predominantly a European phenomenon, although they are also built and sold in many Latin American and Asian markets.

Examples of Compact MPVs:

- Renault Scénic
- Volkswagen Touran
- Ford C-Max

=== Large MPV ===
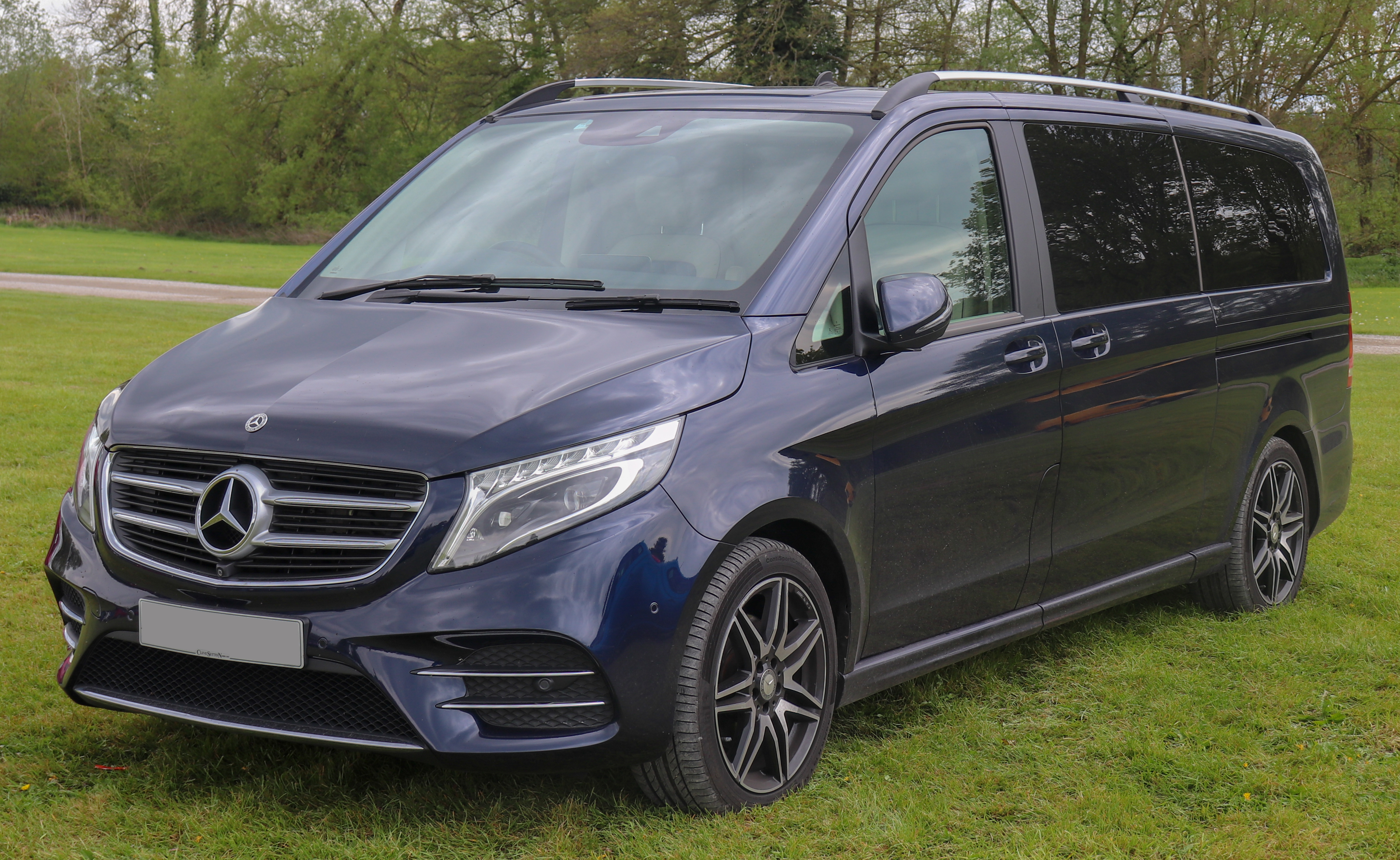
Mercedes-Benz V-Class

The largest size of minivans is also referred to as "large MPV" and became popular following the introduction of the 1984 Renault Espace and Dodge Caravan. Since the 1990s, the smaller compact MPV and mini MPV sizes of minivans have also become popular. If the term "minivan" is used without specifying a size, it usually refers to a large MPV.

Examples of Large MPVs:

- Chrysler Pacifica
- Ford S-Max
- Toyota Sienna

== Luxury vehicles ==
=== Premium compact ===
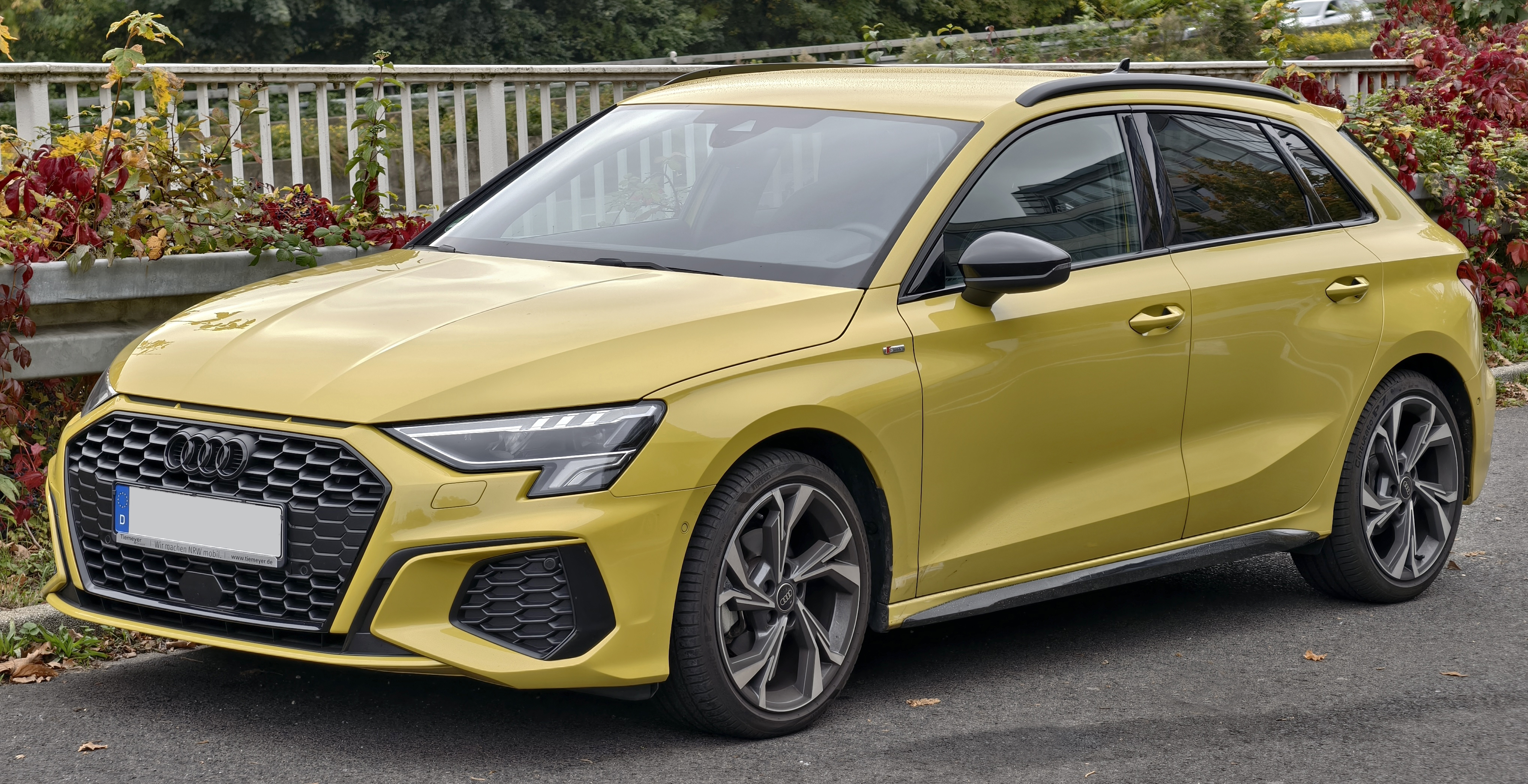
Audi A3

The premium compact class (also called subcompact executive) is the smallest category of luxury cars. It became popular in the mid-2000s, when European manufacturers — such as Audi, BMW, and Mercedes-Benz — introduced new entry-level models that were smaller and cheaper than their compact executive models.

Examples of premium compact cars:

- Acura ILX
- Mercedes-Benz CLA-Class
- Lexus CT200h

=== Compact executive / luxury compact ===
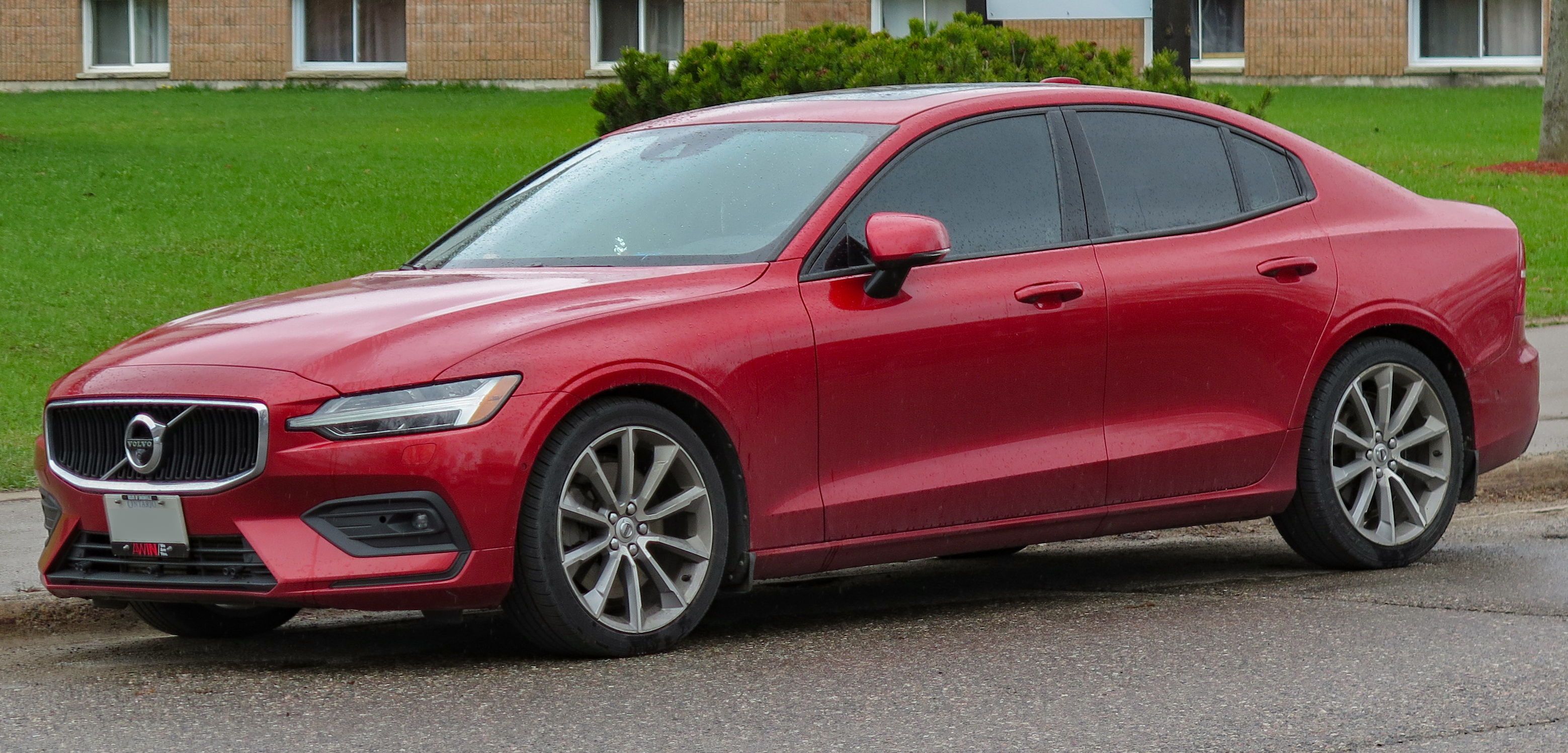
Volvo S60

A compact executive car or a compact luxury car is a premium car larger than a premium compact and smaller than an executive car. Compact executive cars are equivalent size to mid-size cars and are part of the D-segment in the European car classification.

In North American terms, close equivalents are "luxury compact" and "entry-level luxury car", although the latter is also used for the smaller premium compact cars.

Examples of compact executive cars:

- Audi A4
- BMW 3 Series
- Lexus IS

=== Executive / mid-size luxury ===
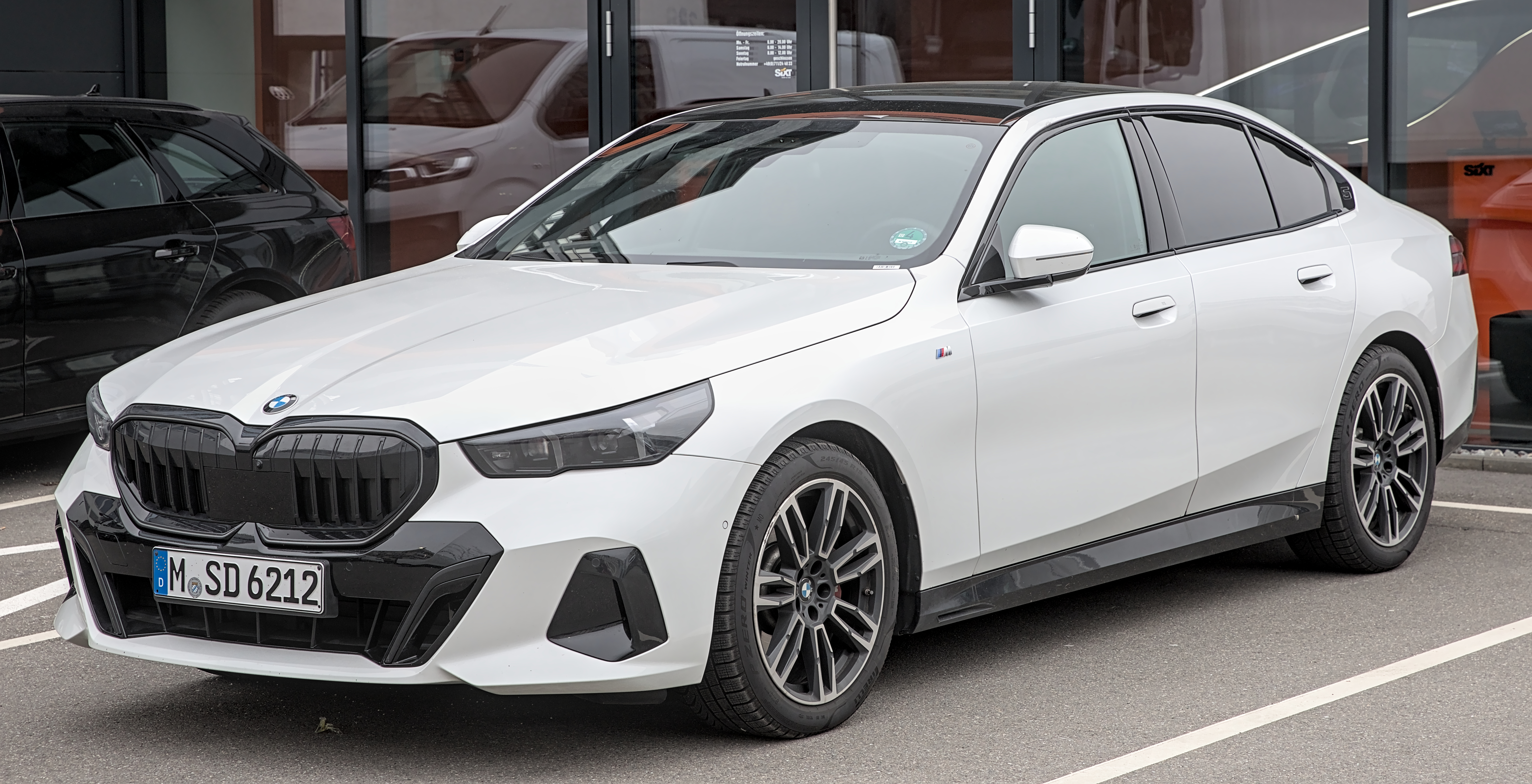
BMW 5 Series

An executive car is a premium car larger than a compact executive and smaller than a full-size luxury car. Executive cars are classified as E-segment cars in the European car classification.

In the United States and several other countries, the equivalent categories are full-size car (not to be confused with the European category of "full-size luxury car") or mid-size luxury car.

Examples of executive cars:

- Mercedes-Benz E-Class
- Lexus GS
- Volvo S90

=== Luxury saloon / full-size luxury ===
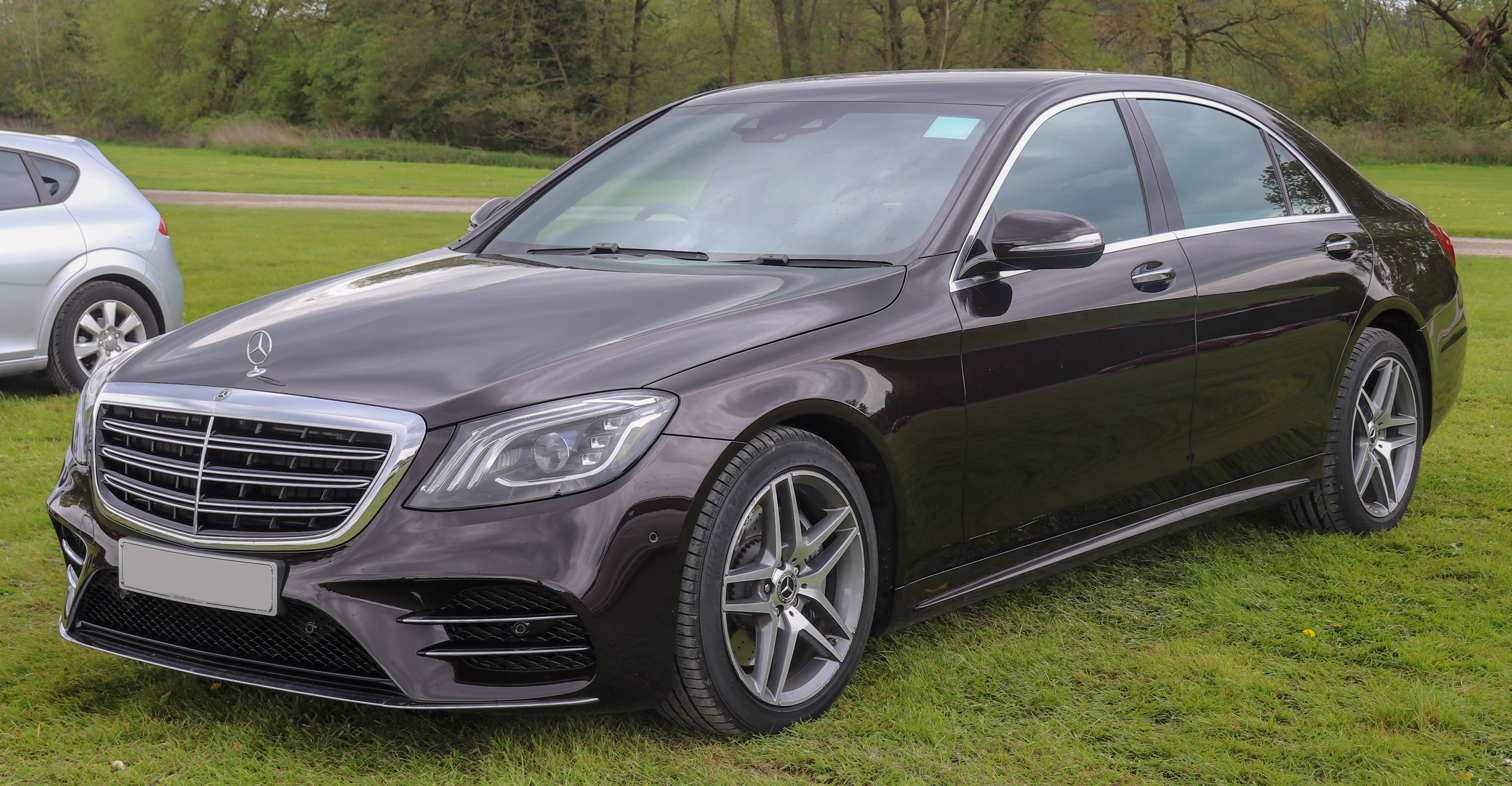
Mercedes-Benz S-Class

The largest size of a luxury car is known as a luxury saloon in the United Kingdom and a full-size luxury car in the United States. These cars are classified as F-segment cars in the European car classification.

Vehicles in this category are often the flagship models of luxury car brands.

Examples of luxury saloons:

- BMW 7 Series
- Lincoln Continental
- Lexus LS

== Sports / performance cars ==
Cars that prioritize handling or straight-line acceleration are called sports cars or performance cars. However the term "sports car" is also sometimes used specifically for lightweight two-seat cars. Sports/performance cars can either be built on unique platforms or upgraded versions of regular cars.

Common categories of sports/performance cars are:

- sports car
- sports sedan / sports saloon
- supercar
- hypercar
- hot hatch
- sport compact
- muscle car
- pony car
- grand tourer

The definitions for these categories are often blurred and a car may be a member of multiple categories.

=== Sports car ===
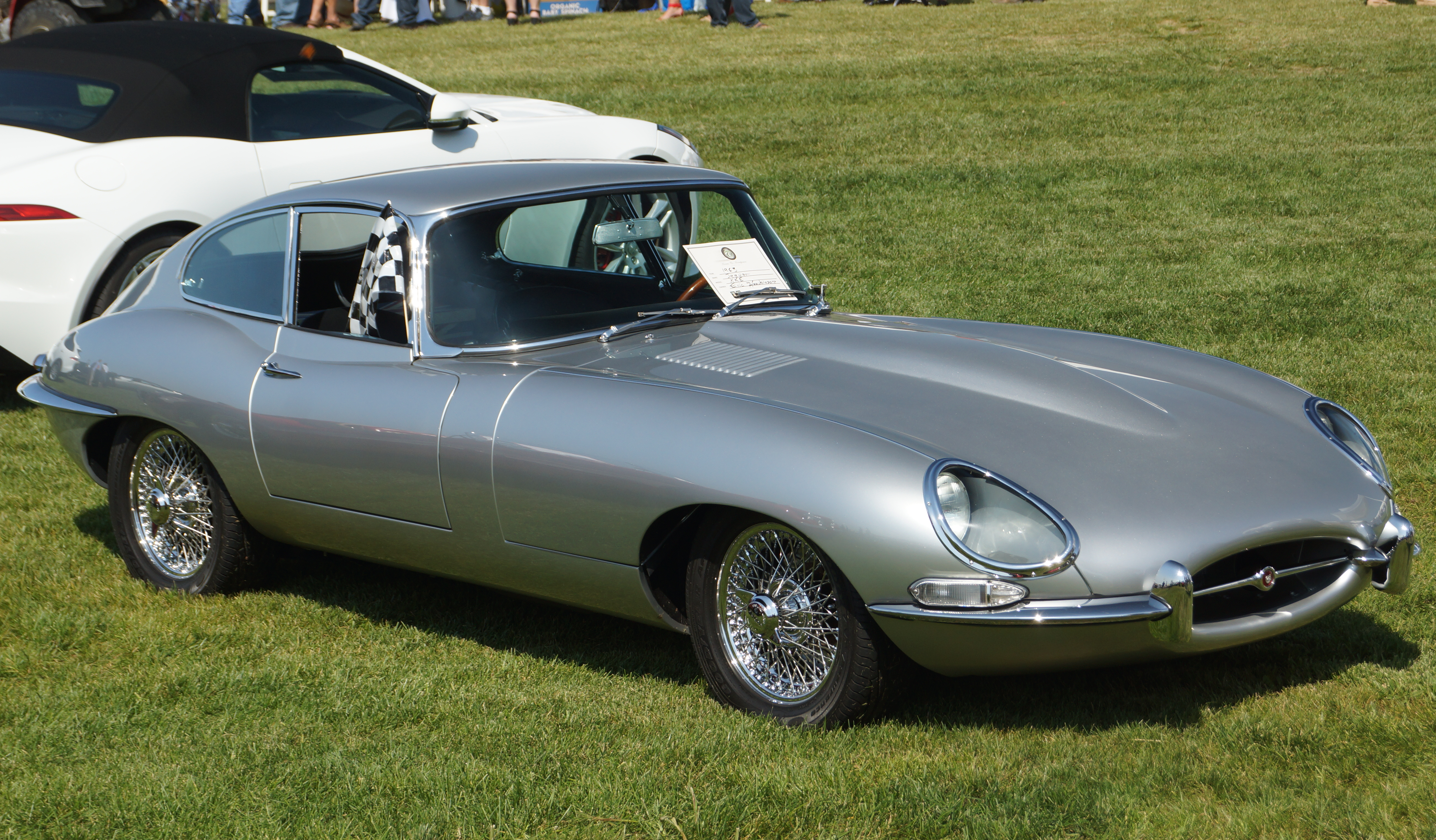
Jaguar E-Type

Sports cars are designed to emphasize handling, performance, or the thrill of driving. Sports cars originated in Europe in the early 1900s, with one of the first recorded usages of the term "sports car" being in The Times newspaper in the United Kingdom in 1919. Sports cars started to become popular during the 1920s. The term was originally used for two-seat roadsters (cars without fixed roofs). However, since the 1970s the term has also been used for cars with fixed roofs (which were previously considered grand tourers).

Examples of sports cars:

- Chevrolet Corvette
- Mazda MX-5
- Porsche 911

=== Sports sedan / sports saloon ===
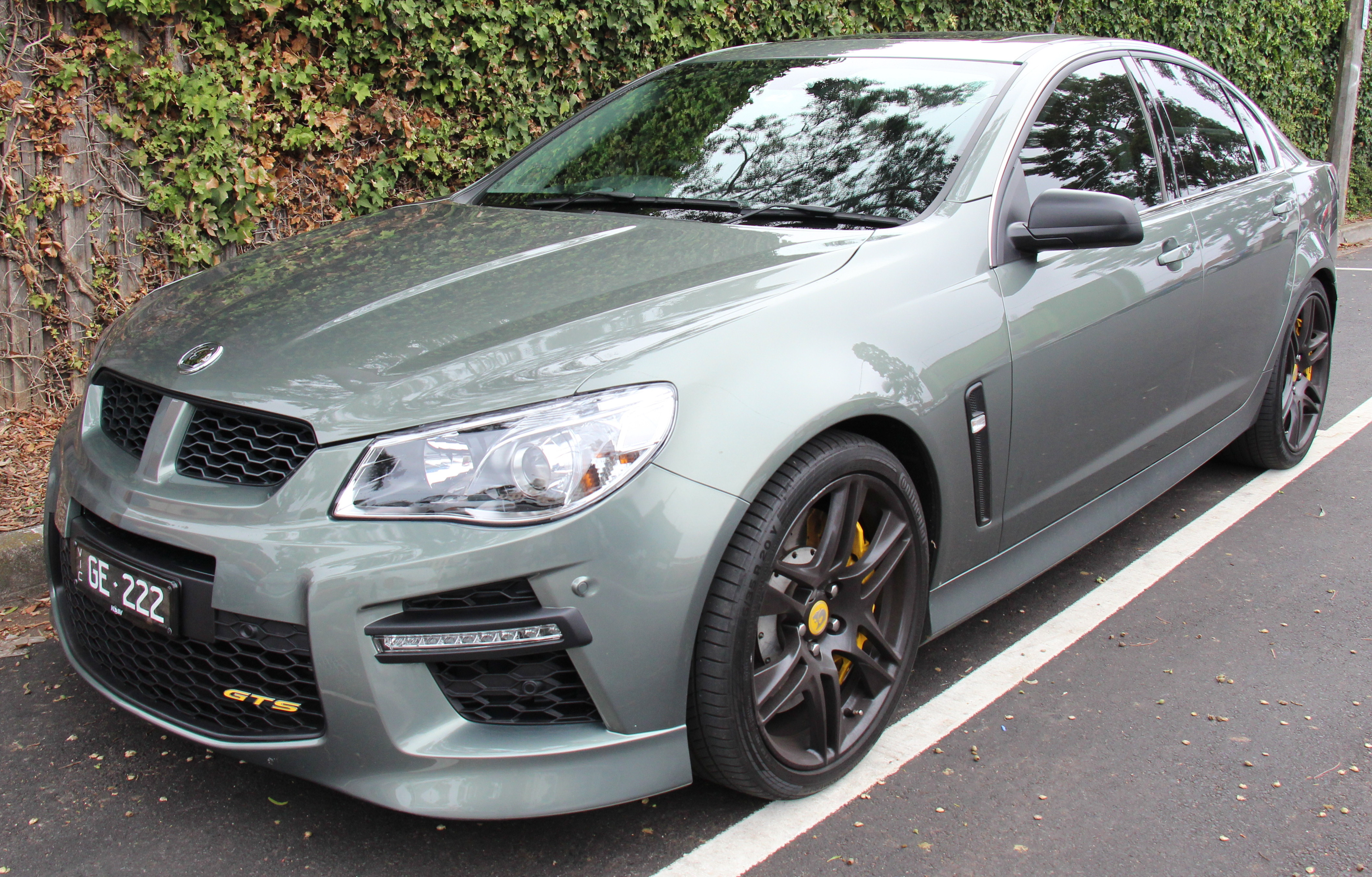
HSV GTS (Gen-F)

A sports sedan — also known as "sports saloon" — is a subjective term for a sedan/saloon car that is designed to have sporting performance or handling characteristics.

Examples of sports sedans:

- BMW M5
- Mazdaspeed6 / Mazda 6 MPS
- Dodge Charger

=== Supercar / hypercar ===
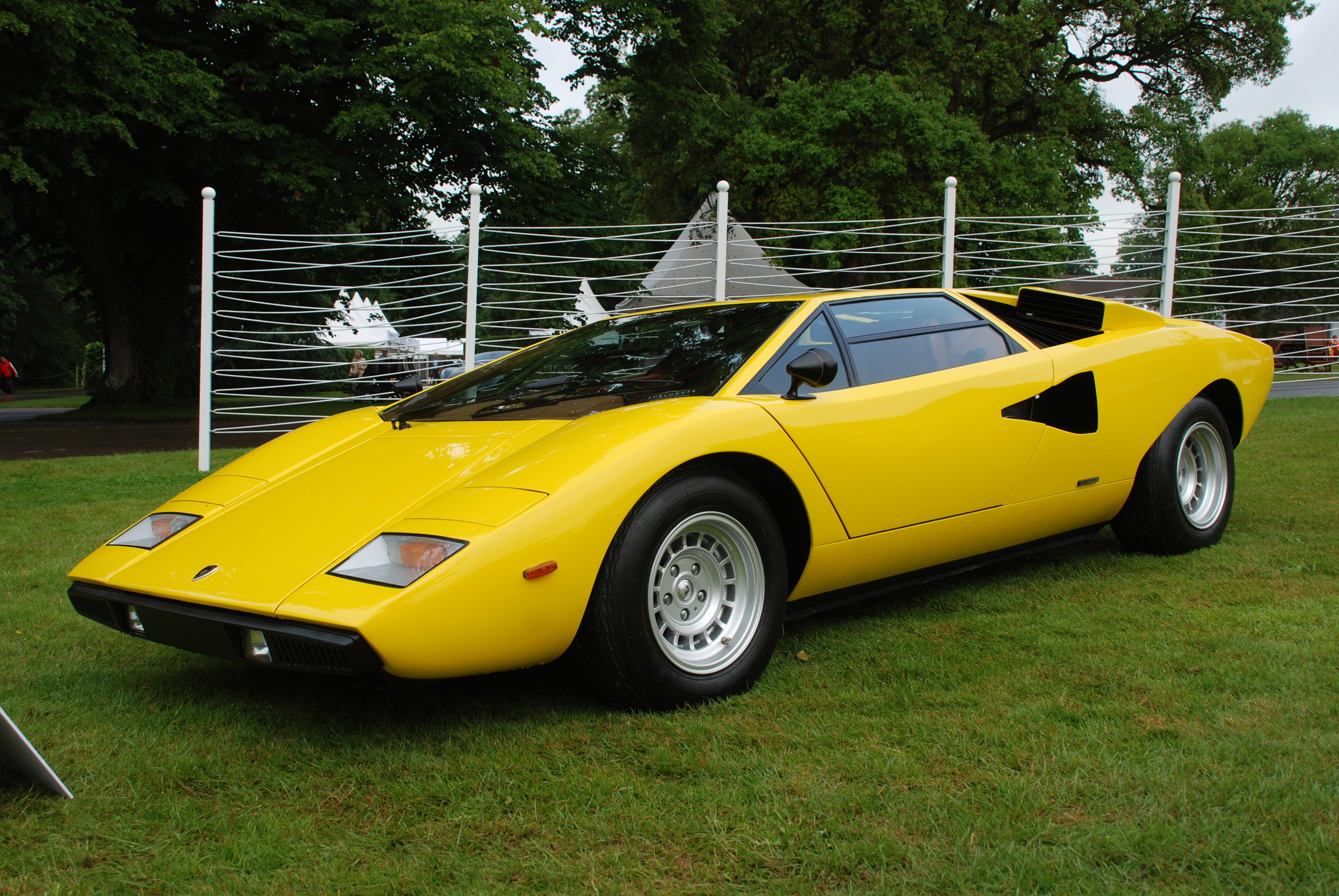
Lamborghini Countach

A supercar – also called an exotic car – is a loosely defined description of certain high-performance sportscars. Since the 1990s or 2000s, the term "hypercar" has come into use for the highest-performing supercars.

Examples of supercars:

- McLaren P1
- Koenigsegg Agera R
- Bugatti Veyron 16.4

== SUVs / off-road vehicles ==
Passenger vehicles with off-road capability or styling features are often categorized as either off-road vehicles, sports utility vehicles, or crossover SUVs. There are no commonly agreed boundaries between these categories, and usage of the terms varies between countries.

=== Off-road vehicle ===
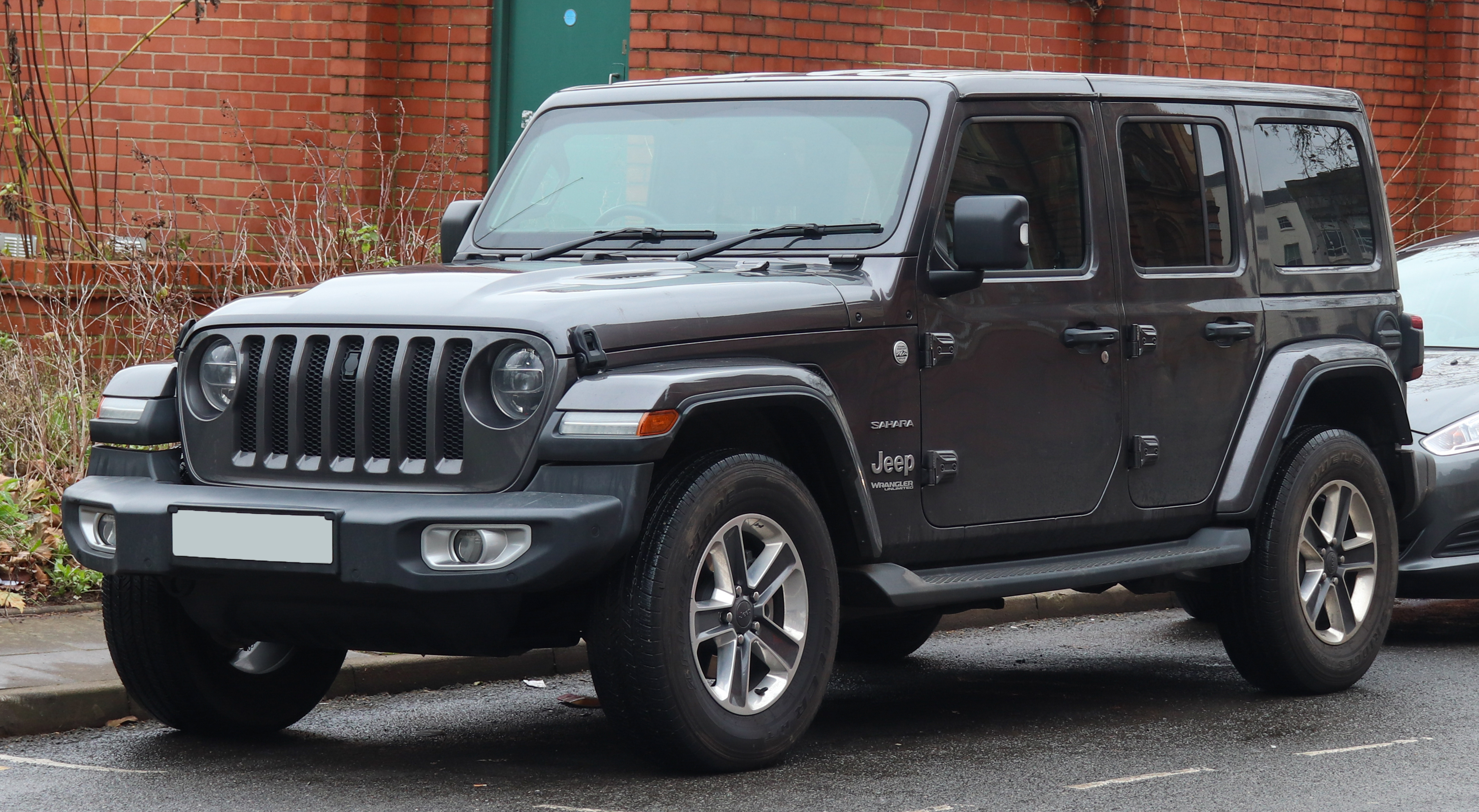
Jeep Wrangler (2018–present)

The earliest type of passenger vehicle is called an "off-roader", "four-by-four" or "four-wheel drive". Off-road vehicles are usually more focused on off-road capability than SUVs and crossover SUVs (often compromising their on-road ride quality or handling). Common features of off-road vehicles are four-wheel drive, high ground clearance, a body-on-frame (separate chassis) construction and low-range gearing.

Examples of off-road vehicles:

- Nissan Patrol
- Toyota Land Cruiser
- Suzuki Jimny

=== Sport utility vehicle ===
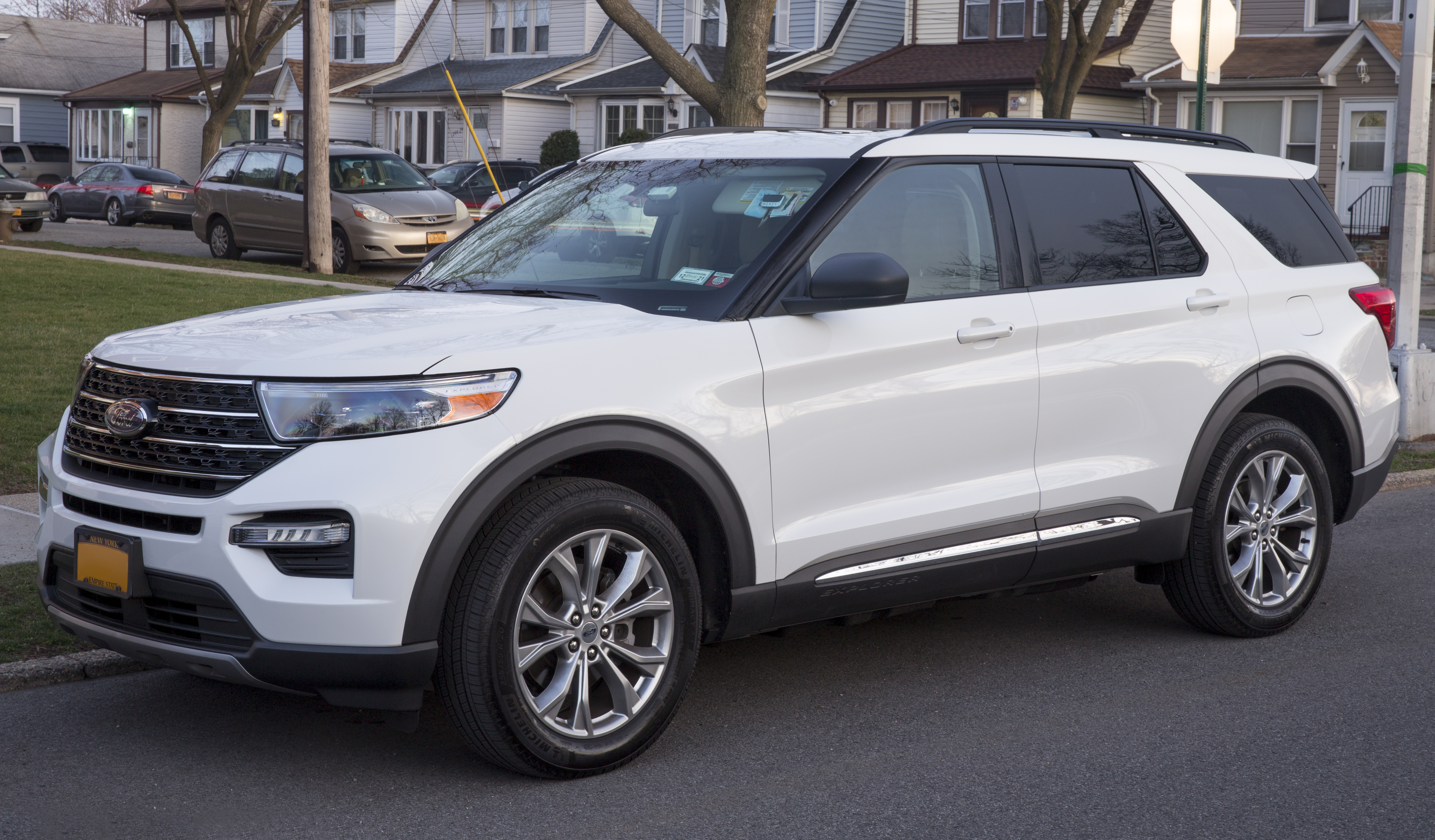
Ford Explorer (2020–present)

A sports utility vehicle (SUV) combines elements of road-going passenger vehicles with features from off-road vehicles, such as raised ground clearance and four-wheel drive.

There is no common definition of an SUV, and usage varies between countries. Some definitions claim that an SUV must be built on a light-truck chassis. However, a broader definition considers any vehicle with off-road design features as an SUV. In some countries — such as the United States — SUVs have been classified as "light trucks", resulting in more lenient regulations compared to passenger vehicles.

The predecessors to SUVs date back to military and low-volume models from the late 1930s, and the four-wheel drive station wagons / carryalls that began to be introduced in 1949. The 1984 Jeep Cherokee (XJ) is considered to be the first SUV in the modern style. Most SUVs produced today use unibody construction (as per passenger cars). However, in the past, many SUVs used body-on-frame construction.

Examples of SUVs:

- Chevrolet Tahoe
- Mercedes-Benz M-Class
- Mitsubishi Pajero

=== Crossover SUV ===
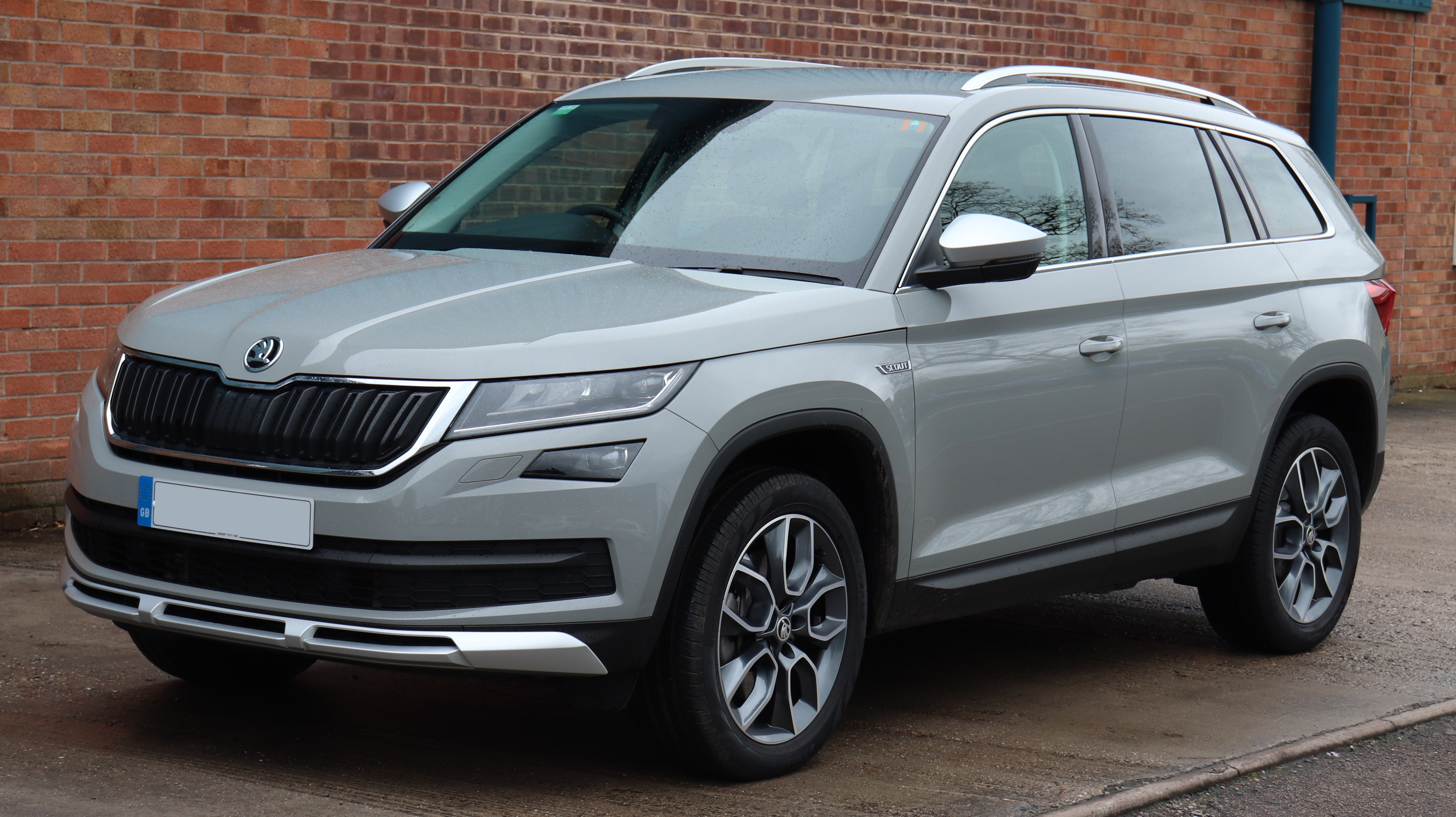
Skoda Kodiaq

A crossover SUV— also called a crossover or CUV— is a type of sports utility vehicle (SUV) that uses a unibody construction. Crossovers are often based on a platform shared with a passenger car, as a result, they typically have better comfort and fuel economy, but less off-road capability (many crossovers are sold without all-wheel drive) than truck-based SUVs, though more so than passenger four wheels.

There are various inconsistencies about whether vehicles are considered crossovers or SUVs, therefore the term SUV is often used as a catch-all for both crossovers and SUVs.

Examples of crossover SUVs:

- Nissan Qashqai
- Volkswagen Tiguan
- Mazda CX60

== Government classification methods ==
These classifications can be based on body style (e.g. sedan, coupe or hatchback), number of doors or seating capacity.

Government departments often create classification systems for taxation or regulating vehicle usage (e.g. vehicles that require a specific license or are restricted to certain roads). Some jurisdictions may determine vehicle tax based upon environmental principles, such as the user pays principle.

=== Australia ===
In Australia, the Federal Chamber of Automotive Industries publishes its classifications.

=== Canada ===
A similar set of classes is used by the Canadian EPA. The Canadian National Collision Database (NCDB) system defines "passenger car" as a unique class, but also identifies two other categories involving passenger vehicles—the "passenger van" and "light utility vehicle"—and these categories are inconsistently handled across the country with the boundaries between the vehicles increasingly blurred.

=== China ===
According to the "Terms and Definitions of Motor Vehicles, Trailers, and Combination Vehicles" (GB/T 3730.1) issued by China's State Administration for Market Regulation and Standardization Administration in 2021, there are regulations on the dimensions of three-box vehicles (sedans), two-box vehicles (hatchbacks and SUVs), and multi purpose vehicles (MPV/Van).

The classification of a three-box vehicle (sedan) is determined by its length, while the classification of a two-box car (hatchback and SUV) or MPV is determined by its wheelbase.

Passenger car size definition in China
Type	Segment	Chinese	English	Length
Three-box vehicles (sedans)	A00	微型	Micro	＜4000 mm
Three-box vehicles (sedans)	A0	小型	Subcompact	3700 mm≤L≤4400 mm
Three-box vehicles (sedans)	A	紧凑型	Compact	4200 mm≤L≤4800 mm
Three-box vehicles (sedans)	B	中型	Mid-size	4500 mm≤L≤5000 mm
Three-box vehicles (sedans)	C/D	大型	Full-size	L≥5000
Type	Segment	Chinese	English	Wheelbase
Two-box vehicles (hatchbacks and SUVs)	A00	微型	Micro	L＜2500 mm
Two-box vehicles (hatchbacks and SUVs)	A0	小型	Subcompact	2000 mm≤L≤2675 mm
Two-box vehicles (hatchbacks and SUVs)	A	紧凑型	Compact	2500mm ≤L≤2800 mm
Two-box vehicles (hatchbacks and SUVs)	B	中型	Mid-size	2700mm ≤L≤3000 mm
Two-box vehicles (hatchbacks and SUVs)	C/D	大型	Full-size	L≥3000 mm
Type	Segment	Chinese	English	Wheelbase
Multi purpose vehicles (MPV/Van)	A0	小型	Subcompact	L＜2700 mm
Multi purpose vehicles (MPV/Van)	A	紧凑型	Compact	2700mm ≤L≤2800 mm
Multi purpose vehicles (MPV/Van)	B	中型	Mid-size	2800mm ≤L≤3000 mm
Multi purpose vehicles (MPV/Van)	C	大型	Full-size	L≥3000 mm

=== United Kingdom ===
In the United Kingdom, a vehicle is taxed according to the vehicle's construction, engine, weight, type of fuel, and emissions, as well as the purpose for which it is used.

=== United States ===
In the United States, since 2010 the Insurance Institute for Highway Safety has used a formula it developed that takes into account a combination of both vehicle footprint (length times width) and weight.

US Highway Loss Data Institute classification	Definition
Regular two door	Two-door sedans and hatchbacks
Regular four door	Four-door sedans and hatchbacks
Station wagons	Four doors, a rear hatch, and four pillars
Minivans	Vans with sliding rear doors
Sports	Two-seaters and cars with significant high-performance features
Luxury	Relatively expensive cars that are not classified as sports (price in USD to curb weight in pounds more than 9.0 in 2010) (small cars over $27,000, midsize cars over $31,500, large cars over $36,000, etc.)

US Insurance Institute for Highway Safety | Highway Loss Data Institute 'Guide to car size groups' (includes minivans)
	Shadow (square footage of exterior length × width)				
Curb weight	70 to 80 sq ft (6.5–7.4 m^{2})	81 to 90 sq ft (7.5–8.4 m^{2})	91 to 100 sq ft (8.5–9.3 m^{2})	101 to 110 sq ft (9.4–10.2 m^{2})	>110 sq ft (10.2 m^{2})
2,001 to 2,500 lb (900–1,150 kg)	Mini	Small	Small	Small	Midsize
2,501 to 3,000 lb (1,150–1,350 kg)	Small	Small	Midsize	Midsize	Midsize
3,001 to 3,500 lb (1,350–1,600 kg)	Small	Midsize	Midsize	Large	Large
3,501 to 4,000 lb (1,600–1,800 kg)	Small	Midsize	Large	Large	Very large
>4,000 lb (1,800 kg)	Midsize	Midsize	Large	Very large	Very large

US IIHS|HLDI Guide to SUV size groups
	Curb weight
Mini	<=3,000 lb (1,350 kg) and shadow <80 sq ft (7.4 m^{2})
Small	3,001 to 3,750 lb (1,350–1,700 kg)
Midsize	3,751 to 4,750 lb (1,700–2,150 kg)
Large	4,751 to 5,750 lb (2,150–2,600 kg)
Very large	>5,750 lb (2,600 kg) or shadow >115 sq ft (10.7 m^{2})

The United States National Highway Traffic Safety Administration (NHTSA) separates vehicles into classes by the curb weight of the vehicle with standard equipment including the maximum capacity of fuel, oil, coolant, and air conditioning, if so equipped.

US NHTSA classification	Code	Curb weight
Passenger cars: mini	PC/Mi	1,500 to 1,999 lb (700–900 kg)
Passenger cars: light	PC/L	2,000 to 2,499 lb (900–1,150 kg)
Passenger cars: compact	PC/C	2,500 to 2,999 lb (1,150–1,350 kg)
Passenger cars: medium	PC/Me	3,000 to 3,499 lb (1,350–1,600 kg)
Passenger cars: heavy	PC/H	3,500 lb (1,600 kg) and over
Sport utility vehicles	SUV	–
Pickup trucks	PU	–
Vans	VAN	–

The United States Federal Highway Administration has developed a classification system used for automatically calculating road use tolls. There are two broad categories depending on whether the vehicle carries passengers or commodities. Vehicles that carry commodities are further subdivided by the number of axles and number of units, including both power and trailer units.

The United States Environmental Protection Agency (US EPA) has developed a classification system used to compare fuel economy among similar vehicles. Passenger vehicles are classified based on a vehicle's total interior passenger and cargo volumes. Trucks are classified based on their gross vehicle weight rating (GVWR). Heavy-duty vehicles are not included in the EPA scheme.

US EPA car class	Total passenger and cargo volume (cu. ft.)
Two-seaters	Any (designed to seat only two adults)
Minicompact	Less than 85 cu ft (2,400 L)
Subcompact	85 to 99 cu ft (2,400–2,800 L)
Compact	100 to 109 cu ft (2,850–3,100 L)
Mid-size	110 to 119 cu ft (3,100–3,350 L)
Large	120 cu ft (3,400 L) or more
Small station wagons	Less than 130 cu ft (3,700 L)
Mid-size station wagons	130 to 159 cu ft (3,700–4,500 L)
Large station wagons	160 cu ft (4,550 L) or more

Certain cities in the United States in the 1920s chose to exempt electric-powered vehicles because officials believed those vehicles did not cause "substantial wear upon the pavements".

== North American market segments ==
Several other segment descriptions, listed below, are used in North America. Cars from these segments may also be sold in other countries. However, the usage of the terms is mostly specific to North America.

=== Muscle car ===
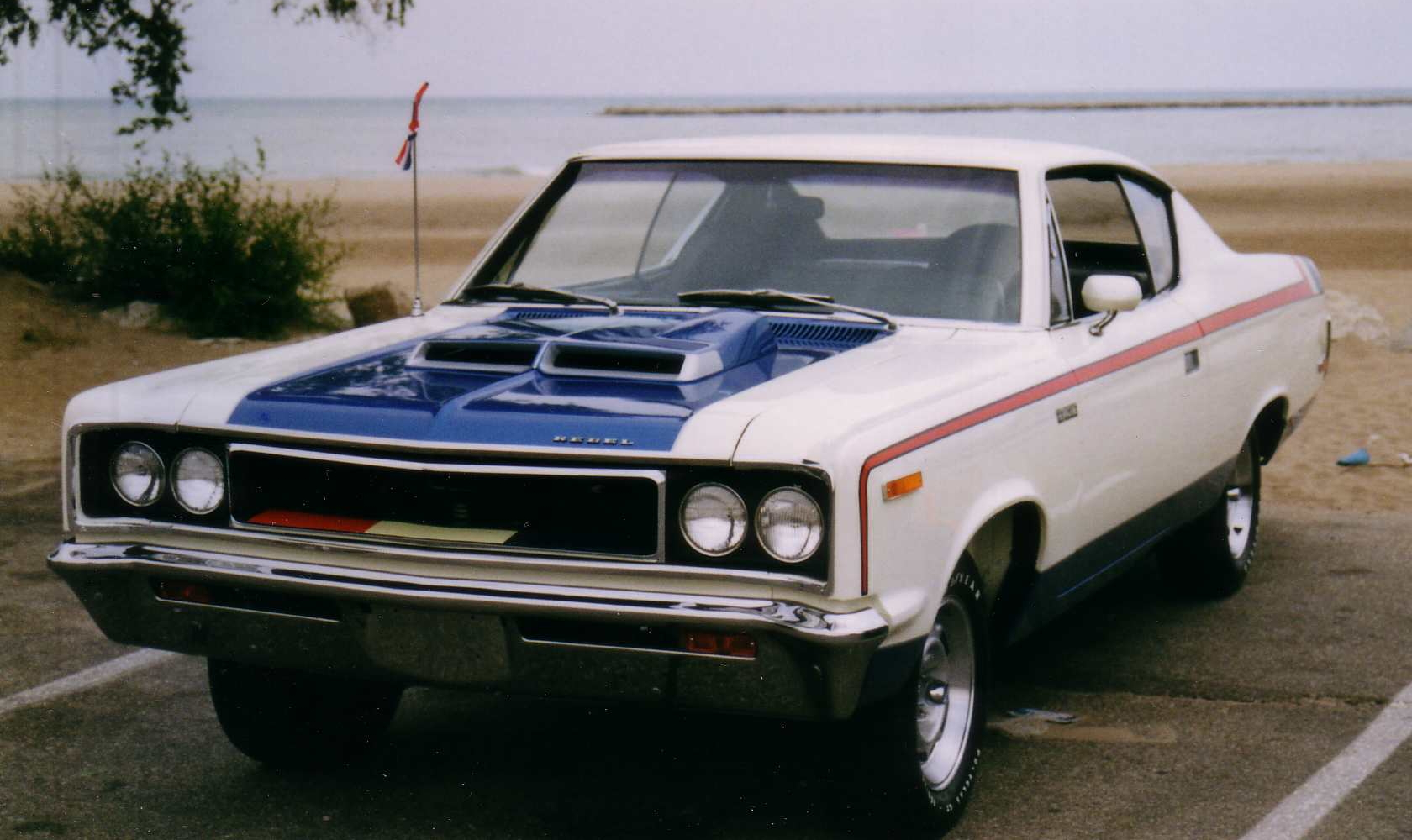
1970 AMC The Machine

Muscle car is an American term for high-performance cars, usually rear-wheel drive and fitted with a large and powerful V8 engine. The term originated for the 1960s and early 1970s special editions of mass-production cars which were designed for drag racing.

Examples of muscle cars:

- Ford Torino
- Plymouth Road Runner
- Pontiac GTO

=== Pony car ===
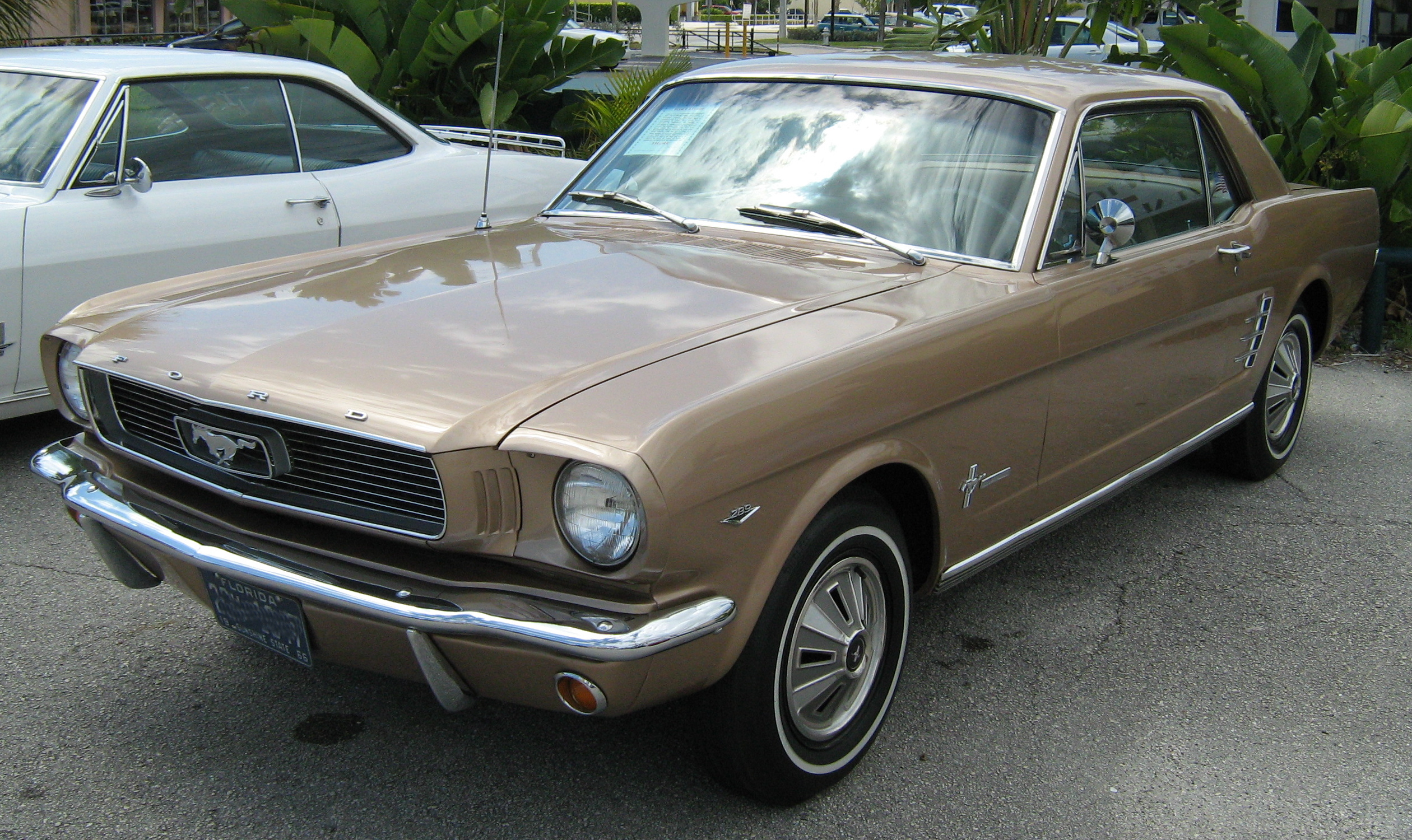
Ford Mustang (1965–1973)

Pony car is an American class of automobile launched and inspired by the Ford Mustang in 1964. It broke all post-World War II automobile sales records, "creating the 'pony car' craze soon adopted by competitors." The term describes an affordable, compact, highly styled car with a sporty or performance-oriented image.

Examples of pony cars:

- AMC Javelin
- Chevrolet Camaro
- Dodge Challenger

=== Personal luxury car ===
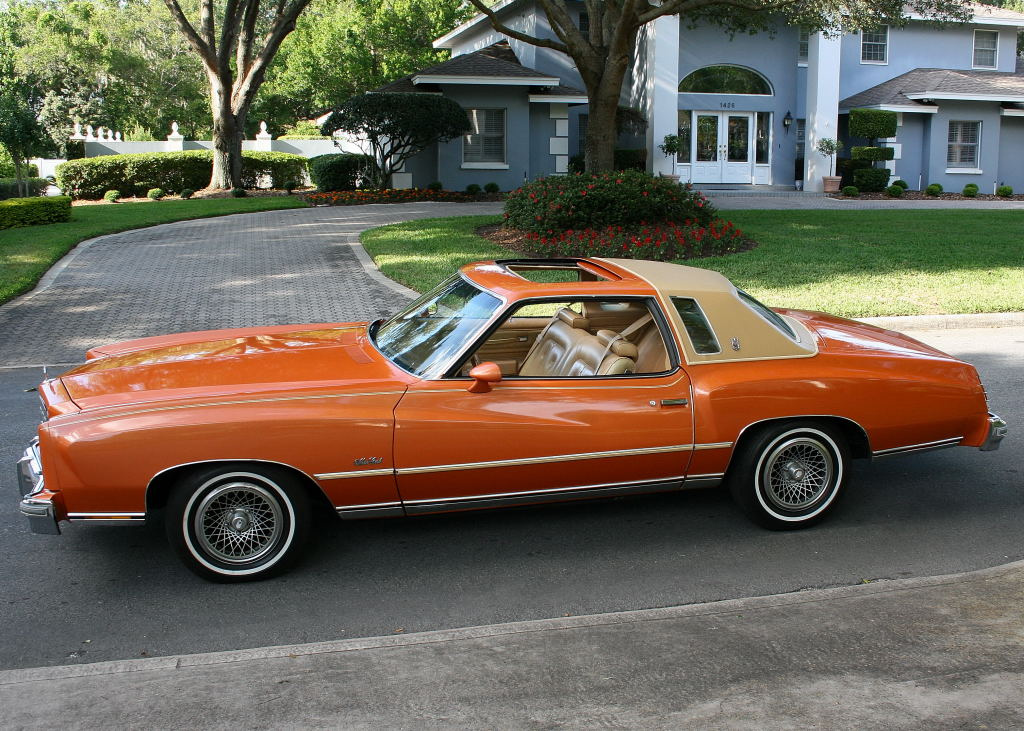
1977 Chevrolet Monte Carlo

A personal luxury car is a North American market segment for premium coupé or convertible produced from 1952–2007. These two-door cars prioritized comfort, styling, and a high level of interior features. Not prioritizing maximum interior space, interior volumes are equivalent size to mid-size cars and are part of the D-segment in the European car classification, and exterior dimensions can exceed F-segment.

Examples of personal luxury cars:

- Ford Thunderbird
- Cadillac Eldorado
- Chrysler Cordoba

=== Sport compact ===
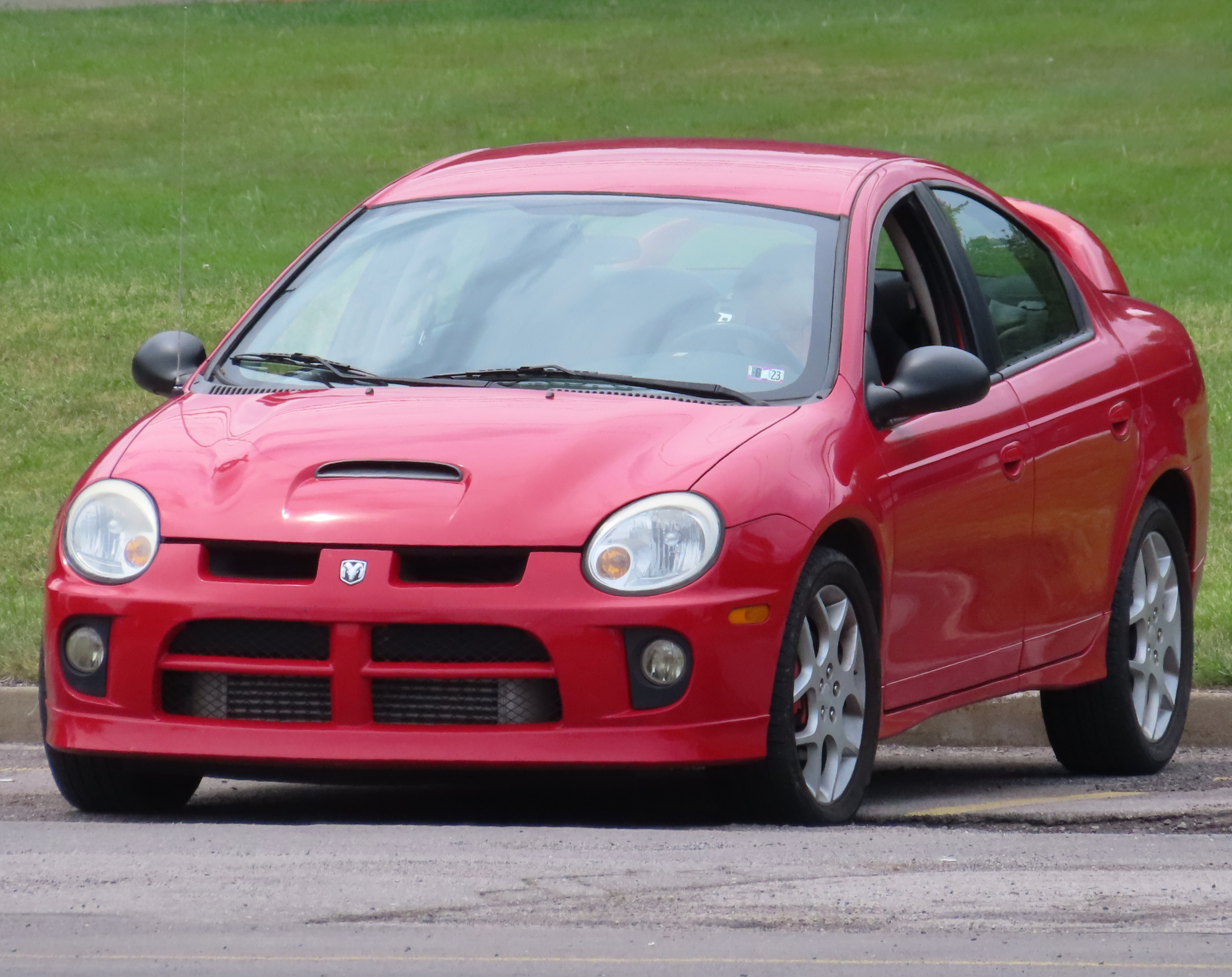
Dodge Neon SRT-4

A sporting version of an affordable compact car or a subcompact car. There is no precise definition and the description is applied for marketing purposes to a wide variety of models.

Cars began to be marketed as sport compacts in the mid-1980s when it was used for option packages on American-built coupes. Since then, it has also been used for standalone sports car models and cars imported from Europe and Asia.

The European equivalent is a hot hatch. However, sport compacts are not restricted to just hatchback body styles.

Examples of sport compact cars:

- Chevrolet Cavalier Z24
- Ford Probe
- Honda Civic Si

== European market segments ==
Several other segment descriptions, listed below, are used in Europe. Cars from these segments may also be sold in other countries. However, the usage of the terms is mostly specific to Europe.

=== Grand tourer ===
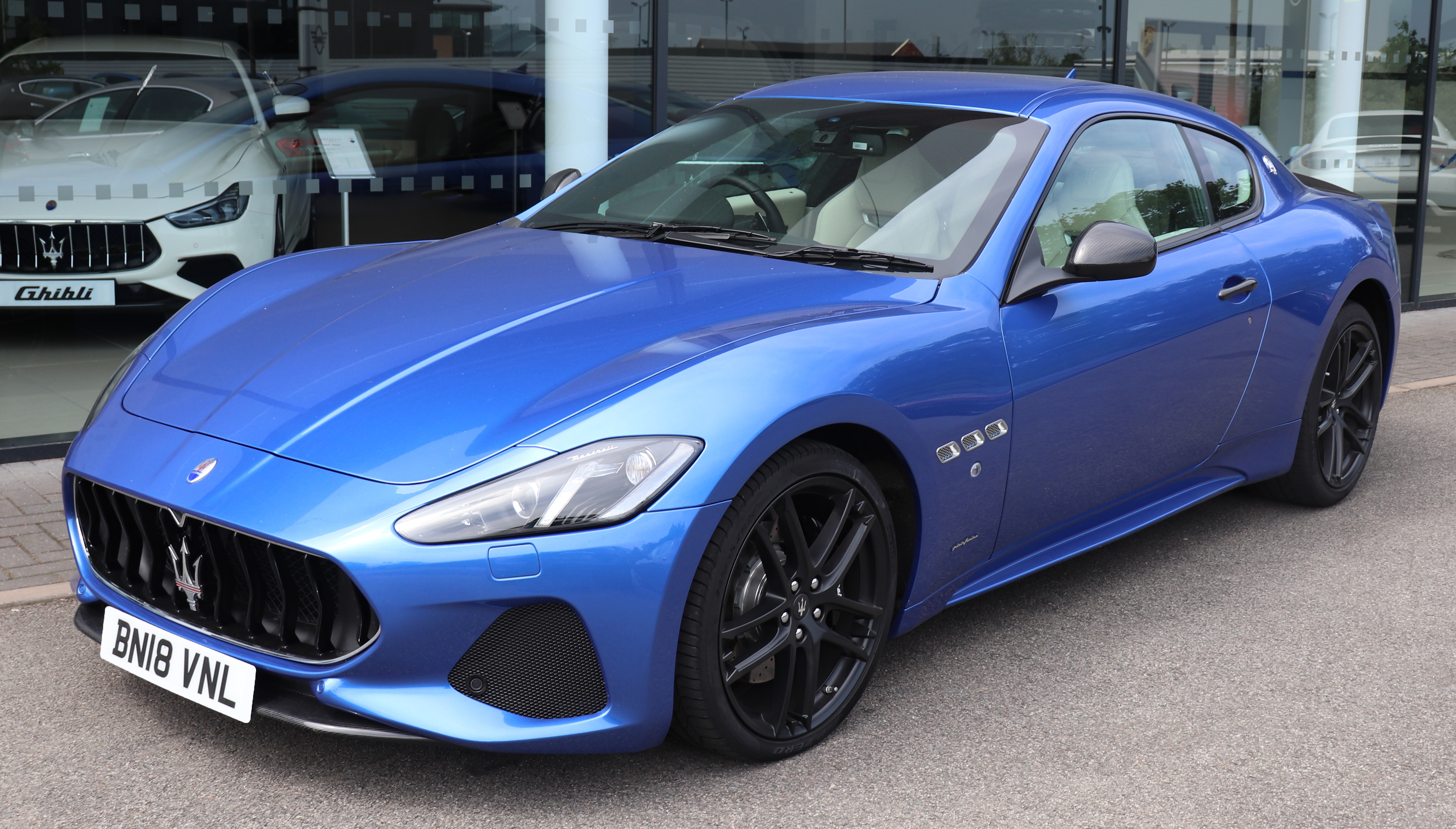
Maserati GranTurismo

A grand tourer (GT) is a car that is designed for high-speed and long-distance driving, due to a combination of performance and luxury attributes. The most common format is a front-engine, rear-wheel-drive two-door coupé with either a two-seat or a 2+2 arrangement.

The term derives from the Italian language phrase gran turismo which became popular in the English language from the 1950s, evolving from fast touring cars and streamlined closed sports cars during the 1930s.

Examples of grand tourers:

- Aston Martin Vanquish
- Lexus SC300/400
- Ferrari FF

=== Hot hatch ===
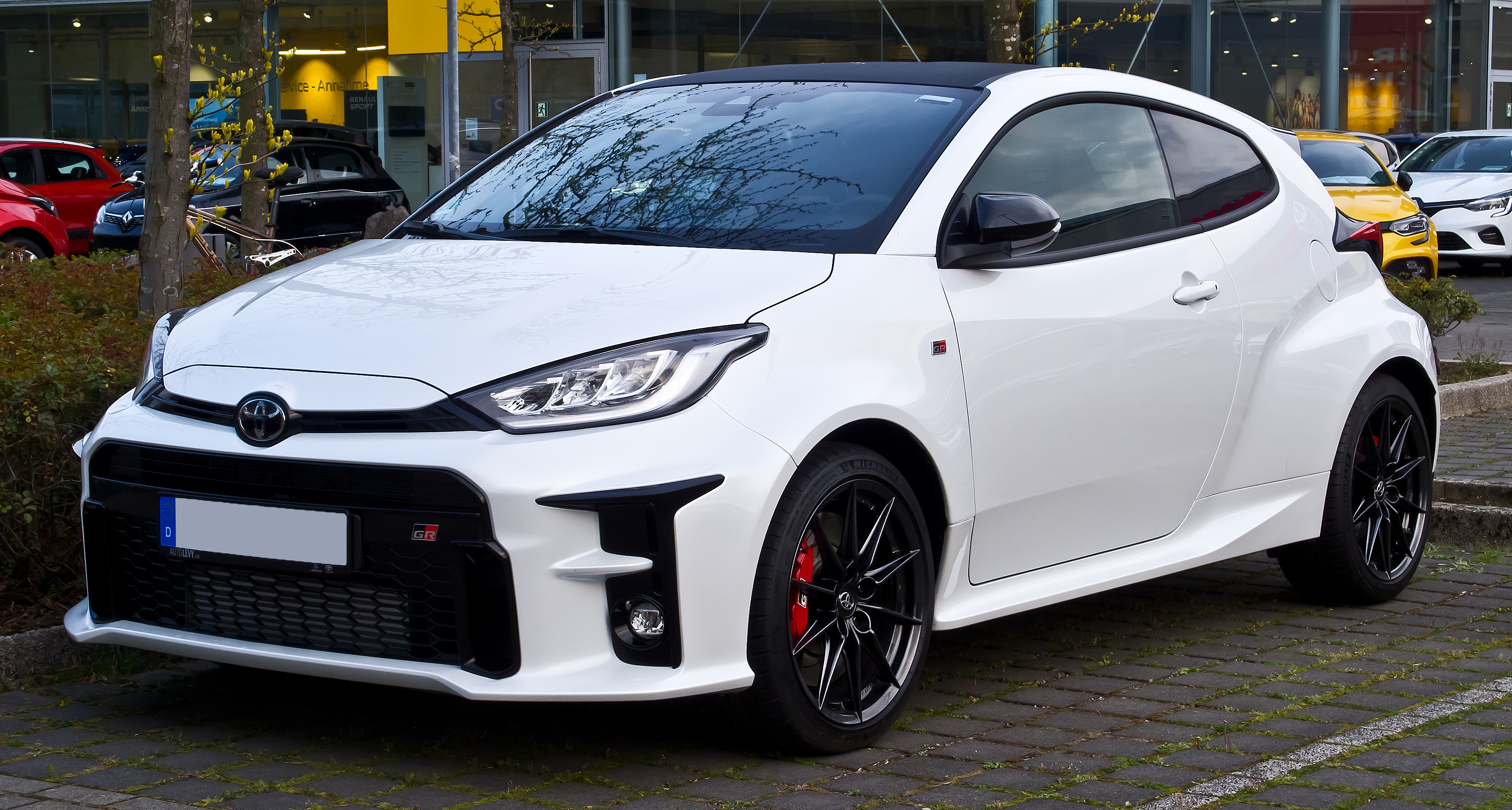
Toyota GR Yaris

Hot hatch (shortened from hot hatchback) is a high-performance version of a mass-produced hatchback car.

The term originated in the mid-1980s. However, factory high-performance versions of hatchbacks have been produced since the 1970s.

Front-mounted petrol engines, together with front-wheel drive, are the most common powertrain layout. However, all-wheel drive has become more commonly used since around 2010. Most hot hatches are manufactured in Europe or Asia.

Examples of hot hatches:

- Volkswagen Golf GTi
- Peugeot 205 GTi
- Honda Civic Type R

== See also ==
- ACRISS Car Classification Code
- Car body style
- Commercial vehicle
- Three-wheeler
- Truck classification
- Vehicle category
- Vehicle size class
