= Central Financial Commission =

Body of the Central Committee of the Chinese Communist Party

- 中国共产党中央委员会金融委员会
- Emblem of the Chinese Communist Party

Agency overview
- Formed: March 2023; 3 years ago
- Type: Commission directly reporting to the Central Committee
- Jurisdiction: Chinese Communist Party
- Headquarters: Beijing Financial Street
- Agency executives: Li Qiang, Leader; He Lifeng, Office Director; Wang Jiang, Office Deputy Director
- Parent agency: Central Committee of the Chinese Communist Party
- Child agency: Office of the Central Financial Commission

Central Financial Commission
- Simplified Chinese: 中央金融委员会
Transcriptions
Standard Mandarin
- Hanyu Pinyin: Zhōngyāng Jīnróng Wěiyuánhuì

The Central Financial Commission (CFC) is a commission of the Central Committee of the Chinese Communist Party (CCP) that supervises and manage the Chinese financial sector. The commission serves as the de facto watchdog, planner and decision maker for China’s $61tn financial sector.

== History ==
The CFC was established in 2023 under CCP general secretary Xi Jinping as part of the plan on reforming Party and state institutions, together with the Central Financial Work Commission. According to Chinese state media, the new body would strengthen the CCP's "centralized and unified leadership over financial work". The CFC oversaw the dissolution of the Financial Stability and Development Committee (FSDC), a State Council body established in 2017, with FSDC's office being absorbed into the CFC.

The CFC began operations in late September. The CFC Office has drawn personnel from other financial institutions such as the People’s Bank of China, the Ministry of Finance, and the National Development and Reform Commission.

== Functions ==
The CFC's role is to broadly oversee the country's financial system, enhancing CCP control over the sector. It oversees financial stability, funding for the real economy and the international use of the renminbi. It also has the mandate to manage financial planning and take action against systemic risks.

The CFC includes an Office that handles its day-to-day operations. The General Office is located at the Beijing Financial Street.

== Composition ==
=== 20th Central Committee ===
- Leader
  - Li Qiang (2023–)
- Deputy Leader(s)
  - To be announced
- Members
  - To be announced
- Director of the Office of the Commission
  - He Lifeng (2023–)
- Deputy Director(s) of the Office of the Commission
  - Wang Jiang (2023–, executive deputy director)
  - Xia Xiande (2023–, deputy director)

== See also ==
- List of financial supervisory authorities by country
