= Luo Wen (politician) =

Chinese executive and politician (born 1964)

- 罗文
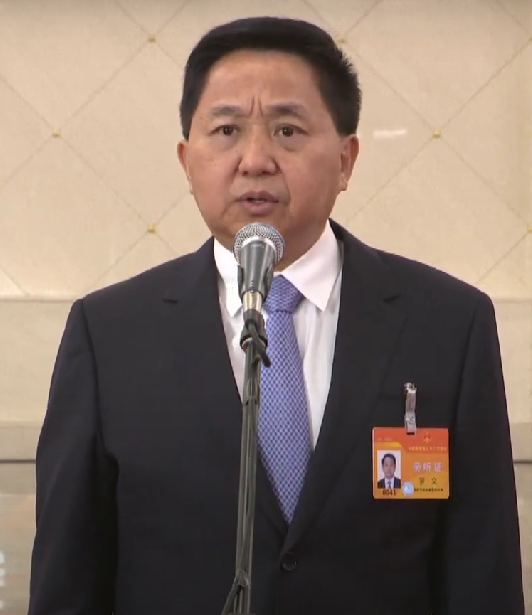
- Luo in 2024

Party Secretary of Hebei
- Incumbent
- Assumed office 31 July 2026
- Deputy: Zhao Chenxin (Acting Governor); Chang Bin
- Preceded by: Ni Yuefeng

Director of the State Administration for Market Regulation
- In office 8 July 2022 – 10 August 2026
- Premier: Li Keqiang; Li Qiang
- Preceded by: Zhang Gong
- Succeeded by: Liu Guiping

Personal details
- Born: December 1964 (age 61) Anren County, Hunan, China
- Party: Chinese Communist Party (1975-)
- Education: Wuhan University; Beijing Jiaotong University

Chinese name
- Simplified Chinese: 罗文
- Traditional Chinese: 羅文
Transcriptions
Standard Mandarin
- Hanyu Pinyin: Luó Wén

Luo Wen (Chinese: 罗文; born December 1964) is a Chinese executive and politician who is the current party secretary of Hebei, in office since July 2026.

He is a representative of the 20th National Congress of the Chinese Communist Party and a member of the 20th Central Committee of the Chinese Communist Party.

== Biography ==
Luo was born in Anren County, Hunan, in December 1964. In 1981, he entered Wuhan University, where he majored in philosophy. He also received his master's degree and doctor's degree from Beijing Jiaotong University in 2005 and 2014, respectively.

After graduating in 1985, he taught and worked at the Electronic Industry Management Cadre College. He worked in the Computer and Microelectronics Development Research Center, Ministry of Electronic Industry between November 1997 and February 2000.

In 2000, Luo became executive deputy general manager of the CCID Consulting Company Limited, rising to general manager in 2003. He served as vice president of the China Center for Information Industry Development in March 2003, and six years later promoted to the president position. In April 2009, he rose to become chairman of the CCID Consulting Company Limited.

Luo was director of the Planning Department of the Ministry of Industry and Information Technology in November 2015 and subsequently vice minister in July 2017.

In January 2019, Luo was appointed deputy director of the National Development and Reform Commission, but having held the position for only a year.

In March 2020, Luo was transferred from his job in the central government to southwest China's Sichuan province. He was appointed executive vice governor and was admitted to member of the Standing Committee of the CCP Sichuan Provincial Committee, the province's top authority. In May 2022, he concurrently served as deputy party secretary of Sichuan.

Luo was recalled to the central government and chosen as party branch secretary of the State Administration for Market Regulation in June 2022, in addition to serving as director since July 2022.

On 31 July 2026, Luo was transferred to local government again, and appointed as the party secretary of Hebei.

Government offices
Preceded by Liu Liehong	President of the China Center for Information Industry Development; 2009–2015	Succeeded by Lu Shan
Preceded by Xiao Hua (肖华)	Director of the Planning Department of the Ministry of Industry and Information Technology; 2015–2017	Succeeded by Gao Dongsheng
Preceded by Wang Ning	Executive Vice Governor of Sichuan; 2020–2022	Succeeded by Li Yunze
Preceded by Zhang Gong	Director of the State Administration for Market Regulation; 2022–2026	Succeeded by Liu Guiping
Party political offices
Preceded by Deng Xiaogang	Specifically-designated Deputy Communist Party Secretary of Sichuan; 2022–2022	Succeeded by Shi Xiaolin
Preceded by Ni Yuefeng	Party Secretary of Hebei; 2026–	Incumbent
