= Central Financial Work Commission =

Chinese Communist Party financial oversight body

- 中国共产党中央委员会金融工作委员会
- Emblem of the Chinese Communist Party

Agency overview
- Formed: 2023; 3 years ago
- Type: Commission directly reporting to the Central Committee
- Jurisdiction: Chinese Communist Party
- Headquarters: Beijing
- Agency executives: He Lifeng, Secretary; Wang Jiang, Executive Deputy Secretary; Qin Bin, Deputy Secretary
- Parent agency: Central Committee of the Chinese Communist Party

Central Financial Work Commission
- Simplified Chinese: 中央金融工作委员会
- Traditional Chinese: 中央金融工作委員會
Transcriptions
Standard Mandarin
- Hanyu Pinyin: Zhōngyāng Jīnróng Gōngzuò Wěiyuánhuì

The Central Financial Work Commission (CFWC) is a commission of the Central Committee of the Chinese Communist Party (CCP) that supervises the ideological and political role of the CCP in the Chinese financial system.

== History ==
CFWC was first created in 1998 to supervise the financial system on behalf of the CCP and to prevent deviations on the part of CCP-appointed managers. It was proposed by the staff of the Central Finance and Economics Leading Group (CFELG) and pursued by Zhu Rongji with the support of Jiang Zemin and Li Peng. The CFCW had political supervision and personnel authority over the People's Bank of China and state financial regulatory bodies, as well as over China's most important national firms.

The Central Financial Work Commission consisted of several core departments: the Organization Department, the Financial Discipline Inspection Work Commission and the Department of Supervisory Board Work. It had about 200 officials and was ranked above ministerial level. Its operations were supervised by Executive Deputy Secretary Yan Haiwang, and it regularly reported directly to its head, CFCW Secretary Wen Jiabao, who concurrently served as a member of the Politburo and as vice-premier in charge of work on finance. Wen was CFCW Secretary from 1998 until the organization's demise in 2002. Some have interpreted this to be evidence of the fact that Wen was being groomed and tested for the position of premier, since he clearly lacked the experience to run effective financial policy. The CFCW facilitated comprehensive personnel reshuffles during its existence, particularly in 1999 and 2000.

The CFWC was abolished at the 16th Party Congress in late 2002, and most of its functions were transferred to state regulatory bodies. Sebastian Heilmann argues that the CFCW was created as part of a strategy to stop the breakdown of the hierarchies in the Chinese financial industry and to restore central policy decisiveness in the aftermath of the Asian financial crisis.

=== Re-establishment ===
It was reestablished in 2023 under CCP general secretary Xi Jinping as part of the plan on reforming Party and state institutions, together with the Central Financial Commission. It was reported that it will supervise the ideological and political role of the CCP in the financial sector. In November 2023, He Lifeng was appointed as the secretary of the commission.

== See also ==
- List of financial supervisory authorities by country
