= Liu Guiping =

Chinese banker and politician

- 刘桂平

Director of the State Administration for Market Regulation
- Incumbent
- Assumed office September 2026
- Preceded by: Luo Wen

Deputy Secretary of the Tianjin Municipal Committee of the Chinese Communist Party
- In office May 2025 – August 2026
- Preceded by: Chen Fukuan

President of China Construction Bank
- In office March 2019 – November 2020
- Preceded by: Wang Zuji
- Succeeded by: Wang Jiang

Personal details
- Born: May 1966 (age 60) Hengnan County, Hunan, China
- Party: Chinese Communist Party
- Education: Xiangtan University; Jinan University

Chinese name
- Simplified Chinese: 刘桂平
- Traditional Chinese: 劉桂平
Transcriptions
Standard Mandarin
- Hanyu Pinyin: Liú Guìpíng

Liu Guiping (Chinese: 刘桂平; born May 1966) is a Chinese banker and politician who is the current director of the State Administration for Market Regulation. He is a member of the Chinese Communist Party and an alternate member of the 20th Central Committee of the Chinese Communist Party.

== Biography ==
Liu was born in Hengnan County, Hunan, in May 1966. In 1982, he entered Xiangtan University, majoring in political economics. After graduation, he was accepted to Jinan University, graduating with a master's degree in political economics.

Liu joined the Chinese Communist Party (CCP) in May 1986. Beginning in May 1989, he served in several posts in the Agricultural Bank of China, including president of Fujian Branch, president of Shanghai Branch, and head of Retail Banking Business Department. In May 2014, he became deputy general manager of China Investment Corporation, but having held the position for only two years. In June 2016, he was appointed vice mayor of Chongqing.

He became president of China Construction Bank in May 2019, and served until November 2020, when he was made vice president of the People's Bank of China.

In April 2022, Liu was appointed a member of the Standing Committee of the Chinese Communist Party Tianjin Municipal Committee and executive vice mayor of Tianjin. In January 2024, he additionally became director of the Tianjin Municipal Financial Affairs Office and secretary of the Party Working Committee of the Tianjin Municipal Financial Working Committee.

In May 2025, Liu was appointed deputy secretary of the Tianjin Municipal Committee of the Chinese Communist Party. From June 2025, he also served as secretary of the Tianjin Municipal Education Working Committee and, concurrently, president of the Party School of the Tianjin Municipal Committee and the Tianjin Academy of Governance. In July 2026, he ceased to serve as secretary of the Tianjin Municipal Education Working Committee while continuing as deputy secretary of the Tianjin Municipal Committee and president of the Party School of the Tianjin Municipal Committee.

On August 28, 2026, the Organization Department of the Central Committee of the Chinese Communist Party announced that Liu had been appointed Party Secretary of the State Administration for Market Regulation. He succeeded Luo Wen, who had been appointed Secretary of the Chinese Communist Party Hebei Provincial Committee. He was appointed as the director on September 2.

Government offices
Preceded by Luo Wen	Director of the State Administration for Market Regulation; 2026–	Incumbent
Party political offices
Preceded by Chen Fukuan	Deputy Secretary of the Tianjin Municipal Committee of the Chinese Communist Party; 2025–2026	Vacant
Business positions
Preceded by Wang Zuji	President of China Construction Bank; 2019–2020	Succeeded by Wang Jiang
