= State Administration for Market Regulation =

Chinese government agency

- 国家市场监督管理总局
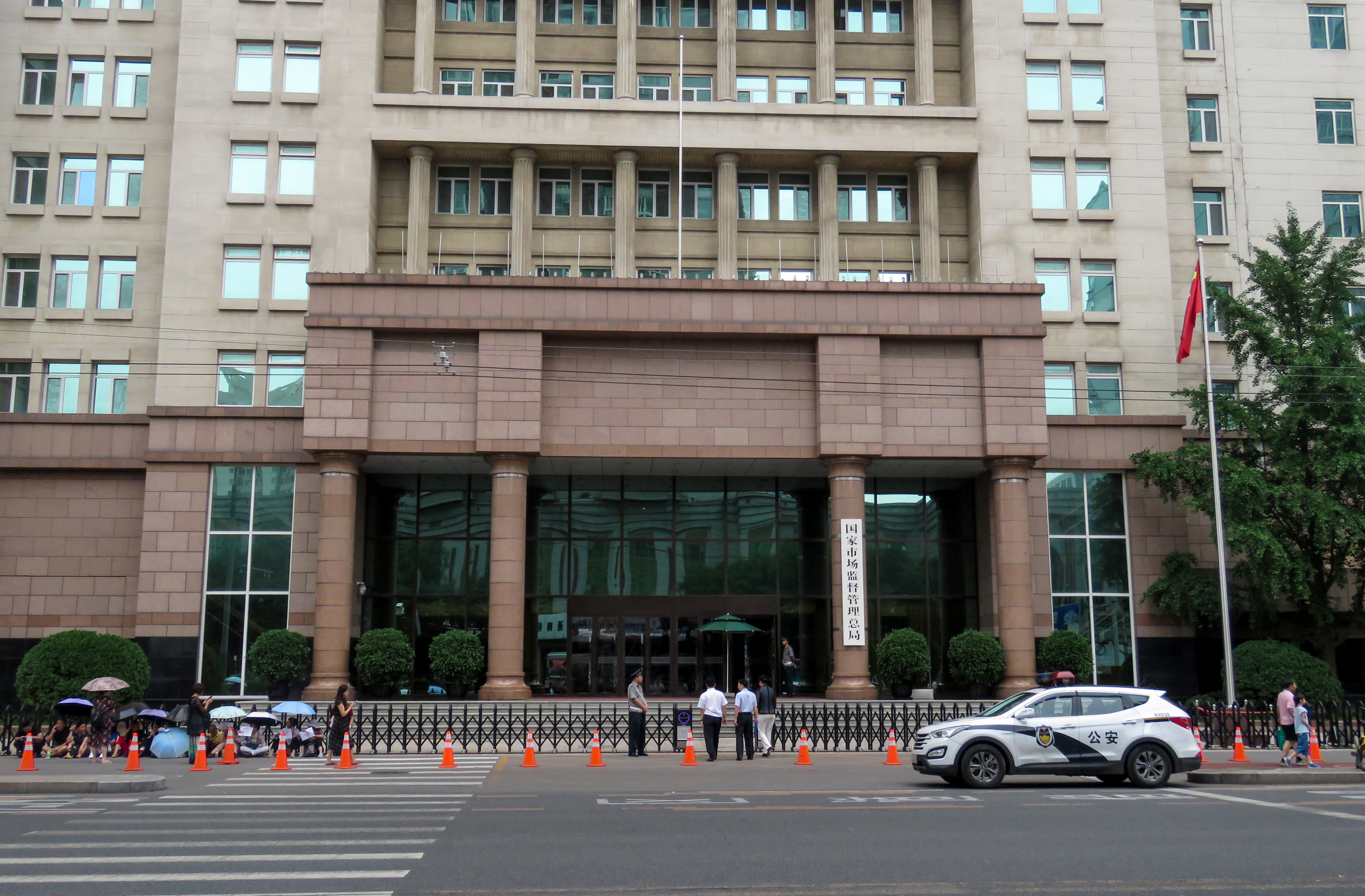
- Headquarters Entrance (Beijing)

Agency overview
- Formed: 2018
- Preceding agencies: General Administration of Quality Supervision, Inspection and Quarantine; China Food and Drug Administration; State Administration for Industry and Commerce
- Jurisdiction: China
- Headquarters: 8 East Sanlihe Rd, Xicheng District, Beijing
- Agency executive: Liu Guiping, Director
- Parent agency: State Council
- Website: www.samr.gov.cn

State Administration for Market Regulation
- Simplified Chinese: 国家市场监督管理总局
- Traditional Chinese: 國家市場監督管理總局
Transcriptions
Standard Mandarin
- Hanyu Pinyin: Guójiā Shìchǎng Jiāndū Guǎnlǐ Zǒngjú

The State Administration for Market Regulation (SAMR; 国家市场监督管理总局; Guójiā Shìchǎng Jiāndū Guǎnlǐ Zǒngjú) is a ministerial-level non-cabinet agency directly under the State Council of the People's Republic of China and is responsible for market supervision and management. The SAMR was established in 2018 and it is China's primary antitrust regulator.

== History ==
The Administration was created as part of the deepening the reform of the Party and state institutions, and merged or abolished a number of previous agencies, such as the State Intellectual Property Office. SAMR was created under the banner of the Central Comprehensively Deepening Reforms Commission under Xi Jinping, current General Secretary of the Chinese Communist Party.

The Administration consolidates in one ministry the market regulation functions previously shared by three separate agencies, the General Administration of Quality Supervision, Inspection and Quarantine (AQSIQ), the China Food and Drug Administration (CFDA), and the State Administration of Industry and Commerce (SAIC).

In 2018, SAMR began a probe into Pinduoduo following the company being criticized extensively in domestic media for its selling of shanzhai and counterfeit products.

In November 2020, SAMR issued antitrust guidelines which addressed platform economy company issues. These guidelines came into effect in February 2021. Among other provisions, the guidelines state that variable interest entity structures will no longer be exempt from merger review and that SAMR may investigate acquisitions of emerging platforms even when the parties turnover does not meet notification thresholds.

In March 2021, Xi Jinping stated that China would strengthen anti-trust enforcement to ensure healthy and sustainable development of the platform economy. In November 2021, SAMR's antitrust bureau was upgraded to vice ministerial status following the appointment of Gan Lin as the bureau's new chief.

== Function ==
SAMR is China's primary antitrust regulator, although its authority also has some overlap with the National Development and Reform Commission and the Ministry of Industry and Information Technology. It also has regulatory functions involving data regulation and labor issues. The E-Commerce Law is part of SAMR's broader mandate, and therefore it is a significant regulator in the area of e-commerce in China.

As of at least 2024, the SAMR provincial agencies for Jiangsu, Zhejiang, and Shanghai have been particularly active in antitrust enforcement.

SAMR's antitrust enforcement approach has been more stringent than pre-SAMR enforcement, and has remained more stringent as of at least early 2024.

== List of directors ==
- Zhang Mao (March 2018-May 17, 2019)
- Xiao Yaqing (May 17, 2019-August 2, 2020)
- Zhang Gong (August 2, 2020-June 13, 2022)
- Luo Wen (June 13, 2022–August 10, 2026)
- Liu Guiping (September 2, 2026-)
