= Office of the Central Financial Commission =

Chinese Communist Party body

- 中央金融委员会办公室
- Emblem of the Chinese Communist Party

Agency overview
- Formed: 2023
- Type: Administrative agency of the Central Financial Commission
- Jurisdiction: Chinese Communist Party
- Headquarters: Zhongnanhai, Beijing
- Agency executives: He Lifeng, Director; Wang Jiang, Executive Deputy Director; Xia Xiande, Deputy Director
- Parent agency: Central Financial Commission

Office of the Central Financial Commission
- Simplified Chinese: 中央金融委员会办公室
- Traditional Chinese: 中央金融委員會辦公室
Transcriptions
Standard Mandarin
- Hanyu Pinyin: Zhōngyāng Jīnróng Wěiyuánhuì Bàngōngshì

The Office of the Central Financial Commission is the administrative agency of the Central Financial Commission, a policy formulation body of the Central Committee of the Chinese Communist Party (CCP). It is the permanent body of the commission, and handles its day-to-day administrative operations.

== History ==
The Office was established in 2023 under CCP general secretary Xi Jinping as part of the plan on reforming Party and state institutions, together with the Central Financial Commission.

== Organizational Structure ==
- Coordination Bureau

== Leaders ==
=== Director ===
- He Lifeng (November 2023 -)

=== Deputy Director in charge of daily work ===
- Wang Jiang (May 2023 -)

=== Deputy Director ===
- Xia Xiande (November 2023 -)
