= Liu Jin (banker) =

Chinese banker

- 刘金

President of the Bank of China
- In office April 2021 – August 2024
- Preceded by: Wang Jiang

President of China Everbright Bank
- In office January 2021 – April 2021
- Preceded by: Zhang Jinliang
- Succeeded by: Fu Wanjun

Personal details
- Born: 1967 (age 58–59) China
- Party: Chinese Communist Party
- Education: Shandong University

Chinese name
- Simplified Chinese: 刘金
- Traditional Chinese: 劉金
Transcriptions
Standard Mandarin
- Hanyu Pinyin: Liú Jīn

Liu Jin (Chinese: 刘金; born 1967) is a Chinese banker who served as president of the Bank of China. He previously served as president of China Everbright Bank.

== Early life and education ==
Born in 1967, Liu graduated from Shandong University with a master's degree in English language and literature.

== Career ==
After university, he served in various posts in Industrial and Commercial Bank of China before being promoted to vice president of the China Development Bank in September 2018.

In December 2019, he became executive director of China Everbright Group, concurrently serving as president of China Everbright Bank since January 2020.

He was appointed deputy party secretary of the Bank of China in February 2021, concurrently holding the president position since April of the same year. He resigned for personal reasons in August 2024.

Business positions
Preceded by Zhang Jinliang	President of China Everbright Bank; 2020–2021	Succeeded by Fu Wanjun
Preceded by Wang Jiang	President of the Bank of China; 2021–2024	
