= Wang Jiang (banker) =

- 王江

Executive Deputy Director of the Office of the Central Financial Commission
- Incumbent
- Assumed office 18 May 2023
- Preceded by: Office established (Liu Guoqiang as deputy director of the Office of the Financial Stability and Development Committee)

Chairman of China Everbright Group
- In office 8 April 2022 – 2023
- General Manager: Wu Lijun
- Preceded by: Li Xiaopeng

President of China Construction Bank
- In office 5 February 2021 – 24 March 2022
- Preceded by: Liu Guiping
- Succeeded by: Zhang Jinliang [zh]

President of the Bank of China
- In office 13 December 2019 – 5 February 2021
- Preceded by: Liu Liange
- Succeeded by: Liu Jin

Personal details
- Born: July 1963 (age 63) Rushan, Shandong, China
- Party: Chinese Communist Party
- Education: Shandong University of Finance and Economics; Xi'an Jiaotong University; Xiamen University; Liaoning University

Wang Jiang (Chinese: 王江; pinyin: Wáng Jiāng; born July 1963) is a Chinese banker and the current executive deputy director of the Office of the Central Financial Commission (ministerial-level), in office since May 2023. He previously served as president of the Bank of China, president of China Construction Bank, and party secretary of China Everbright Group.

== Early life ==
Wang was born in Rushan, Shandong, in July 1963. After resuming the college entrance examination in 1980, he entered Shandong Economics College (now Shandong University of Finance and Economics), majoring in finance. He joined the Chinese Communist Party (CCP) in December 1983. After graduating in 1984, he stayed at the college and worked successively as assistant, instructor, and associate professor.

== Career ==
Since June 1999, he served in various posts in China Construction Bank before being promoted to vice president of the Bank of Communications in March 2015.

In July 2017, he was appointed vice governor of Jiangsu, but having held the position for only two years.

In December 2019, he was made president of the Bank of China, and held that office until January 2021, when he moved back to China Construction Bank as its president.

On 4 March 2022, he took office as party secretary of China Everbright Group, the top political position in the state-owned enterprise.

He was a delegate to the 13th National People's Congress.

Business positions
Preceded by Liu Liange	President of the Bank of China; 2019–2021	Succeeded by Liu Jin
Preceded by Liu Guiping	President of China Construction Bank; 2021–2022	Succeeded by TBA
Party political offices
Preceded by Li Xiaopeng	Communist Party Secretary of China Everbright Group; 2022–present	Incumbent
