= Geng Changsuo =

PRC model worker

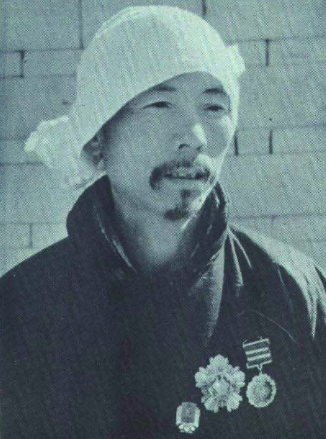
Geng Changsuo

Geng Changsuo (Chinese: 耿长锁) was a national agricultural model worker in the People's Republic of China.

== Biography ==
Beginning in the 1940s, Geng Changsuo was praised in Chinese Communist Party publications as "Co-op leader."

In 1952, Geng was designated as a national model worker for his contributions to agriculture. He was also a village-level official in Hebei province. Geng was viewed as having successfully carried out Mao Zedong's line of struggling against capitalism to advance the cause of communism. American academic Edward Friedman writes that Geng "was a committed Maoist collectivist."

Later that year, he visited the Soviet Union as part of a group that spent three months visiting collective farms, factories, chemical plants, dams, and research institutes in Russia, Ukraine, and Kazakhstan. Back in Hebei, he spoke to audiences throughout the province promoting the idea that "Soviet agricultural collectivization, mechanization, and electrification is the direction that we will follow. It is the goal of our study." He made a similar trip to Eastern Europe in 1957 after which he also relayed his experience to local Hebei audiences.

Geng was a Hebei delegate to the National People's Congress in its first (1954), second (1959), and third (1964) sessions.

== See also ==
- History of agriculture in China
