= Guanghui Temple Huatai Pagoda =

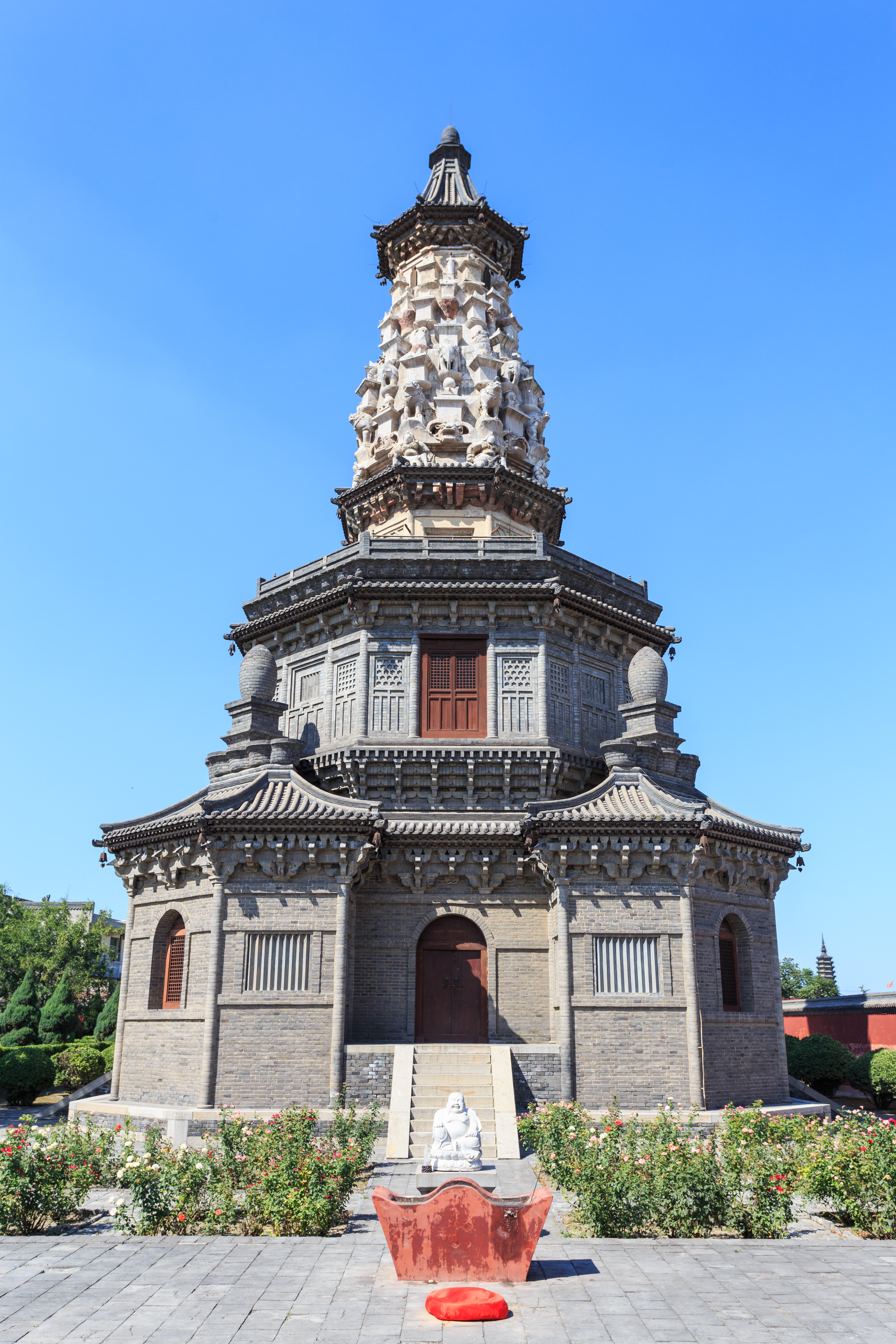
- National key cultural relics protection unit announced by the State Council of the People's Republic of China
- Interactive map of Guanghui Temple Huatai Pagoda
- Location: Zhengding County, Hebei Province
- Type: Old buildings and historical monuments
- Restored date: 1999

Guanghui Temple Huata (also known as Guanghui Temple Flower Pagoda and Guanghui Temple Multipurpose Pagoda) is located on Guanghui Road, Zhengding County, Shijiazhuang City, Hebei Province, People's Republic of China, and is a 4-story octagonal Huata. The tower was built in the Tang Dynasty and rebuilt in the Dading years of the Jin Dynasty. The entire pagoda has 3 floors in the style of an attic, with steps on the first and second floors, and 2 statues of Buddha enshrined in the heart chamber of the pagoda on the third floor. The fourth layer is a bouquet-shaped pagoda statue of warriors, elephants, lions and Bodhisattvas. During the Republic of China period, the four sets of chambers below the tower were destroyed during the war. In 1961, Guanghui Temple Huata was listed as a national key cultural relic protected unit. In 1999, the repair project of Guanghui Temple Huata was completed, and the whole temple was restored to its original appearance.

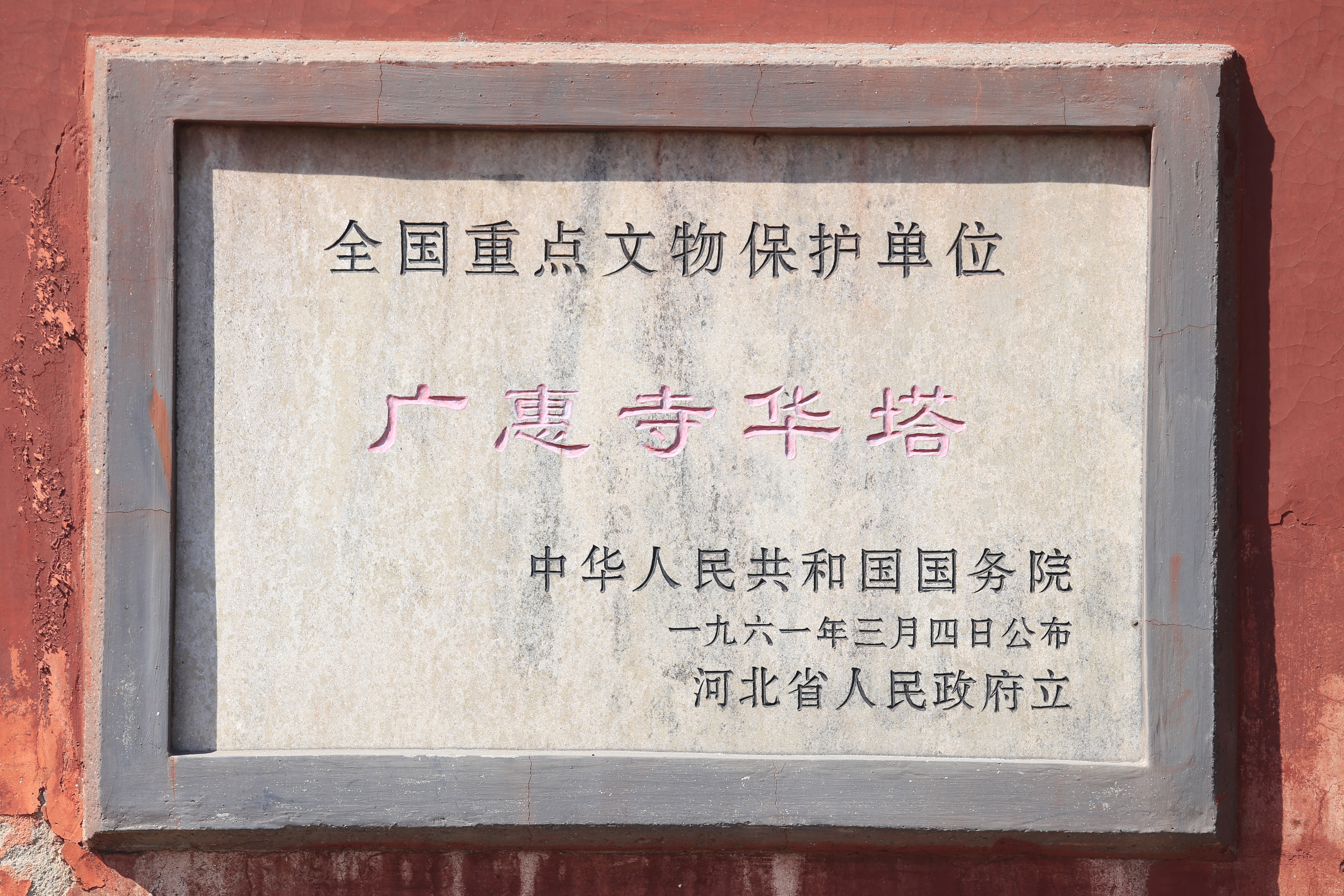
Guanghui Temple Huata Cultural Relics Signboard

== History ==
The Guanghui Temple Huata, also known as the Guanghui Temple Flower Pagoda and Guanghui Temple Multipurpose Pagoda, is known as the Huata because its shape resembles a bouquet. It originally belonged to the temple within the Guang Hui Temple, which was built during the Zheng Yuan period (785-804) of the Tang Dynasty. There are many records about the date of the construction of Guanghui Temple Huata, including the theory that the pagoda was built during the reign of Emperor Gaozu Li Yuan of the Tang Dynasty. Some say that the pagoda was built during the Sixteen Kingdoms period, repaired during the Tang Dynasty, destroyed during the Huangtong period of the Jin Dynasty, and rebuilt during the Dading period. Others state that the pagoda was built during the Sui or Tang Dynasty. Based on the shape and architectural style of the tower, the State Council of the People's Republic of China finally adopted the statement that the tower was rebuilt in the Jin Dynasty in the list of the first batch of national key cultural relics protection units published in 1961. During the Ming and Qing dynasties, Guanghui Temple had a strong incense culture, and the pagoda was restored twice during the Ming dynasty, once during the Zhengtong period. In the late Qing Dynasty, Guanghui Temple gradually fell into disuse, its architectural ruins were covered by modern buildings, the only remaining temple being the Guanghui Temple Huata. During the Republic of China period, all four sets of chambers under the Huata of Guanghui Temple were destroyed during the war, and only the main tower part remained. From 1994 to 1999, the Guanghui Temple Huata was fully repaired and largely restored to its original appearance. During the restoration process, the staff also found two inscriptions from the fourth year of Taiping Xingguo (979) and one from the tenth year of Xining (1071), among which the inscriptions from the fourth year of Taiping Xingguo can be identified as inscriptions by visitors according to their contents, and then the date of the construction of the tower can be determined to be no later than the Northern Song Dynasty.

== Structure ==
Guanghui Temple Huata is located on Guanghui Road, Zhengding County, Hebei Province. It is a four-story octagonal pagoda. The tower faces south and is made of brick with a height of 40.5 meters.

The first layer of the tower is octagonal in plan, with three rooms on each side of the outer wall of the tower in four directions and a door that can lead to the tower room in the middle, where the north door is facing the stairs that can ascend to the second floor; as well as a flat hexagonal single-story suite of chambers connected to the tower was built in each of the four directions. (Note: Since the form of these sets of chambers is closer to that of the pagoda, some arguments, therefore, suggest that the Guanghui Temple Huatai is actually the Vajra Throne Pagoda.) The set of chambers is pavilion-shaped and topped with green tiles, with brick bucket arches, under the top eaves of both the tower and the set of chambers.

The second layer of the tower is octagonal in plan, with three openings on each side of the outer wall, with niche doors in the middle of the east, west, south, and north sides, and a latticed false window next to the niche door. There are straight false latticed windows in the middle of the southeast, northeast, southwest, and northwest sides, and another false latticed window on each side. The second layer of the pagoda has a brick arch over the top to support the eaves. Above the eaves of the tower is the octagonal flat base, and above it is the third layer of the tower body. The second floor of the pagoda room is a cloister-type structure, from the first-floor stairs that can be ascended to the second-floor south cloister. The west side of the cloister on the second floor can be reached through the steps from the north door of the outer cloister on the third floor, and followed by the outer cloister from the south door into the third floor of the tower room.

The third layer of the tower is significantly inward compared to the second layer of the tower, so that the top of the second layer of the tower forms a wide flat base, with a fence around the perimeter. The third layer of the tower only has a square door on the south side, whereas the east, west, and north sides are false doors. At the top are the eaves of the tower, and above the eaves stands the fourth layer of the tower. From the south door, one can enter the interior of the pagoda room, which is octagonal and has a brick Buddhist altar on the north wall, 3.06 meters long, 1.3 meters wide, and 0.39 meters high, containing two statues of Buddha from the Tang Dynasty. The two Buddha statues are sitting in the north and facing south, each enshrined on a girdled Buddhist throne, with the two thrones arranged side by side. The two girdles are the same, both made of Chinese white jade, and are composed of the upper square, and girdle. The lower square is composed of three parts, and the four sides of the two upper squares have inscriptions, in which it is recorded that the two Buddha statues are from the Tang Dynasty. In the eleventh year of the reign of King Jeongwon (795), the pagoda was moved to Guanghui Temple. The two Buddhas are roughly the same form, with the head and right arm missing and the left hand and right foot mutilated. The left side of the Buddha is 152 centimetres high, the residual height of the statue is 75 centimetres, and the widest width between the knees being of 81 centimetres. The right side of the Buddha is 155 cm high even with the pedestal, 78 cm high with the residue of the statue, and 82 cm wide between the knees. Both Buddhas are slightly stout, with broad, flat shoulders and three serpentine knotted lines on their necks. Buddha beads hang around their necks, and they are sitting cross-legged in their robe with their right shoulder bare. The left-hand makes a stance and is placed flat in front of the abdomen. The robe covers both legs and both feet are bare. The two Buddhas have rectangular holes cut in the middle of the shoulders, at the waist, and the two corners at the back of the Sumeru seat. In addition, on the east side of the Buddhas, there is a niche on the south side, north side and east side of the inner wall, where there is a statue of Ruan Xian playing a musical instrument, a statue of a Sheng playing a musical instrument, and a statue of a Konghou playing a vertical instrument. On the west side, there is one niche on the south, one on the north, and one on the east side of the inner wall, with a statue of a pipa player, a sheng player, and an ocarina player, respectively.

The fourth layer is the bouquet-shaped tower part of Huata. (Note: There is also the view that the third and fourth floors are combined as the third tower.) The hole is octagonal but upwardly divided, and there are 8 types of shapes, which are cross-distributed in eight layers on eight sides of the octagon. The first floor has a statue of Rex at each of the eight corners; the second layer has a roar in the middle of each of the eight sides. The third floor has a standing lion in each of the eight corners and a small square tower in the middle of each of the eight sides. The fourth floor has a standing elephant in the middle of each of the eight sides and a square tower at each of the eight corners. The fifth floor has a Buddha statue at each of the eight corners. The sixth floor with eight front facades of uplifted lotuses and a square pagoda at each corner. The seventh floor has a square tower on each of the eight fronts. There is a statue of Bodhisattva on each of the eight front sides of the eighth floor. The original colour paintings on this tower layer are all peeling off. The fourth layer of the pagoda is topped with brick arches and rafters, flies. and squares, with octagonal eaves at the top. Above the eaves of the pagoda is the pagoda brake, now only the brake pole remains.

== Protection ==
In 1961, Guanghui Temple Huata was listed as a national key cultural relic protected unit. In 1981, the Zhengding County Cultural Relics Administration reinforced the Guanghui Temple Huata and the outer wall of the ground floor, but the related reinforcement material lost its effect and mostly peeled off in the early 1990s. In 1994, the State Administration of Cultural Relics approved the reinforcement and restoration project of Guanghui Temple Huata, and the Hebei Institute of Ancient Architecture Conservation undertook the project. In 1999, the restoration work was completed and the four chambers at the bottom were reconstructed and the statue outside the fourth floor of the pagoda was completed, but the pagoda brakes could not be further restored due to a lack of physical evidence. In 2006, a hand-copied volume of the "Ksitigarbha Bodhisattva Sutra" was placed inside the top of the pagoda of Guanghui Temple. In March 2015, criminals attempted to dig their way through the tunnels underneath the Guanghui Temple Huata, and then excavate the artifacts inside the possible underground palace in Huata. Eventually, the public security authorities cracked the case before they could get their hands on it and arrested all the perpetrators.
