= Hebei =

Province in North China

Hebei 河北 Hopeh, Ho-pei
- Province

Name transcription(s)
  - Chinese: 河北省 (Héběi shěng)
  - Abbreviation: HE; HEB; 冀 (Jì)
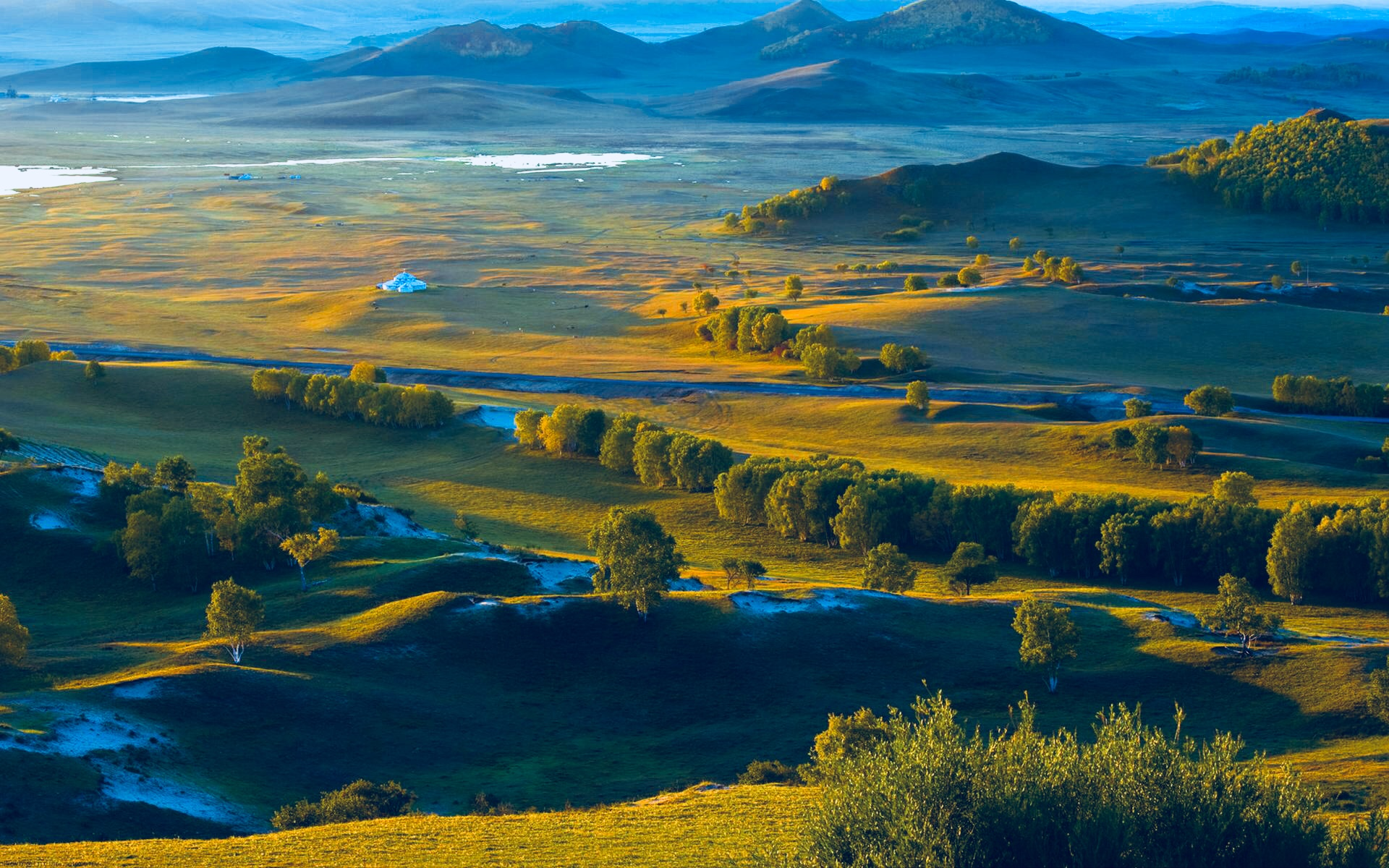
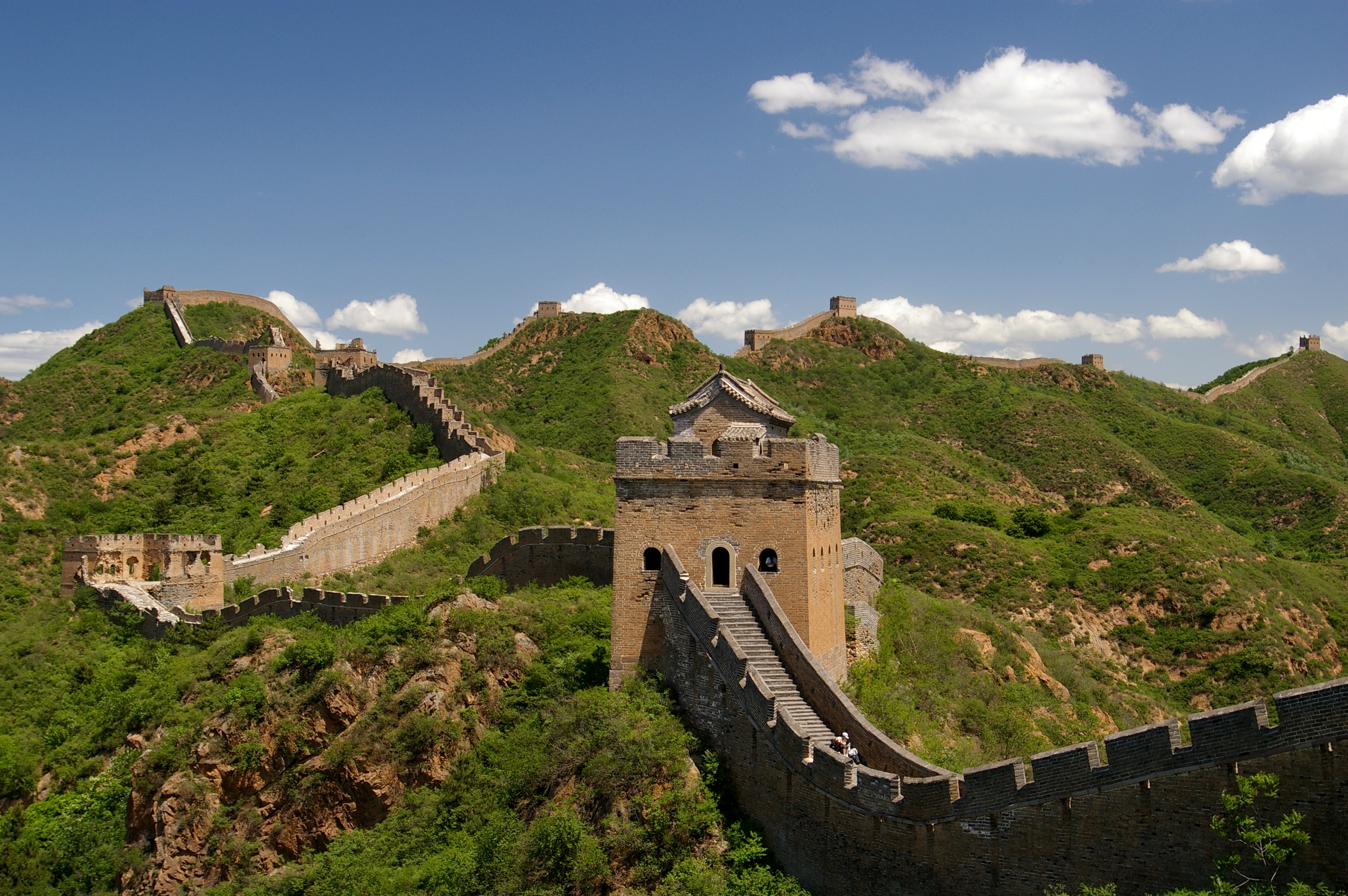
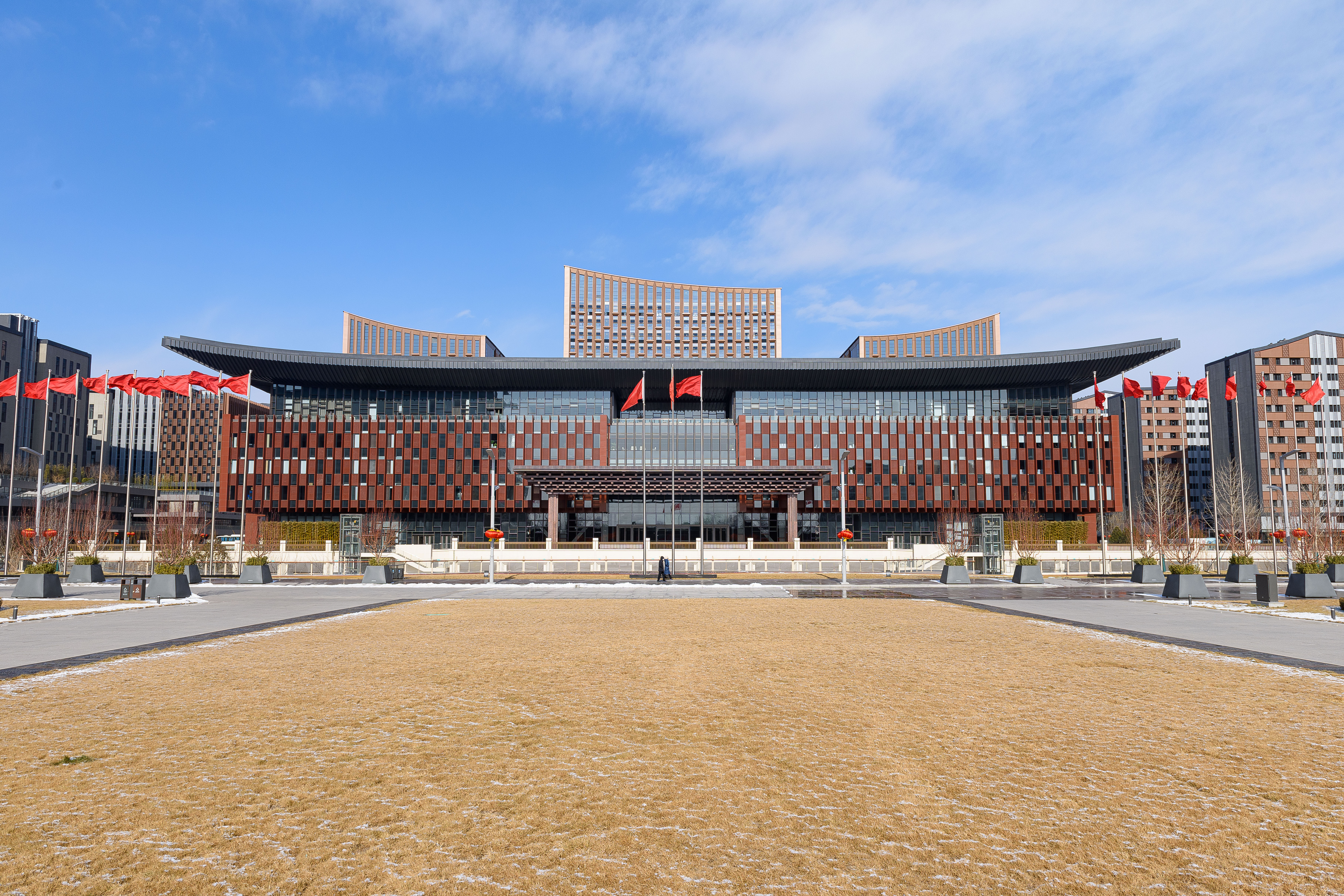
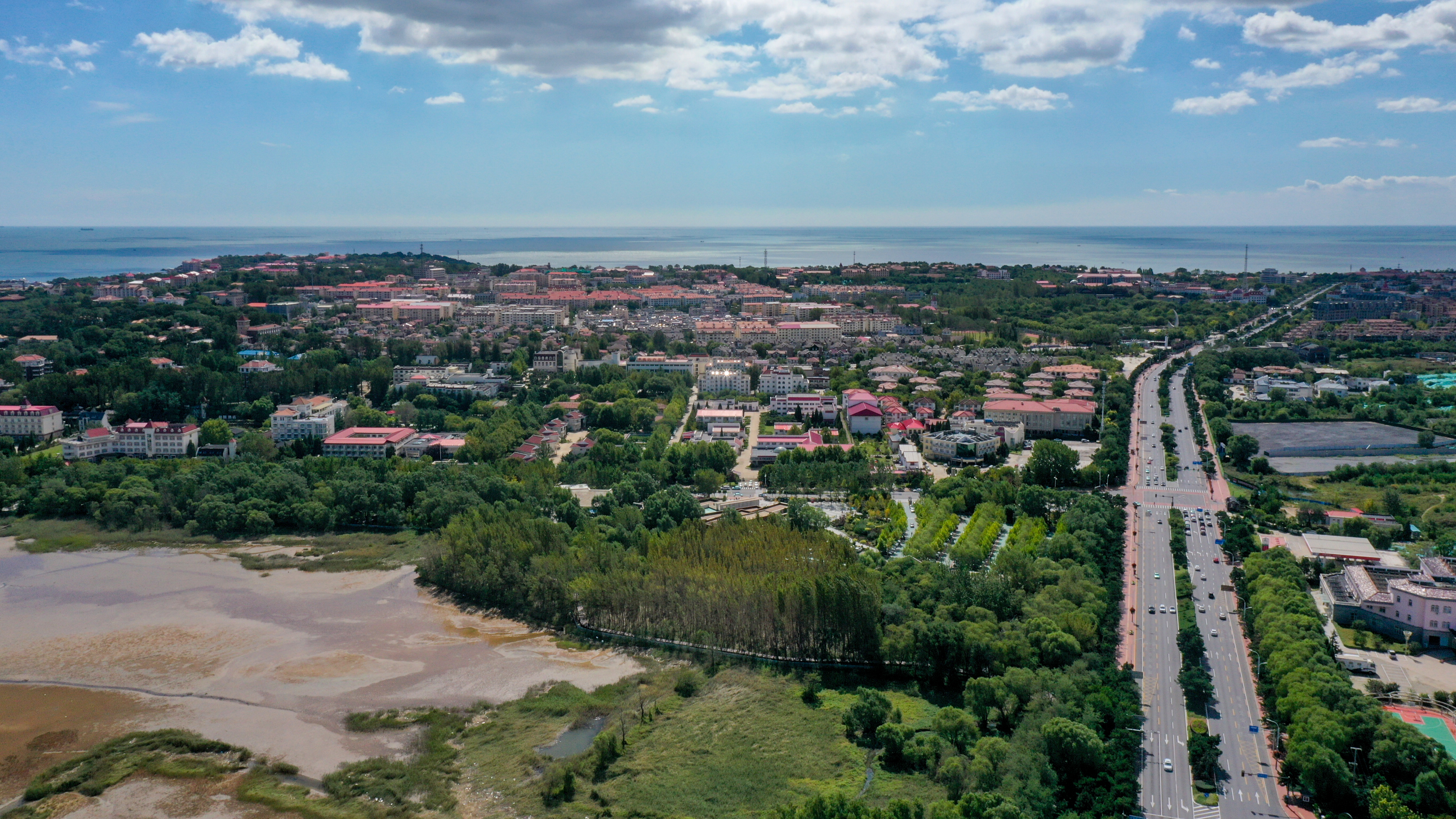
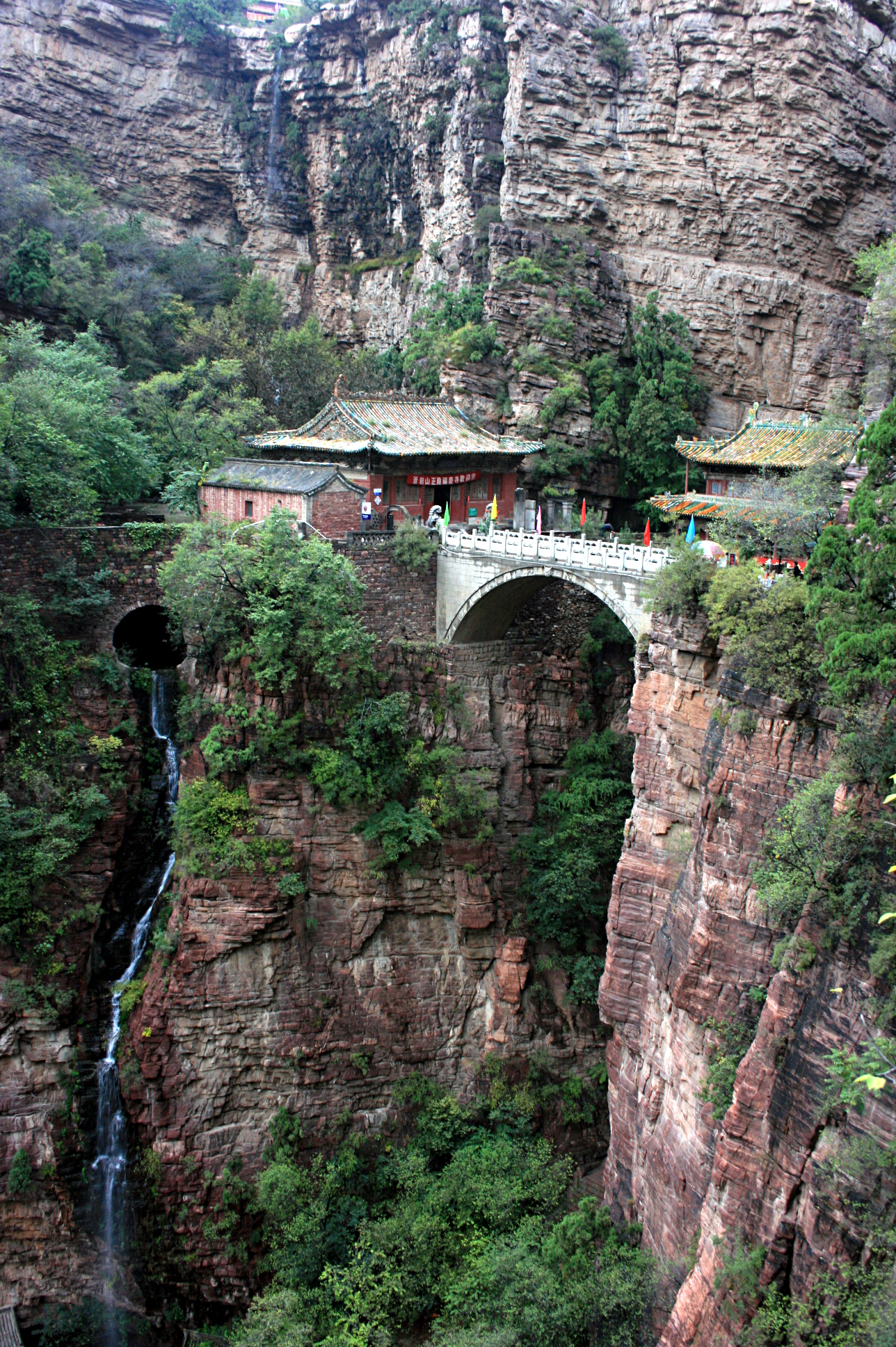
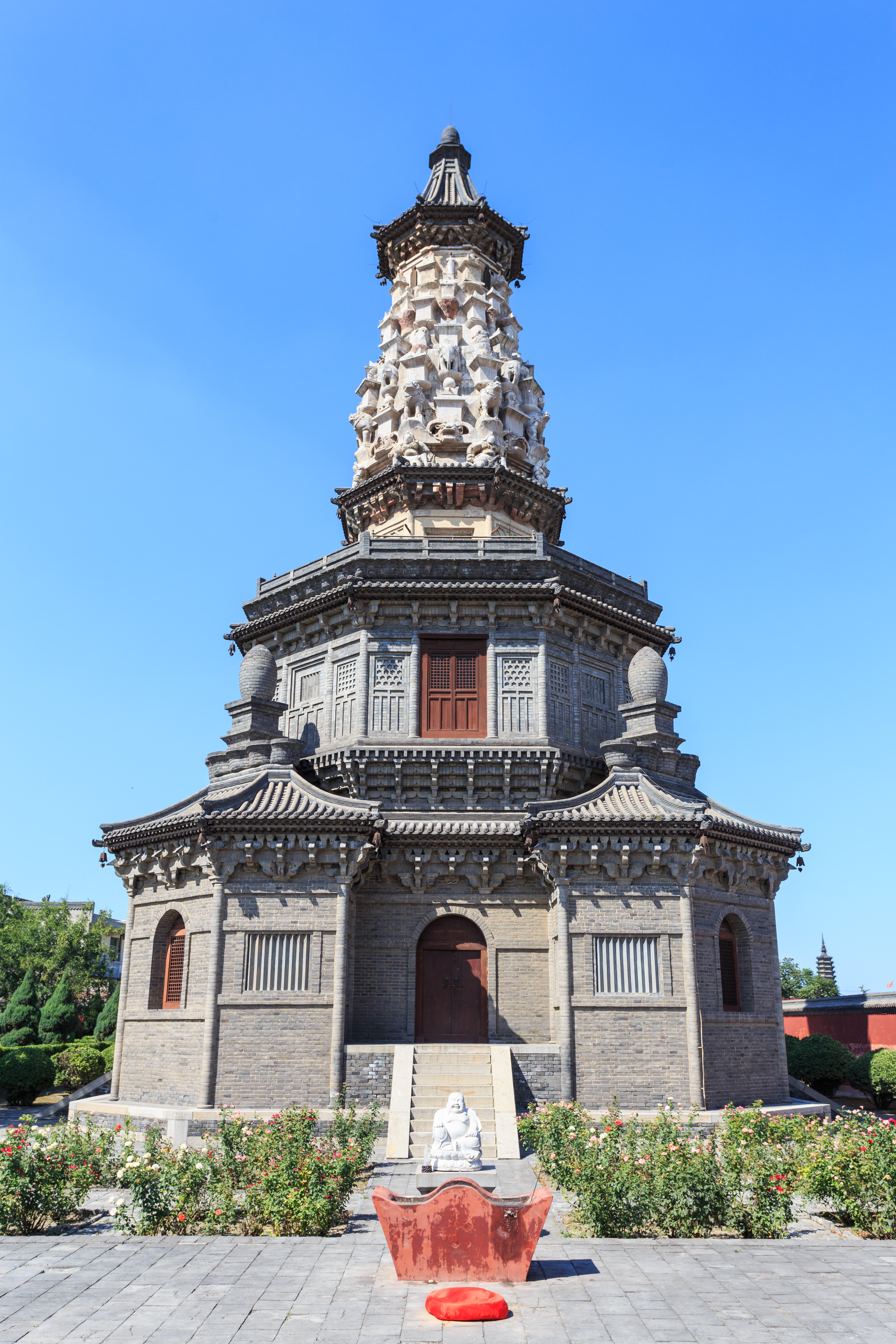
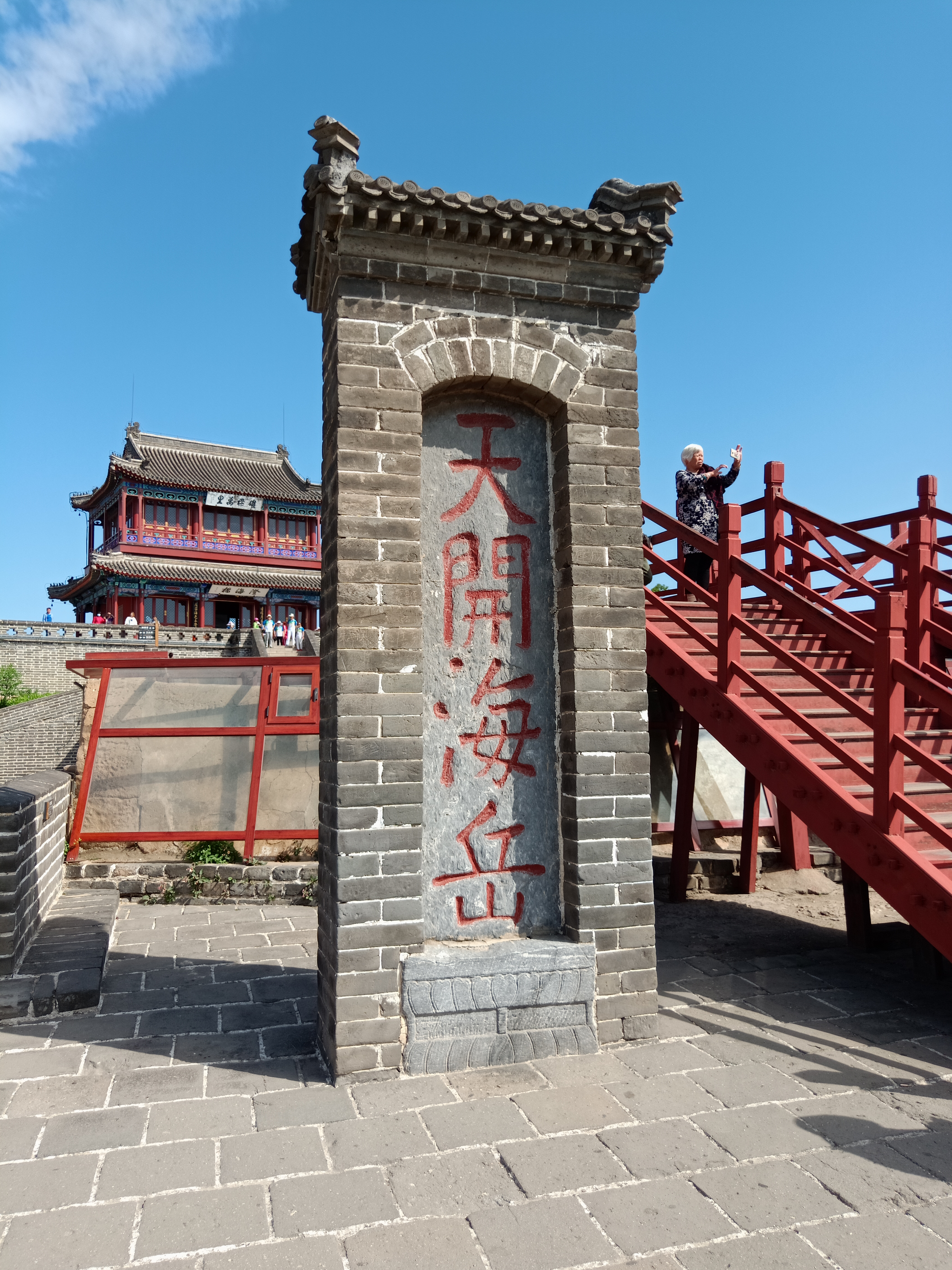
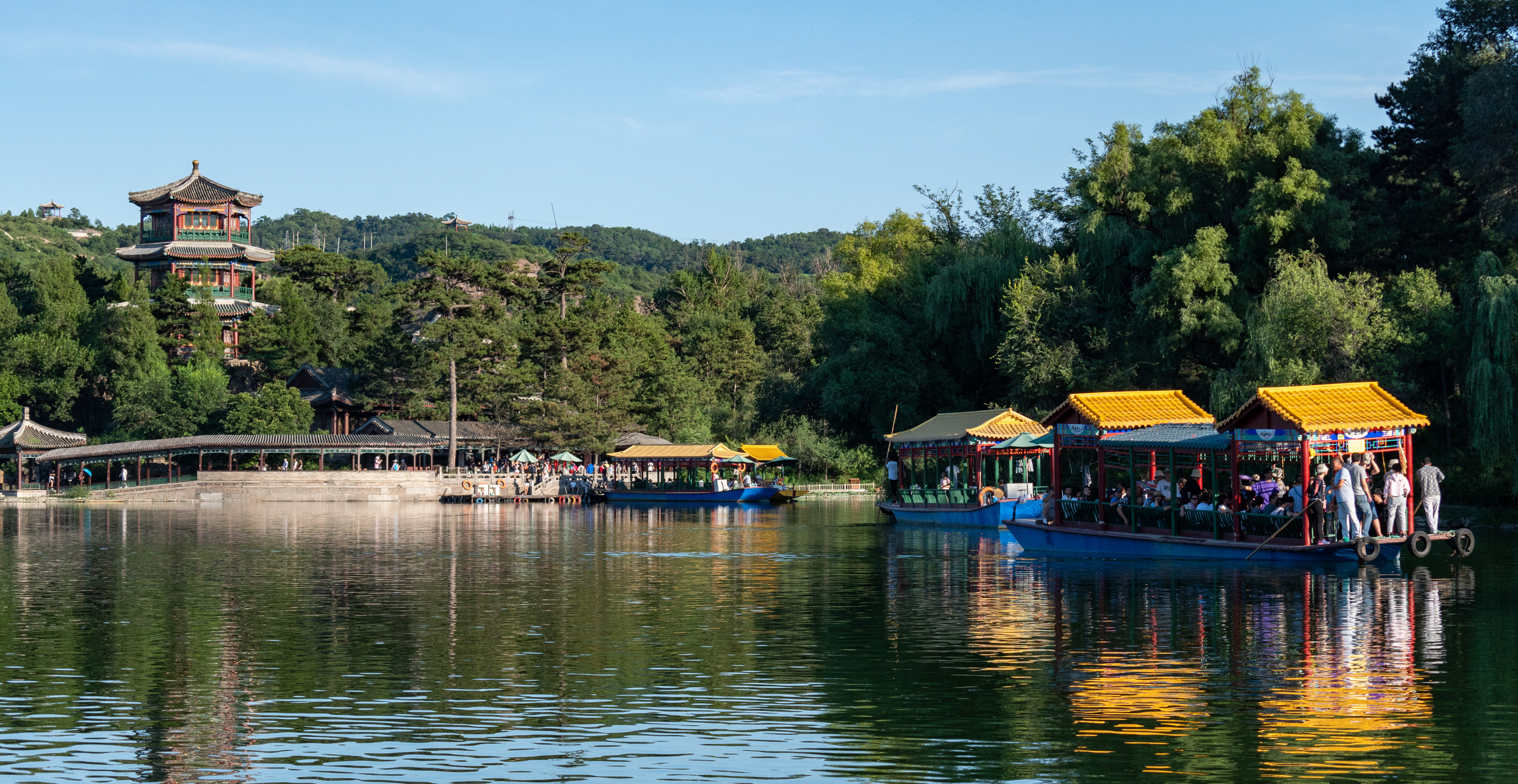
- Bashang Meadows in Fengning Great Wall at Jinshanling Xiong'an New Area Beidaihe Mount Cangyan Hua Pagoda Shanhai Pass Chengde Mountain Resort

- Location of Hebei in China
- Coordinates: 39°18′N 116°42′E
- Country: China
- Named for: Yellow River
- Capital (and largest city): Shijiazhuang
- Divisions: 11 prefectures, 168 counties, 2,207 townships

Government
  - Type: Province
  - Body: Hebei Provincial People's Congress
  - Party Secretary: Luo Wen
  - Governor: Zhao Chenxin (acting)
  - CPPCC chairman: Zhang Guohua
  - National People's Congress representation: 123 deputies

Area
  - Total: 188,800 km^{2} (72,900 sq mi)
  - Rank: 12th
- Highest elevation (Mount Xiaowutai): 2,882 m (9,455 ft)

Population (2020)
  - Total: 74,610,235
  - Rank: 6th
  - Density: 395.2/km^{2} (1,024/sq mi)
  - Rank: 11th

Demographics
  - Ethnic composition: Han: 96%; Manchu: 3%; Hui: 0.8%; Mongol: 0.3%
  - Languages and dialects: Jilu Mandarin, Beijing Mandarin, Jin

GDP (2025)
  - Total: CN¥4.931 trillion (13th; US$690 billion)
  - Per capita: CN¥66,936 (26th; US$9,371)
- ISO 3166 code: CN-HE
- HDI (2023): 0.771 (22nd) – high
- Website: hebei.gov.cn

Hebei
- "Hebei" in Chinese characters
- Chinese: 河北
- Postal: Hopeh
- Literal meaning: "North of the Yellow River"
Transcriptions
Standard Mandarin
- Hanyu Pinyin: Héběi
- Bopomofo: ㄏㄜˊ ㄅㄟˇ
- Wade–Giles: Ho^{2}-pei^{3}
- Tongyong Pinyin: Hé-běi
- IPA: [xɤ̌.pèɪ]
other Mandarin
- Xiao'erjing: حَ‌بُوِشْ
Wu
- Romanization: Ghu^{平}poh^{入}
Hakka
- Romanization: Hò-pet
Yue: Cantonese
- Yale Romanization: Hòh-bāk
- Jyutping: ho4 bak1
- IPA: [hɔ˩.pɐk̚˥]
Southern Min
- Hokkien POJ: Hô-pak

Abbreviation
- Chinese: 冀
Transcriptions
Standard Mandarin
- Hanyu Pinyin: Jì
- Bopomofo: ㄐㄧˋ
- Wade–Giles: Chi^{4}
- Tongyong Pinyin: Jì
- IPA: [tɕî]
other Mandarin
- Xiao'erjing: جِ
Yue: Cantonese
- Yale Romanization: Kei
- Jyutping: kei3
- IPA: [kʰej˧]
Southern Min
- Tâi-lô: Kī

Zhili Province
- Traditional Chinese: 直隸省
- Simplified Chinese: 直隶省
- Literal meaning: Directly ruled
Transcriptions
Standard Mandarin
- Hanyu Pinyin: Zhílì shěng
- Bopomofo: ㄓˊ ㄌㄧˋ ㄕㄥˇ
- Wade–Giles: Chih^{2}-li^{4} Sheng^{3}
- Tongyong Pinyin: Jhíh-lì shěng
- IPA: [ʈʂɻ̩̌.lî ʂə̀ŋ]
other Mandarin
- Xiao'erjing: ژِلِي شېڭ

Hebei (Note: Chinese: 河北; lit. 'north of the Yellow River' UK: /ˌhɜːˈbeɪ/ or /həˈbeɪ/, US: /ˈhʌˈbeɪ/; Postal romanization: Hopeh) is a province in North China. Its capital and largest city is Shijiazhuang. Hebei encloses the direct-administered municipalities of Beijing and Tianjin on land, and borders Liaoning to the northeast, Inner Mongolia to the northwest, Shanxi to the west, Henan to the south and Shandong to the southeast; to the east it faces the Bohai Sea. With 74.6 million inhabitants at the 2020 census, it is China's sixth-most populous province; the provincial statistics bureau estimated the resident population at 73.54 million at the end of 2025.

The region was divided between the states of Yan and Zhao during the Warring States period, which gave it the literary name Yanzhao. From the early 15th century, when the Ming dynasty moved its capital to Beijing, the area was governed as the metropolitan province of Zhili ("directly ruled"); it took its present name in 1928, after the capital of the Republic of China moved to Nanjing. Hebei contains all or part of four UNESCO World Heritage Sites, among them the Great Wall and the Chengde Mountain Resort, and six National Famous Historical and Cultural Cities.

Hebei's economy rests on heavy industry and agriculture, and the province has long been China's largest steel producer. Its gross domestic product was 4.93 trillion yuan in 2025. Together with Beijing and Tianjin it forms the Jing-Jin-Ji megalopolis, the focus of a national regional-integration strategy that includes the Xiong'an New Area.

== Etymology ==
"Hebei" means 'north of the river', referring to the province's position north of the Yellow River on the North China Plain. The name was first used for an administrative unit under the Tang dynasty, which in 627 created Hebei Circuit (Hebei Dao) as one of ten circuits covering the empire. The province's one-character abbreviation, Jì (冀), comes from Jizhou, one of the Nine Provinces described in the Yu Gong. Its traditional literary name, Yanzhao (燕赵), joins the names of Yan and Zhao, the states that ruled the region in the Spring and Autumn and Warring States periods.

After the Yongle Emperor moved the Ming capital from Nanjing to Beijing in 1421, the province surrounding the capital became known as North Zhili and later simply Zhili, meaning 'directly ruled'. The name Zhili remained in use until 1928, when the province was renamed Hebei.

== History ==
=== Prehistory and antiquity ===
Peking Man, an early population of Homo erectus, lived several hundred thousand years ago at Zhoukoudian, in what is now Fangshan District of Beijing near the Hebei border. The Beifudi site in Yi County preserves a Neolithic village dating to about 8,000–7,000 years ago.

Many early Chinese myths are set in the region. Fuxi, one of the Three Sovereigns and Five Emperors, is said to have lived near present-day Xingtai, and the legendary Battle of Zhuolu, in which the Yellow Emperor defeated Chiyou, is traditionally located in Zhuolu County, Zhangjiakou.

During the Spring and Autumn period (770–476 BC), Hebei was divided between Yan in the north and Jin in the south. A people known as the Di also moved into the northern plains in this period and established the state of Zhongshan in central Hebei. In the Warring States period (475–221 BC), Jin was partitioned and much of its territory in Hebei passed to Zhao.

=== Qin to Tang dynasties ===
The Qin dynasty unified China in 221 BC. Under the Han dynasty (206 BC – AD 220), the area was administered as two provinces (zhou): You in the north and Ji in the south. As Han authority collapsed, most of Hebei was held by the warlords Gongsun Zan in the north and Yuan Shao in the south. Yuan Shao prevailed over Gongsun Zan but was defeated by Cao Cao at the Battle of Guandu in 200, and the region later became part of the state of Wei founded by Cao Cao's son.

After the invasions of northern peoples at the end of the Western Jin dynasty, Hebei's position on the northern frontier meant that it changed hands repeatedly during the Sixteen Kingdoms period, passing between Later Zhao, Former Yan, Former Qin and Later Yan. The Northern Wei reunified northern China in 439 but split in 534, after which Hebei was ruled by the Eastern Wei and then the Northern Qi, whose capital, Ye, lay near modern Linzhang. The Sui dynasty reunified China in 589.

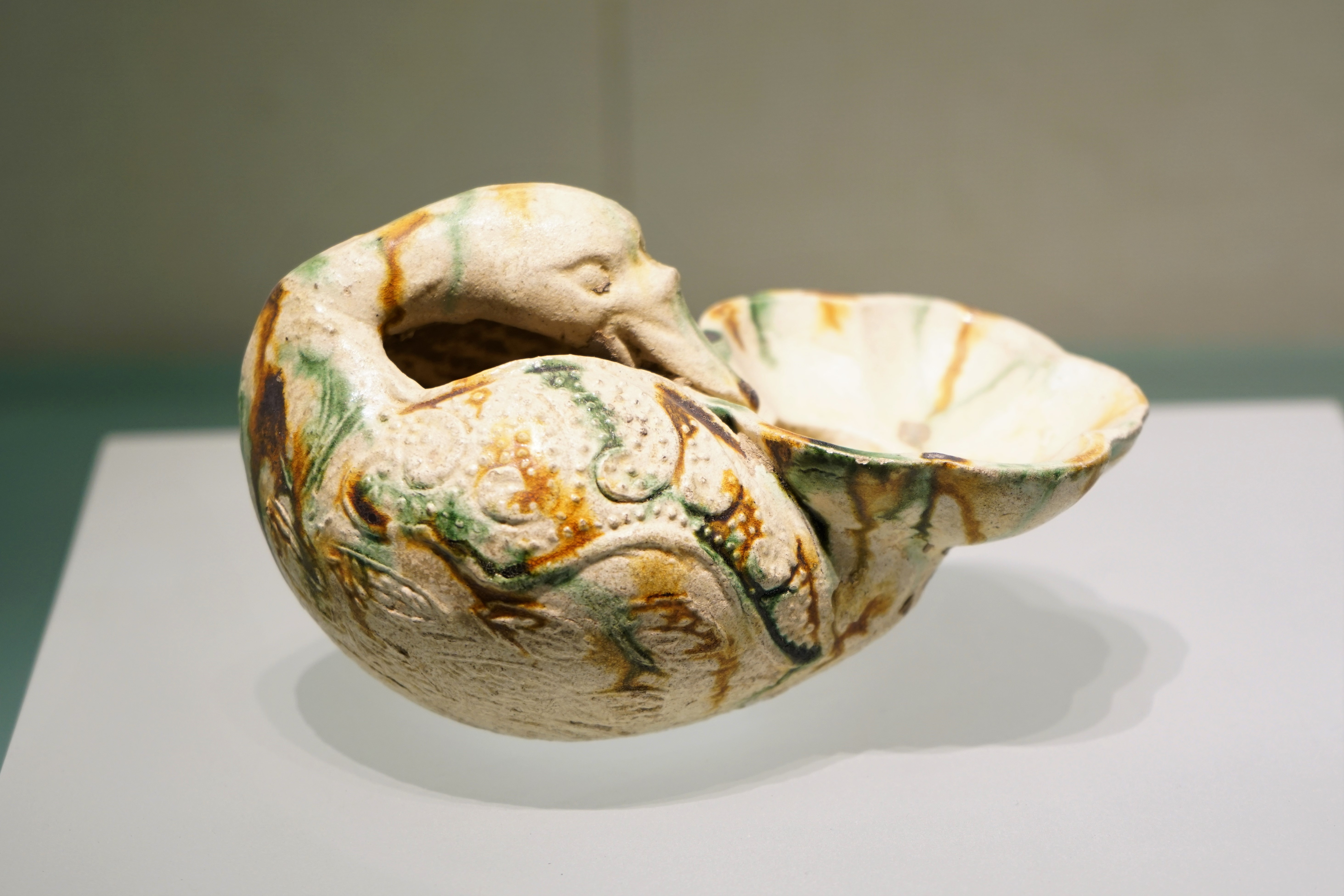
Tang dynasty sancai duck-shaped cup excavated in Anxin County

Under the Tang dynasty (618–907), the region formed Hebei Circuit. It was the base of the Great Yan state proclaimed during the An Lushan Rebellion (755–763), and afterwards the Lulong military governorship remained largely autonomous from the Tang court for most of the 9th century. During the Five Dynasties and Ten Kingdoms period, Lulong was briefly the short-lived state of Yan before being conquered in 913 by Li Cunxu, who went on to found the Later Tang (923–936). Shi Jingtang, founder of the Later Jin, ceded much of northern Hebei to the Khitan Liao dynasty. Because these Sixteen Prefectures lay inside the line of the Great Wall, their loss left the Chinese plain exposed to the Khitans for more than a century.

=== Song to Yuan dynasties ===
The Sixteen Prefectures remained contested between the Northern Song dynasty (960–1127) and the Liao. After the Jingkang incident of 1127, the Song lost all of North China, including Hebei, to the Jurchen Jin dynasty. Hebei was also badly affected by flooding: between 1048 and 1128 the Yellow River flowed directly across the province rather than to its south.

The Mongol-led Yuan dynasty divided China into provinces but did not create a province of Hebei; instead, the region was administered directly by the Central Secretariat in the capital, Dadu.

=== Ming and Qing dynasties ===
Zhili province in 1820, during the Qing dynasty

Under the early Ming dynasty, when the capital was at Nanjing, the region was administered as Beiping. The Yongle Emperor renamed Beiping as Beijing in 1403 and formally moved the capital there in 1421. The surrounding metropolitan region, North Zhili (Beizhili), included most of modern Hebei, parts of Henan and Shandong, and present-day Beijing and Tianjin.

The Qing dynasty also made Beijing its capital after 1644. The former Southern Zhili around Nanjing became Jiangnan, while Northern Zhili became simply Zhili. The northern borders of Zhili extended deep into Inner Mongolia and overlapped with the jurisdiction of the Mongol leagues.

=== Republic of China ===
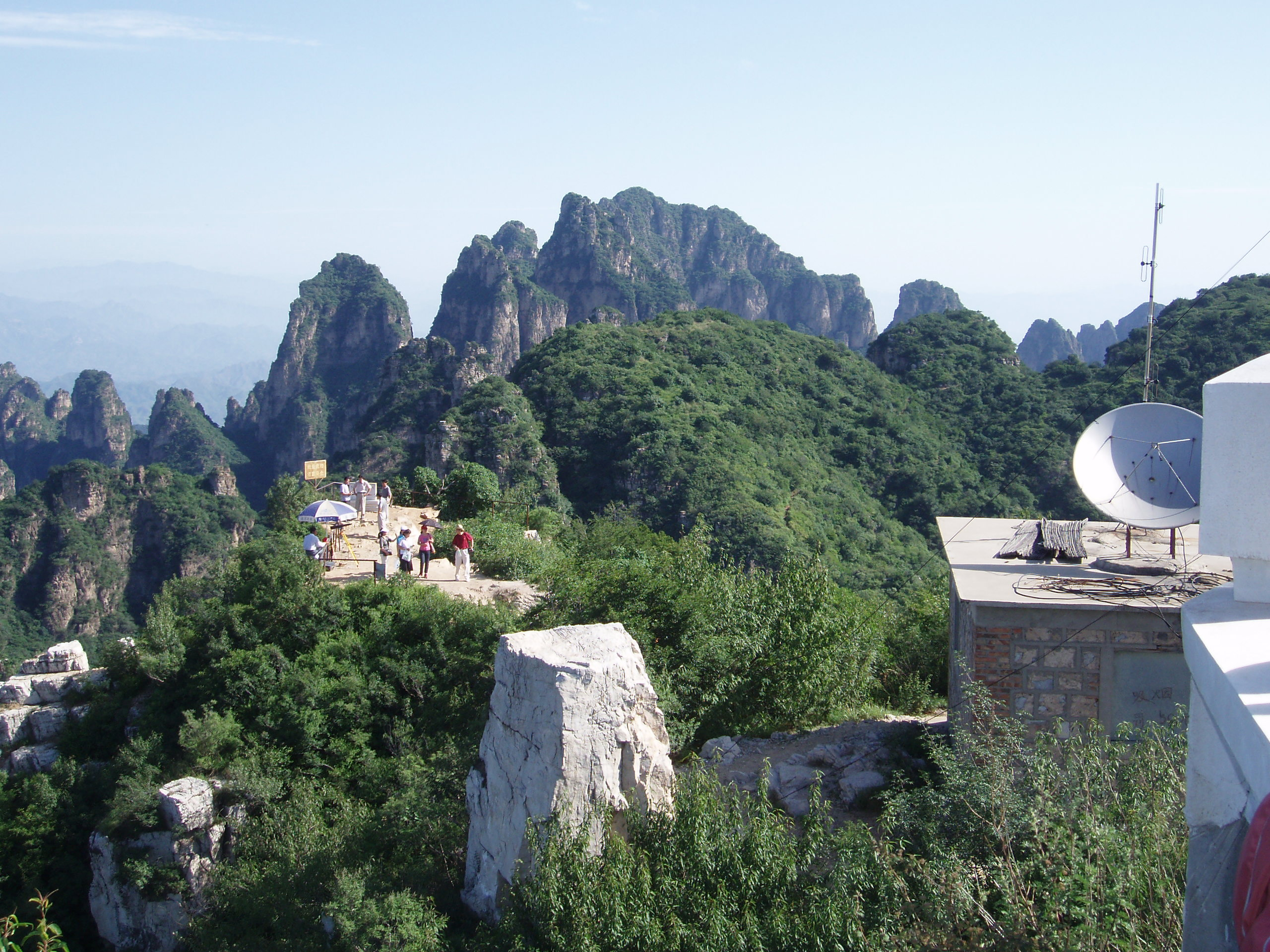
Mount Langya in Yi County

The Qing dynasty collapsed in 1912 and was replaced by the Republic of China. As China fragmented into rival warlord factions, Zhili's proximity to Beijing made it the scene of the Zhili–Anhui War and the First and Second Zhili–Fengtian Wars. After the Kuomintang's Northern Expedition the national capital was moved to Nanjing in 1928. The government transferred the northern parts of Zhili to neighbouring provinces and renamed the remainder Hebei. The provincial seat moved from Beiping to Tianjin in 1930 and to Baoding in 1935.

Japan occupied most of Hebei after the outbreak of the Second Sino-Japanese War in 1937, and the province was nominally administered by Japanese-sponsored collaborationist governments, from 1940 under the Reorganized National Government of the Republic of China.

=== People's Republic of China ===
The founding of the People's Republic of China in 1949 brought several boundary changes. The region around Chengde, previously part of Rehe Province, and the region around Zhangjiakou, previously part of Chahar Province, were merged into Hebei, extending its borders north of the Great Wall. Puyang was transferred to the new Pingyuan Province in 1949 and then to Henan when Pingyuan was abolished in 1952, ending Hebei's frontage on the Yellow River.

Baoding remained the provincial capital until 1958, when Tianjin was placed under Hebei and became its capital. The capital returned to Baoding in 1966 and moved to Shijiazhuang in 1968. On 28 July 1976, Tangshan was struck by the Tangshan earthquake, one of the deadliest earthquakes of the 20th century; the official death toll was about 242,000, although some estimates are much higher.

Hebei, Beijing and Tianjin together form the Jing-Jin-Ji region, a megalopolis of about 130 million people. In 2017 the central government established the Xiong'an New Area in central Hebei to absorb some of Beijing's non-capital functions.

== Geography ==
Hebei covers 188,800 square kilometres (72,900 sq mi). Its landscape is unusually varied, and the provincial government describes it as the only Chinese province with plateau, mountains, hills, plains, lakes and coastline. Most of central and southern Hebei lies on the North China Plain. The Taihang Mountains rise along the western edge of the province and the Yan Mountains cross the north; beyond them lies the Bashang Plateau, the southern edge of the Mongolian Plateau. The highest peak is Mount Xiaowutai in Yu County, at 2,882 m (9,455 ft).

Hebei borders the Bohai Sea to the east. The Hai River drainage basin covers most of the centre and south of the province, and the Luan River basin covers the northeast. Excluding reservoirs, the largest lake is Baiyangdian in the Xiong'an New Area.

=== Climate ===
Hebei has a monsoon-influenced humid continental climate, with cold, dry winters and hot, humid summers; most rain falls in summer. On the central plain at Baoding, mean temperatures are about −3 °C (27 °F) in January and 27 °C (81 °F) in July. On the coast at Qinhuangdao, the January and July means are −4.8 °C (23.4 °F) and 25 °C (77 °F), and annual precipitation is about 630 mm (25 in), some 70% of which falls between June and August.

== Government ==
Like other provincial-level divisions of mainland China, Hebei has a dual party-government system. The governor heads the Hebei Provincial People's Government, but the most powerful official is the Secretary of the Chinese Communist Party (CCP) Hebei Provincial Committee, commonly called the Party Secretary, who outranks the governor. Luo Wen became Party Secretary in July 2026, succeeding Ni Yuefeng, and Zhao Chenxin became acting governor in October 2026, succeeding Wang Zhengpu.

== Administrative divisions ==
Hebei is divided into 11 prefecture-level cities. These are subdivided into 168 county-level divisions (47 districts, 21 county-level cities, 94 counties and 6 autonomous counties) and 2,207 township-level divisions (937 towns, 979 townships, 55 ethnic townships, 235 subdistricts and one district public office).

Prefecture-level divisions of Hebei
Division code	Division	Area (km^{2})	Population (2020)	Seat	Districts	Counties	Autonomous counties	County-level cities
130100	Shijiazhuang	15,848	11,235,086	Chang'an District	8	11	—	3
130200	Tangshan	14,334.6	7,717,983	Lunan District	7	4	—	3
130300	Qinhuangdao	7,791.6	3,136,879	Haigang District	4	2	1	—
130400	Handan	12,066	9,413,990	Congtai District	6	11	—	1
130500	Xingtai	12,433	7,111,106	Xindu District	4	12	—	2
130600	Baoding	22,185	11,544,036	Jingxiu District	5	15	—	4
130700	Zhangjiakou	36,861.6	4,118,908	Qiaoxi District	6	10	—	—
130800	Chengde	39,513	3,354,444	Shuangqiao District	3	4	3	1
130900	Cangzhou	14,305.3	7,300,783	Yunhe District	2	9	1	4
131000	Langfang	6,417.3	5,464,087	Anci District	2	5	1	2
131100	Hengshui	8,836.9	4,212,933	Taocheng District	2	8	—	1

The largest urban areas at the 2020 census were Shijiazhuang, Tangshan, Handan and Baoding. A full table is given in List of cities in China by population.

== Demographics ==
Historical population
Year	Pop.	±% p.a.
1912	26,658,000	—
1928	31,232,000	+0.99%
1936–37	28,644,000	−1.08%
1947	28,719,000	+0.02%
1954	35,984,644	+3.27%
1964	45,687,781	+2.42%
1982	53,005,876	+0.83%
1990	61,082,439	+1.79%
2000	66,684,419	+0.88%
2010	71,854,202	+0.75%
2020	74,610,235	+0.38%
Hebei was known as Zhili until 1928. Beijing and Tianjin were part of the province until 1928; Tianjin was again part of Hebei from 1958 to 1967. Parts of the dissolved Chahar (1952) and Rehe (1955) provinces were incorporated into Hebei.

Hebei's population is overwhelmingly Han Chinese. According to the provincial government, members of 55 ethnic minorities make up 4.27% of the population; the largest minority groups are the Manchu (about 2.1 million), Hui (about 600,000) and Mongols (about 180,000). At the 2020 census there were 37,679,003 males (50.50%) and 36,931,232 females (49.50%), a sex ratio of 102.02. In 2025 the birth rate was 4.89 per 1,000 and the death rate 8.48 per 1,000, and 64.54% of residents lived in urban areas.

=== Religion ===
Religion in Hebei (Note: Data from the Chinese General Social Survey of 2009 and the Chinese Spiritual Life Survey of 2007, as compiled by Xiuhua Wang (2015). Wang reported only the shares of Christians and of people practising ancestor veneration; the share of Muslims comes from a separate 2010 survey. Other religions are included in the residual category.)
1. Deity worshippers, Taoists, Buddhists, Confucians, folk religious sects, or not religious (90.6%)
2. Chinese ancestral religion (5.52%)
3. Christianity (3.05%)
4. Islam (0.82%)

The predominant religious traditions in Hebei are Chinese folk religion, Taoism and Chinese Buddhism. Surveys conducted in 2007 and 2009 found that 5.52% of the population practised ancestor veneration and 3.05% identified as Christian, most of them Catholic. A 2010 survey put the Muslim share of the population at 0.82%. The folk religious sect Zailiism originated in Hebei, and during the Qing dynasty local deity cults organised benevolent societies, partly in reaction to the spread of Catholicism.

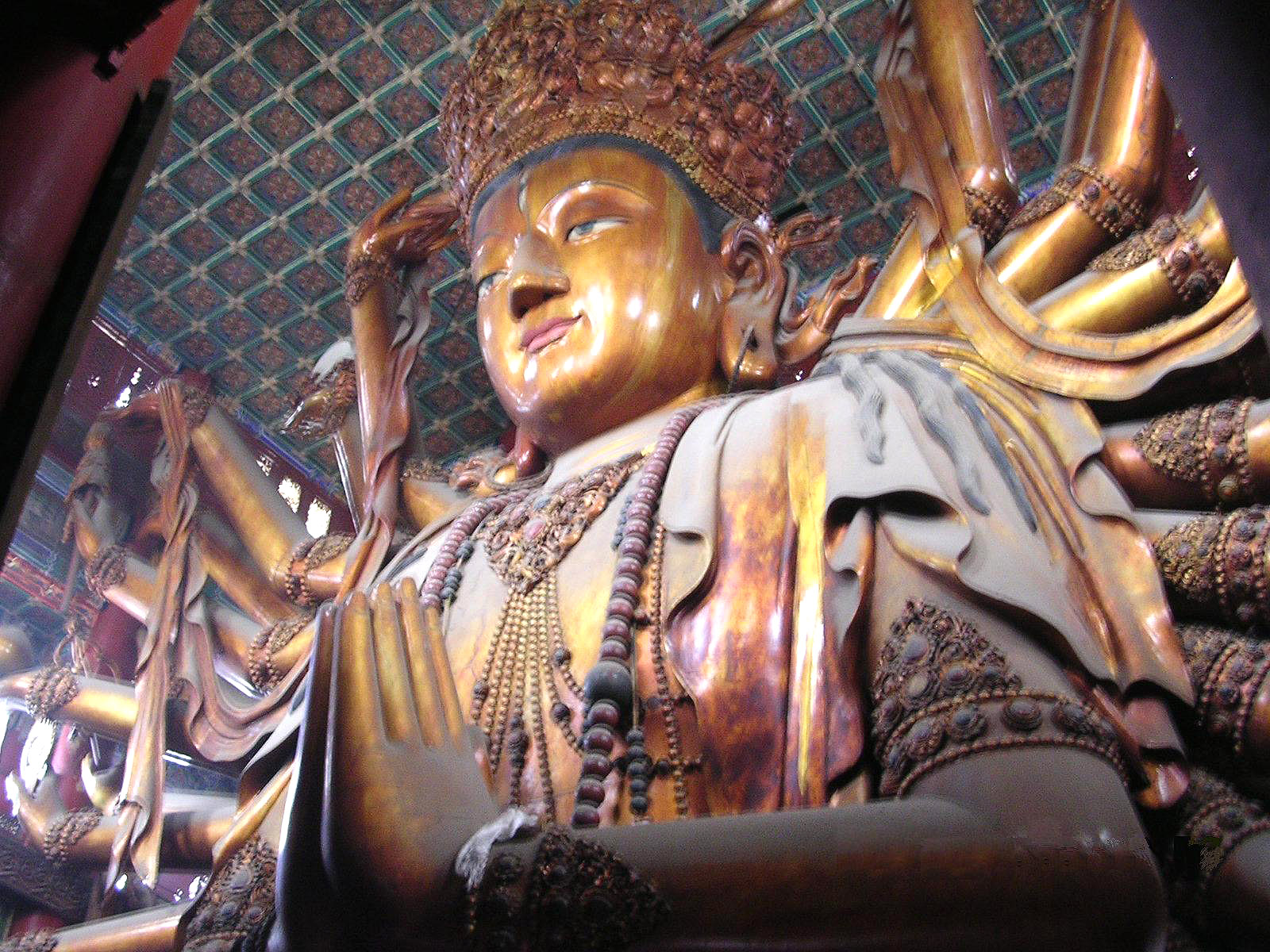
The giant Bodhisattva statue of Puning Temple

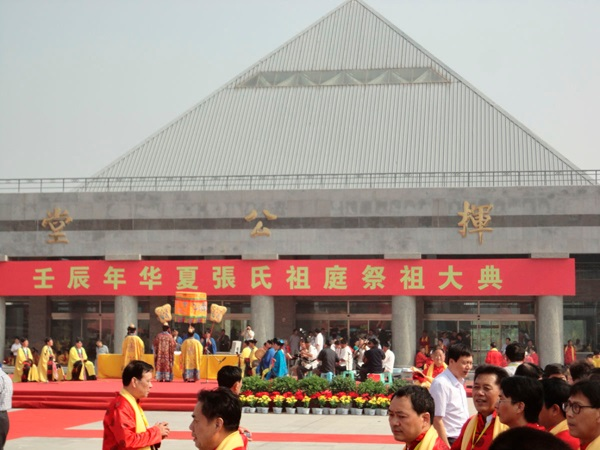
Great Temple of Zhang Hui, the central ancestral shrine of the Zhang lineage, in Qinghe

Hebei has the largest Catholic community of any Chinese province, estimated at between one and 1.5 million people. The village of Donglu near Baoding, where an apparition of the Virgin Mary was reported in 1900, is regarded as a stronghold of the unofficial Catholic Church.

== Economy ==
Hebei is one of northern China's main industrial provinces, with an economy shaped by its heavy-industry base and its position around Beijing and Tianjin; by national standards, however, its income per head is relatively low. In 2025 its gross domestic product was 4.931 trillion yuan, up 5.6% on the previous year, and GDP per capita was 66,936 yuan. The primary sector (agriculture, forestry and fisheries) contributed 451.5 billion yuan, the secondary sector (industry and construction) 1.762 trillion yuan and the tertiary sector (services) 2.717 trillion yuan, shares of 9.2%, 35.7% and 55.1% respectively.

Mining and heavy industry are central to the economy. Hebei has been China's largest steel-producing province for many years: in 2020 it produced nearly 250 million tonnes of crude steel, 23.7% of the national total, and in 2022, 212 million tonnes. Other important industries include coal and iron ore mining, petroleum refining, chemicals, ceramics, power generation, food processing and textiles. The Kailuan coal mines in Tangshan, whose operator was founded in 1878, are among China's oldest modern mines and remain in production; the Kailuan Group produced 27.91 million tonnes of raw coal in 2018. Iron ore is mined around Handan and Qian'an, supplying nearby steelworks, and part of the North China Oilfield lies in the province.

Agriculture remains significant, and much of Hebei's output supplies Beijing and Tianjin. The main crops are wheat, maize, millet and sorghum, and cotton, peanuts, soybeans and sesame are grown as cash crops. Economic zones in the province include the Xiong'an New Area, the Baoding and Shijiazhuang high-technology industrial development zones, and the Qinhuangdao economic and technological development zone.

== Culture ==
=== Language ===
Most people in Hebei speak varieties of Mandarin, largely belonging to the Jilu Mandarin subgroup. Along the western border with Shanxi, local dialects are distinct enough that linguists classify them as Jin Chinese. Hebei dialects are generally similar to the Beijing dialect, on which Standard Chinese is based, but differ from it in some respects, such as the treatment of words that had the entering tone in Middle Chinese.

=== Performing arts ===
Traditional forms of Chinese opera in Hebei include Pingju, Hebei Bangzi (Hebei clapper opera) and the Kuaiban Dagu of Cangzhou. Pingju, which uses everyday vernacular that audiences find easy to follow, emerged in the late 19th century in the marketplaces of Tianjin and Tangshan, and drew on Hebei Bangzi and Peking opera.

=== Ceramics ===
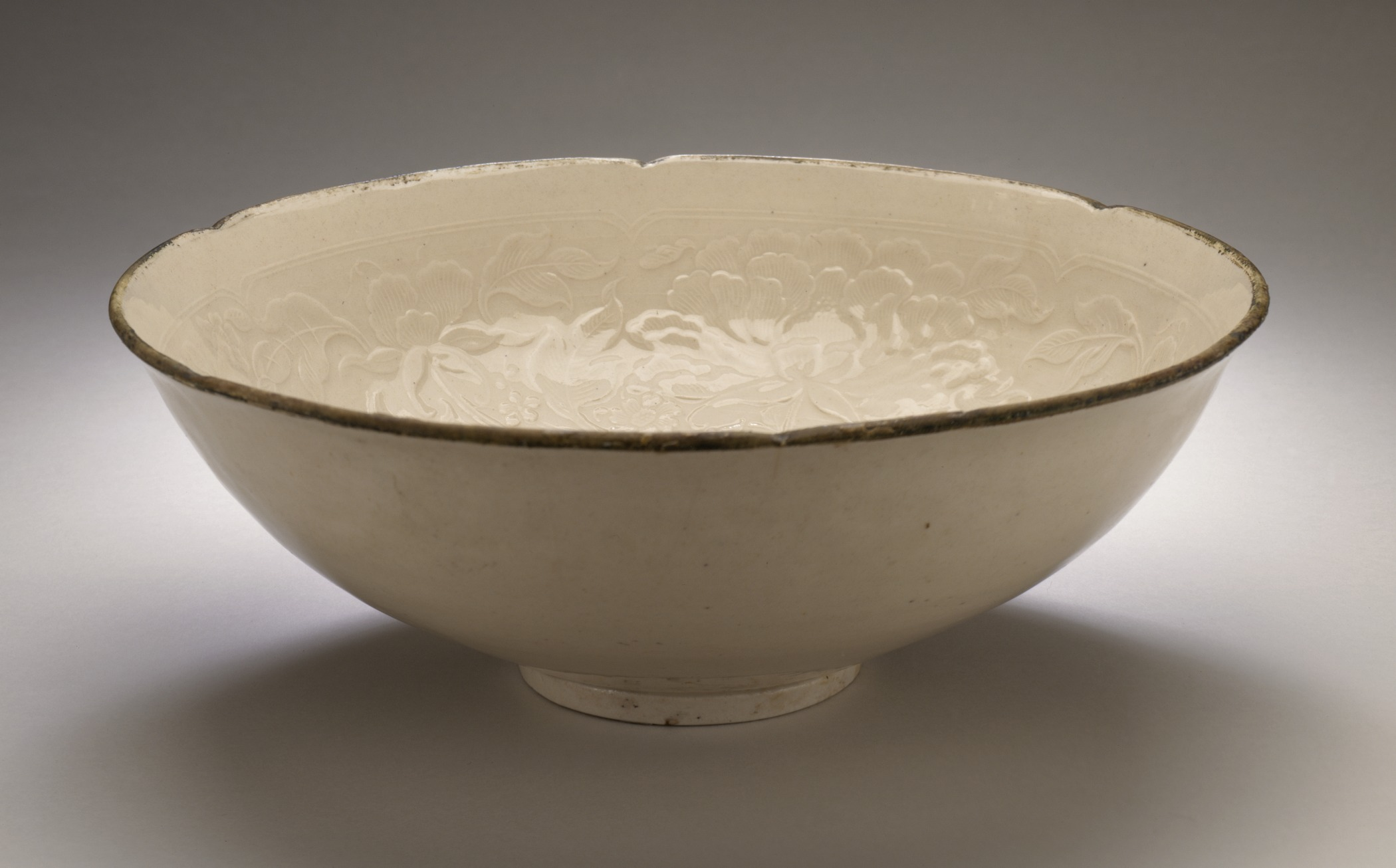
A Ding ware bowl

Quyang County in central Hebei was the centre of production of Ding ware, a white-glazed ceramic made from the Tang dynasty onwards; during the Northern Song the kilns occasionally supplied the imperial court. Ding ware includes bowls, plates, vases, cups and figurines, typically with an ivory-toned glaze.

=== Cuisine ===
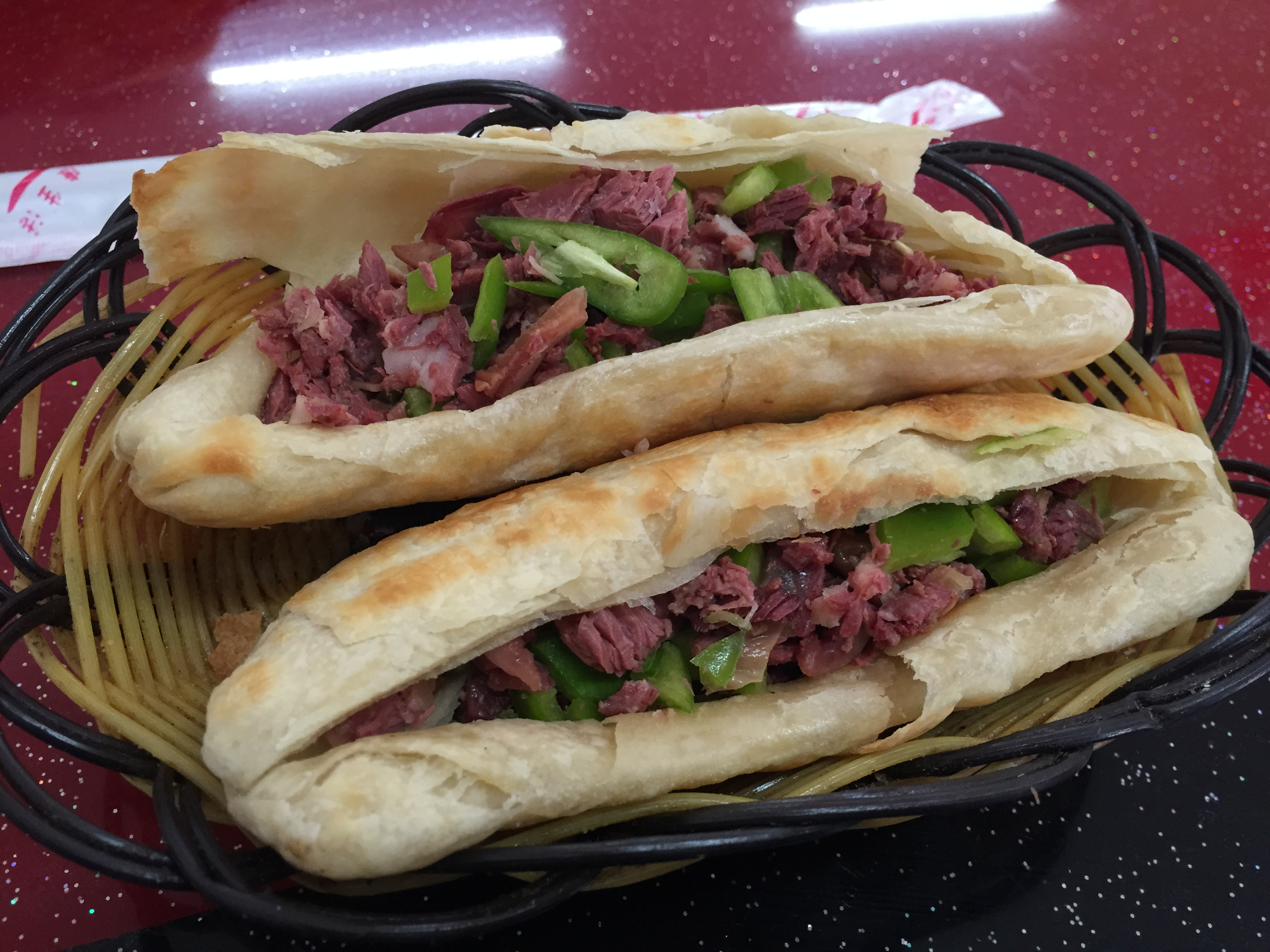
Hejian-style donkey burger

Hebei cuisine is based largely on wheat, mutton and beans. The donkey burger, whose origin is claimed by both Baoding and Hejian in Cangzhou, is the province's best-known dish; the Baoding version uses a round bun and the Hejian version a rectangular one. Local varieties of shaobing are also common.

== Heritage and tourism ==
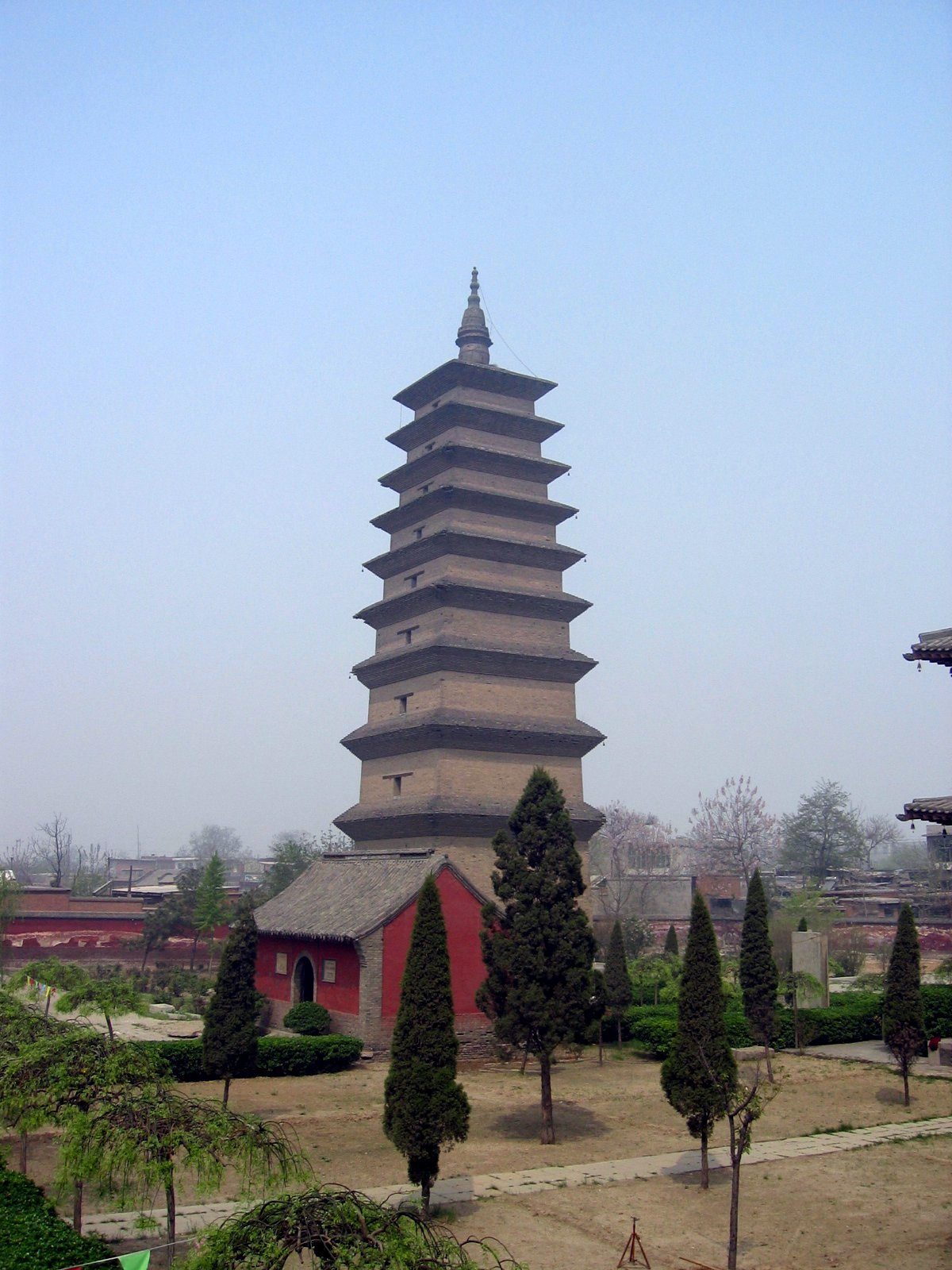
Xumi Pagoda in Zhengding, built in AD 636

Hebei contains all or part of four UNESCO World Heritage Sites. The Ming Great Wall crosses the north of the province and meets the sea at Shanhai Pass near Qinhuangdao. In 1644 the Ming general Wu Sangui, who commanded the pass, allied with the Manchus against the rebel Li Zicheng, opening the way for the Qing dynasty to take Beijing (see Battle of Shanhai Pass).

The Chengde Mountain Resort and its outlying temples, built between 1703 and 1792 as the summer residence of the Qing emperors, consist of a palace complex, a large park with lakes, pavilions and causeways, and a ring of Tibetan Buddhist and Han Chinese temples. The Qing imperial tombs at Zunhua (Eastern Qing tombs) and Yi County (Western Qing tombs) were inscribed in 2000 as part of the Imperial Tombs of the Ming and Qing Dynasties. The section of the Grand Canal passing through Cangzhou and Hengshui forms part of the Grand Canal World Heritage Site.

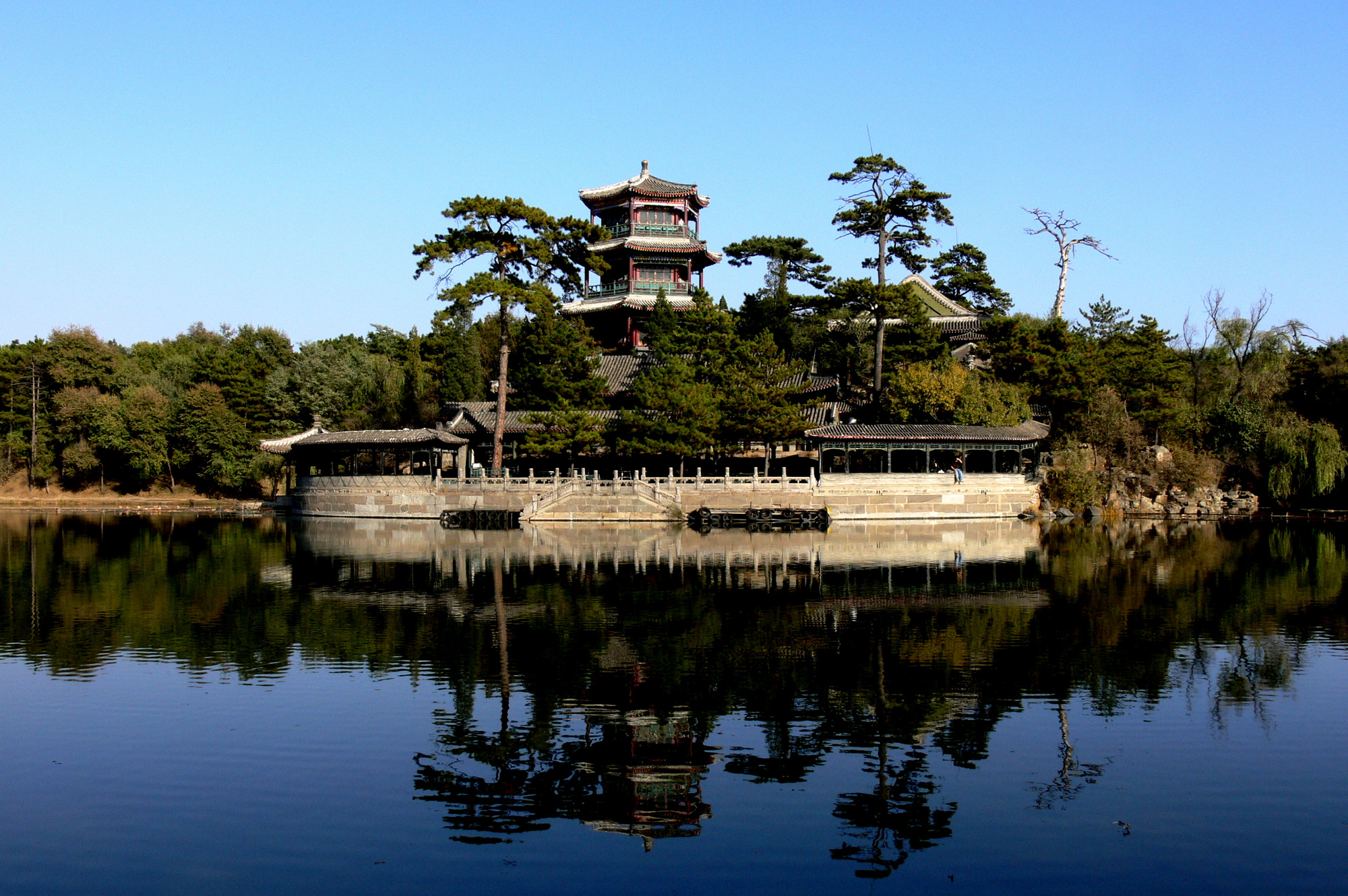
Chengde Mountain Resort

The province's six National Famous Historical and Cultural Cities are Chengde, Baoding, Zhengding, Handan, Shanhaiguan and Yu County, the last added in 2018. Baoding, the former provincial capital, preserves the residence of the Viceroy of Zhili. The Zhaozhou Bridge in Zhao County, built around 605 by Li Chun during the Sui dynasty, is the oldest standing bridge in China and the oldest open-spandrel stone arch bridge in the world.

Xibaipo, a village in Pingshan County about 90 km (56 mi) from Shijiazhuang, was the principal headquarters of the CCP leadership during the final stage of the Chinese Civil War, until March 1949, and is now a memorial site and museum. The seaside resort of Beidaihe, near Qinhuangdao, is a traditional summer retreat for China's senior leaders.

== Sports ==
Chengde hosted the 2018 Women's Bandy World Championship, played on natural ice at the Mountain Resort from 9 to 13 January 2018. Professional football clubs from the province have included Hebei F.C. and Cangzhou Mighty Lions F.C. Baoding is known for Baoding balls, metal balls used for hand exercise and relaxation.

== Education ==
Hebei's institutions of higher education include Hebei University in Baoding, Hebei Normal University, Hebei Medical University and Hebei University of Science and Technology in Shijiazhuang, and Yanshan University in Qinhuangdao. North China Electric Power University, which is administered by the national Ministry of Education, has a campus in Baoding, and Hebei University of Technology, although run by the provincial government, is located in neighbouring Tianjin. Several institutions are run by other national agencies, including the Chinese People's Armed Police Force Academy and the North China Institute of Science and Technology.

== Transport ==
=== Rail ===
Shijiazhuang Metro is the province's only operating rapid transit system; a metro is planned for Xiong'an. Hebei lies on several of China's main conventional trunk railways, including the Beijing–Guangzhou, Beijing–Kowloon, Beijing–Shanghai, Beijing–Harbin and Beijing–Baotou lines.

Since 2014, high-speed and intercity rail has expanded rapidly under the Jing-Jin-Ji integration strategy. Total high-speed line length in the Beijing–Tianjin–Hebei region grew from 1,284 km at the end of 2013 to 2,675 km at the end of 2025. By 2022 Hebei had opened more than 800 km of high-speed line in eight years, and every prefecture-level city was served by high-speed rail. Major lines include the Beijing–Zhangjiakou high-speed railway (2019), built for the 2022 Winter Olympics and the world's first 350 km/h line to use automatic train operation; the Beijing–Xiong'an intercity railway (2020), linking Beijing and Daxing Airport with Xiong'an; the Beijing–Tangshan intercity railway (2022); and the Xiong'an–Shangqiu high-speed railway, a 552 km (343 mi) section of the Beijing–Hong Kong corridor running through central and southern Hebei, which opened on 28 September 2026. In January 2026 a loop service began linking Beijing, Baoding, Xiong'an, Tianjin and Daxing Airport. The Xiong'an–Xinzhou high-speed railway to Shanxi and a Shijiazhuang–Xiong'an line are under construction, with completion planned for 2027 and 2028 respectively.

=== Roads ===
Hebei's expressway network grew rapidly in the 21st century, and in January 2026 its total length passed 9,000 kilometres (5,600 mi).

=== Air ===
Shijiazhuang Zhengding International Airport is the province's main airport, with domestic and international flights. Beijing Daxing International Airport lies on the border between Beijing and Langfang.

=== Ports ===
Hebei's ports on the Bohai Sea include Qinhuangdao, Jingtang in Tangshan, and Huanghua. Together they handled about 1.45 billion tonnes of cargo in 2025. Qinhuangdao is China's largest coal trans-shipment port.

== Media ==
Hebei Television (HEBTV) broadcasts province-wide, and Shijiazhuang Radio and Television serves the provincial capital. The Hebei Daily Newspaper Group publishes the province's three main newspapers: Hebei Daily, Yanzhao Metropolis Daily and Yanzhao Evening News.

== Notable people ==
- Jing Ke (died 227 BC), retainer of Crown Prince Dan of Yan who attempted to assassinate the future Qin Shi Huang
- Qin Shi Huang (259–210 BC), founder of the Qin dynasty and first emperor of a unified China, traditionally said to have been born in Handan
- Zhang Fei (died 221) and Zhao Yun (died 229), generals of the late Eastern Han dynasty and Three Kingdoms period
- Zu Chongzhi (429–500), mathematician and astronomer who calculated pi to an accuracy not surpassed for nearly a thousand years
- Feng Dao (882–954), chief minister under several Five Dynasties regimes, who sponsored the first printed edition of the Confucian classics
- Yan Yuan (1635–1704), Confucian philosopher
- Zhao Lirong (1928–2000), Pingju performer and actress
- Jizi (1942–2015), ink painter
- Zheng Yuanjie (born 1955), children's author
- Guo Jingjing (born 1981), Olympic champion diver
- Zhao Liying (born 1987), actress

== International relations ==
Hebei has established sister-province relationships with the following subdivisions:

- Athens, Greece (2002)
- Buenos Aires Province, Argentina (1992)
- East Flanders, Belgium (1991)
- Goiás, Brazil (1999)
- Hauts-de-Seine, France (1997)
- Iowa, United States (1983)
- Leningrad Oblast, Russia (1992)
- Missouri, United States (1994)
- Nagano Prefecture, Japan (1983)
- Pest County, Hungary (2015)
- South Chungcheong Province, South Korea (1994)
- Tottori Prefecture, Japan (1986)
- Veneto, Italy (1988)

== See also ==
- Dahe Solar Park
- List of prisons in Hebei
- Major national historical and cultural sites in Hebei
