= Dahe Solar Park =

Photovoltaic power station in Hebei, China

Jiayuguan Solar Park
- Country: China
- Location: Dahe Town, Zhangjiakou City, Hebei Province
- Coordinates: 41°04′N 114°23′E
- Status: Operational
- Commission date: 2012

Solar farm
- Type: Flat-panel PV

Power generation
- Units operational: 157,800
- Nameplate capacity: 40 MW
- Annual net output: 61.448 GWh

The Dahe Solar Park is a 40 MWp photovoltaic power station located in Dahe Town, Zhangjiakou City, Hebei Province, China. It uses fixed tilt arrays. 37 MW are from polysilicon arrays, 1 MW is from monocrystalline silicon, 1 MW is from monocrystalline back contact SPR-320E-WHTD arrays from SunPower and 1 MW is from thin film. A 20 MW storage system consists of batteries capable of storing a total of 63 MWh, to allow better use of the generated electricity.

== See also ==
- List of photovoltaic power stations
- Photovoltaic power station
- Photovoltaics
