= Yanzhao Evening News =

Simplified Chinese newspaper

Yanzhao Evening Post
- Type: Daily newspaper
- Founded: 1988
- Language: Simplified Chinese
- Headquarters: Shijiazhuang
- City: China
- OCLC number: 868947198
- Website: yzwb.sjzdaily.com.cn

Yanzhao Evening News or Yanzhao Wanbao (simplified Chinese: 燕赵晚报; traditional Chinese: 燕趙晚報; pinyin: Yānzhào wǎnbào), also known as Yanzhao Evening Post, is a tabloid newspaper published in Shijiazhuang, capital of Hebei Province, China. Its predecessor was Shijiazhuang Evening Post (石家庄晚报), which was launched on January 1, 1988, and ceased publication at the end of 1989.

Yanzhao Evening Post, sponsored by the Shijiazhuang Daily Agency (石家庄日报社), is the earliest evening newspaper in Hebei. Focused on the daily life of Shijiazhuang citizens, the newspaper is very popular for its sports and entertainment report. It is mainly circulated in city areas and 17 counties belonging to Shijiazhuang. These days, the paper can be bought in 11 cities of Hebei, but the quantity is still small.

The main competitor of Yanzhao Evening Post is Yanzhao Metropolis Daily, a tabloid published all 11 cities of Hebei.
