= Hebei delegation to the National People's Congress =

Hebei Delegation to the National People's Congress
- 全国人民代表大会河北省代表团
- Delegation for the National People's Congress
- Map showing the location of Hebei Province
- Electoral unit: Hebei Province
- Population: 74,610,235

Current Delegation
- Created: 1954
- Seats: 123
- Head of delegation: Ni Yuefen
- Provincial People's Congress: Hebei Provincial People's Congress

The Hebei delegation to the National People's Congress is a delegation composed of deputies representing Hebei Province within the National People's Congress (NPC), the supreme organ of state power of the People's Republic of China. NPC deputies from the Hebei Province are officially elected by the Hebei Provincial People's Congress.

== List of deputies ==
Year	NPC sessions	Deputies	Number of deputies	Ref.
1954	1st	Yu Xuezhong, Yuan Xing, Wang Yunsheng, Wang Kun, Wang Baozhen, Wang Dehou, Wang Dezi, Ping Jiesan, Tian Xiujuan, Tian Hua, Tian Demin, Shi Zhiren, Rong Guanxiu, Wu Wentao, Wu Yunshan, Li Peizhi, Li Guojun, Li Fenglan, Li Dequan, Lin Tie, Zan Ling, Miao Fenggang, Sun Wenshu, Geng Changsuo, Ma Zhuozhou, Ma Zisheng, Ma John, Ma Wanshui, Gao Shuxun, Zhang Linzhi, Zhang Su, Zhang Lisheng, Zhang Yan, Chen Hansheng, Zeng San, Cheng Yanqiu, Yang Xiufeng, Ge Buhai, Dong Xin, Rong Gaotang, Zhen Rongdian, Qi Yanming, Liu Baiyu, Liu Xianzhou, Liu Qingyang, Liu Guanyi, Liu Baozhong, Liu Lantao, Cai Shubin, Xue Xun, Lan Gongwu, Luo Ruiqing	52	
1959	2nd	Yu Xuezhong, Wan Xiaotang, Wang Ligeng, Wang Guangying, Wang Wei, Wang Yunsheng, Wang Kun (female), Wang Guoquan, Wang Guofan, Wang Dezi, Wang Zehua, Wang Heshou, Shi Zhiren, Lu Yuwen, Tian Xiujuan (female), Liu Zihou, Liu Changfu, Liu Baiyu, Liu Xianzhou, Liu Xiufeng, Liu Baozhong, Liu Chijun, Liu Qingyang (female), Liu Lantao, Qi Yanming, Rong Guanxiu (female), Sun Guizhen (female), Zhu Xianyi, Zhu Mengsu, Zhu Jisheng, Li Yong, Li Zhaozhen (female), Li Guojun, Li Zhuchen, Li Gengtao, Li Peizhi (female), Li Fenglan (female) Li Jiebo, Li Zhizhong, Li Dequan (female), Chen Hansheng, Wu Wentao, Wu Yunshan, Gu Xiaobo, Lin Tie, Zhang Qingchun, Zhang Su, Zhang Guozhong, Zhang Guofan, Zhang Yan, Zhang Xiangtong, Zhang Lisheng, Meng Mumu, Luo Yuchuan, Jin Zhifu, Zhou Shutao, Qiu Guanghe, Rong Gaotang, Yu Aifeng (female), Zan Ling, Hou Baozheng, Gao Shuxun, Geng Changsuo, Ma Wanshui, Ma Zhuozhou, Ma Yanxiang, Ma Sicong, Ma John, Xi Zhanyuan, Xu Xin (female), Zhang Jinyi, Kang Xiumin, Xiao Changhua, Tao Menghe, Yang Shixian, Yang Fuqing, Yang Xiufeng, Yang Yumin, Yang Liying (female), Qian Jiaguang, Bo Yibo, Tan Zhen	82	
1964	3rd	Ding Xuhuai, Yu Zhonghan, Yu Zhiyuan, Wan Xiaotang, Ma John, Ma Zhuozhou, Ma Guorui, Ma Yanxiang, Ma Wentian, Ma Sicong, Ma Ruizeng, Fang Xianzhi, Fang Huang, Wang Zhixi, Wang Kangzhi, Wang Yunsheng, Wang Ligeng, Wang Shutang, Wang Lanxu, Wang Shourong, Wang Guangying, Wang Guangmei, Wang Tonglun, Wang Zhuquan, Wang Wei, Wang Zhiqi, Wang Yunsheng, Wang Zuomin, Wang Yeqiu, Wang Kun, Wang Guofan, Wang Shuntong, Wang Sihua, Wang Taojiang, Wang Xin, Wang Zhenduo, Wang Jian, Wang Zhi, Wang Dezi, Deng Encheng, Yin Dingfan, Yin Shan, Yin Zanxun, Feng Shiying, Feng Yi, Shi Zhiren, Lu Shan, Shen Qingrong, Shen Zhongyi, Shen Xili, Tian Jian, Tian Xiujuan, Tian Zhangwu, Liu Daben, Liu Zihou, Liu Changfu, Liu Ningyi, Liu Xianzhou, Liu Shihe, Liu Baozhong, Liu Chijun, Liu Lianyi, Liu Geping, Liu Qingyang, Liu Shuqin, Qi Yanming, Qi Zhongma, Xu Ming, Xing Yanzi, Rong Xuezhen, Rong Guanxiu, Zhu Xianyi, Zhu Jianhan, Zhu Jisheng, Zhu Kang, Zhu Mengsu, Kang Tiejun, Ruan Zhicheng, Sun Yaming, Sun Zhiyan, Sun Guizhen, Ji Yunlong, Shen Xiyong, Wang Yinren, Sha Xiaoquan, Sha Mengbi, Du Jinfang, Du Mengyong, Li Guangchen, Li Ziguang, Li Fenglan (female), Li Zhuang, Li Zhaozhen, Li Baoguang, Li Zhiqian, Li Zhizhong, Li Baitang, Li Runjie, Li Zhuchen, Li GengtaoLi Xuefeng, Li Peizhi, Li Ruishan, Li Dequan, Yang Yuwen, Yang Shixian, Yang Yizhou, Yang Fuqing, Yang Liankun, Yang Yumin, Yang Chunlin, Yang Jiafeng, Yang Liying, Yang Peisheng, Wu Wentao, Wu Zhongshu, Wu Qixiu, Wu Jie, Wu Zhongling, Wu Yunshan, Gu Dezhen, Qiu Guanghe, Qiu Zongyue, He Binglin, Zhang Shizhen, Zhang Wenyou, Zhang Hanwen, Zhang Yongqing, Zhang Yu, Zhang Benlin, Zhang Qingchun, Zhang Tongyu, Zhang Chuyang, Zhang Su, Zhang Zuotang, Zhang Ruolin, Zhang Guofan, Zhang Yan, Zhang Jieqing, Zhang Xiangtong, Zhang Haiquan, Zhang Jing, Zhang Lisheng, Zhang Shuo, Zhang Wan, Zhang Linzhi, Chen Fenggao, Chen Shunxiang, Chen Min, Chen Bojun, Chen Lu De, Chen Hansheng, Shao Qinghua, Zheng Tianting, Zheng Lianyu, Zheng Enshou, Lang Zhonglai, Wu Zhensheng, Lin Yi, Lin Tie, Lin Deshi, Yu Luoshan, Luo Yuchuan, Luo Peilin, Zhou Shutao, Zhou Haiyuan, Zhou Fuxiang, Meng Mumu, Shi Fuyan, Zu Deming, Zhao Jinsheng, Zhao Yicheng, Zhao Feng, Zhao Huilan, Zhao Lu, Zhao Xiwu, Zhao Pengfei, Hao Qingshan, Rong Gaotang, Hu Changhai, Hu Zhaoheng, Hu Yi, Yu Dejun, Yu Lüqi, Yu Aifeng, Xi Zhanyuan, Duan Fengqi, Hou Baozheng, Zan Ling, Yao Ximing, Gao Shuxun, Gao Jingying, Yuan Fuli, Geng Changsuo, Jia Guilan, Gu Yisun, Qian Jiaguang, Xu Guang, Xu Xin, Xu Hongji, Xu BowenXu Liting, Kang Xiumin, Yan Haideng, Xiao Changhua, Cao Yiou, Cui Zhuxuan, Xie Guangju, Xie Zhenya, Peng Keming, Huang Jianzhong, Dong Zizhen, Han Qimin, Cheng Fanwu, Yu Fujing, Lu Jindong, Tan Zhen, Qi Xiuhui, Zhai Xiangdong, Zhai Ying, Miao Tianrui, Pan Chengxiao, Wei Ding	223	
1975	4th	Ding Congjun, Ding Xiuhua, Ma Li, Ma Dengbao, Wang Yunlong, Wang Wenxiu, Wang Shihui, Wang Quanyou, Wang Xingtong, Wang Zhiqi, Wang Xiuyun, Wang Yu, Wang Yingjun, Wang Yiyuan, Wang Shuqin, Wang Xizhen, Yin Fengchen, Ye Yingfen, Tian Zhangwu, Bai Qixian, Feng Yuming, Ning Qianhe, Rong Guanxiu, Lü Yulan, Qiao Fengwang, Ren Guilian, Liu Zihou, Liu Fengchao, Liu Yuzhang, Liu Yuxia, Liu Tingyin, Liu Xingzhou, Liu Jingcai, Liu Shuxun, Liu Jiquan, An Zhenhai, Xu Jiaxin, Sun Changlan, Sun Lianheng, Sun Xi, Li Dacheng, Li Wenxiang, Li Rongzhen, Li Zhu, Li Guilan, Li Jingyan, Yang Zhihe, Yang Guodong Yang Zongqin, Yang Baoxiang, Wu Zhongshu, Shen Wenying, Song Xinru, Zhang Ziming, Zhang Wenxing, Zhang Yuqian, Zhang Benlin, Zhang Xiuling, Zhang Yan, Zhang Shufeng, Zhang Guien, Zhang Qiuju, Chen Li, Chen Yougui, Chen Linfa, Chen Suqin, Chen Zhe, Luo Chengde, Zhu Wanxiu, Zhou Jinlan, Zhou Bingzhong, Zhao Yu'e, Zhao Gailian, Zhao Yingmei, Hu Changhai, Hu Zhihong, Hou Yinhui, Jin Guixiang, Jia Zhantong, Gao Yueqin, Gao Jianxian, Gao Desheng, Huang Caijie, Cao Xiurong, Kang Dehou, Yan Zhentang, Dong Zongai, Han Yongjiu, Jiao Shengwen, Xie Xiankui, Xie Shengtang, Lei Shunian, Fan Deling, Pan Chengxiao, Pan Shanxu, Huo Manzhen	96	
1978	5th	Ding Cunyou, Ma Yuying, Ma Shiliang, Ma Zhijie, Ma Dianchen, Wang Shuqin, Wang Yushan, Wang Shirong, Wang Shihui, Wang Quanyou, Wang Zhi, Wang Yunsheng, Wang Yu, Wang Wujing, Wang Yingjun, Wang Xianzhu, Wang Sumei, Wang Jian, Wang Yiyuan, Wang Changbai, Wang Shuzhen, Yin Zanxun, Lu Jinqiao, Lu Hexuan, Tian Jian, Shi Tiesuo, Feng Yuming, Feng Jianzhang, Feng Xiyin, Xing Zhuo, Rong Guanxiu, Lü Yulan, Zhu Hongchang, Zhu Lizhi, Ren Xianru, Liu Zihou, Liu Changzhen, Shi He, Liu Songlin, Liu Zhuofu, Liu Zongyao, Liu Weinian, An Qingyun, Xu Jiaxin, Xu Bin, Nong Shaohua, Ruan Zhicheng, Sun Lianheng, Sun Qicheng, Sun Defu, Du Bu Xin, Du Xiyu, Li Zhonghua, Li Rentang, Li Shule, Li Yuxiang, Li Yongjin, Li Yushi, Li Guiyu, Li Yanxia, Li Zhenfu, Li Shuying, Li Jingmin, Yang Yunying, Yang Yuzhu, Yang Guodong, Yang Ding'an, Wu Zhongshu, Wu Junliang, Wang Huzhen, Shen Wenying, Shen Qiyi, Song Xinru, Song Yanbo, Zhang Benlin, Zhang Pingjun, Zhang Qingshan, Zhang Ruolin, Zhang Jie, Zhang Jianyao, Zhang Xinxian, Zhang Weiling, Chen Yiling, Chen Yougui, Chen Xiushan, Wu Erzhen, Lin Riying, Lin Tie, Zhu Wanxiu, Jin Shixuan, Zhou Henggang, Zheng Hanzhang, Zheng Xiuling, Lang Fengzhen, Zhao Yishan, Zhao Haiyun, Hao Qingshan, Hao Miqing, Hu Guilan, Bai YulanDuan Changtai, Hou Zhanyou, Hou Yinhui, Yu Lüqi, Yao Yin, Qin Jichang, Geng Biao, Jin Guixiang, Xu Baohe, Xu Haihua, Yin Jichang, Weng Guizhen, Gao Jianxian, Gao Chenghuan, Guo Zhi, Guo Shunyuan, Guo Aini, Guo Xinke, Huang Hua, Kang Dehou, Peng Mingxia, Dong Zhongai, Han Xuetong, Han Bangju, Han Rongji, Cheng Youzhi, Xie Shengtang, Cai Kaiyang, Fan Deling, Pan Chengxiao, Huo Manzhen, Dai Jinzhu, Wei Guiyong	133	
1983	6th	Ding Yipeng, Ding Yulong, Ma Zhijie, Wang Zhanrong, Wang Zhi, Wang Lianzhu, Wang Lin, Wang Changhan, Wang Mingqi, Wang Xianzhu, Wang Zhen, Wang Delin, Yin Xiuchun, Deng Xiancan, Ai Youqin, Shen Licheng, Ye Guangcheng, Tian Yilan, Feng Zhi, Feng Jianzhang, Feng Xiyin, Lü Chuanzan, Liu Xianlin, Liu Zhaoguo, Liu Jun, Liu Bingyan, Liu Zongyao, Liu Bingcai, Liu Weilian, Liu Xinmin, Guan Chunlan, Guan Zhe, Guan Kuo, An Junying, Sun Zhiqi, Sun Shuhuan, Sun Jingwen, Sun Xiang, Du Jingbo, Li Xing, Li Min, Li Qi, Li Feng, Li Bixian, Yang Naijun, Yang Quande, Yang Jinshan, Yang Ding'an, Yang Shizhen, Yang Zhenxing, Yang Jiafeng, Yang Shurui, Wu Zhongshu, Wu Wentao, Wu Qizhi, He Guangda, Zou Liying, Sha Wenhan, Zhang Shijun, Zhang Xuzhen, Zhang Qingliang, Zhang Ruji, Zhang Xiaochun, Zhang Qingshan, Zhang Zhen, Zhang Shun, Zhang Jieqing, Zhang Qia, Zhang Bin, Zhang Yali, Chen Zhishen, Fan Xirong, Lin Zulu, Lin Meizhu, Zhou Yumei, Zhou Yuxuan, Zhou Henggang, Zhou Zhende, Zheng Jiufen, Zheng Yansu, Baoyin (Mongolian), Zhao Lanxin, Zhao Xing, Xi Guang, Jiang Hanjie, Qin Zhixin, Xia Hengxi, Xu Wenfu, Xu Shaobin, Ling Baoyin, Gao Xiangyu, Guo Yongxian, Guo Zhi, Huang Hua, Huang Junjun, Huang Lan, Cao Hengchen, Cui Yi, Tuo Shilu, Yan Guojun, Liang YuxinGe Qi, Han Xuetong, Han Peifu, Fu Ruomei, Fu Jingxin, Jiao Hong, Chu Zhuang, Zang Zhenguo, Tan Yongjie, Pan Gongping, Pan Chengxiao, Wei Jiankun	113	
1988	7th	Ding Wenbin, Yu Mingdou, Wang Youhui, Wang Quan, Wang Shouchun, Wang Changhan, Wang Minyu, Wang Shude, Niu Chuanjiang, Kong Fanxi, Ai Youqin, Shen Licheng, Tian Futing, Bai Dongzhi, Bai Lutang, Bai Shuhua, Feng Zhonghe, Ning Quanfu, Lü Chuanzan, Liu Ren, Liu Ying, Liu Zongyao, Liu Shengde, Liu Qiongfang, Guan Chunlan, Guan Kuo, Sun Wanzhong, Sun Jingwen, Su Jingbai, Li Wande, Li Changgeng, Li Zhuang, Li Cai, Li Qi, Li Dejin, Li Bixian, Yang Wanli, Yang Quande, Yang Zhenhua, Wu Qizhi, Wu Zhenqing, He Guangda, He Wenjie, He Xiangtao, Gu Xiaolin, Zhang Feng'e, Zhang Lanqiu, Zhang Xingrang, Zhang Yunling, Zhang Gensheng, Zhang Run Shen, Zhang Jingcheng, Chen Shikun, Chen Bingzhen, Chen Zhishen, Fan Wenbin, Lin Mei, Lin Xinping, Lin Ruilian, Luo Zhiling, Luo Huilan, Yue Qifeng, Zhou Jinke, Zhou Henggang, Zhou Zhende, Lang Baoxiang, Meng Xianzhang, Zhao Yulin, Zhao Yulian, Zhao Guozhong, Zhao Jinduo, Hu Shufen, Jiang Hanjie, Qin Zhixin, Geng Lijuan, Li Xiulan, Xia Hengxi, Xia Jiexin, Gu Erxiong, Xu Jinzai, Xu Ji, Gao Xiangyu, Guo Shichang, Guo Zhi, Guo Peizhen, Guo Hongqi, Tang Quanjie, Tang Shunyi, Huang Hanguang, Huang Junjun, Huang Lan, Huang Guosheng, Cao Yushan, Yan Enrong, Dong Naifang, Cheng Guangwen, Fu Ruomei, Fu Liang, Wen Yonghe, Xie ChangminLai Zaikang, Lei Jinhe, Xie Feng, Man Hengzhen, Guan Meixian, Hao Jie, Yan Huizhi, Pan Gongping, Huo Zongyi, Wei Jiankun		
1993	8th	Wang Daming, Wang Fengzhen, Wang Wenyi, Wang Bingqian, Wang Jialin, Wang Baoyin, Wang Hongzeng, Wang Xiaoguang, Wang Minyu, Wang Defang, Lu Xuesong, Shen Licheng, Ye Liansong, Bai Dongzhi, Bai Runzhang, Bai Shuhua, Feng Lanming, Ning Quanfu, Bi Youcheng, Lü Jize, Lü Chuanzan, Zhu Zhiwu, Ren Baolun, Liu Hanzhang, Liu Ren, Liu Jinyu, Liu Zongyao, Liu Yigui, Liu Jingchang, Qi Yongheng, Guan Kuo, Xu Jianhua, Sun Xiulan, Sun Wanzhong, Sun Demin, Du Shuxiang, Li Changgeng, Li Yonghuai, Li Shouling, Li Xiufen, Li Guoting, Li Bingliang, Li Shufang, Li Huisheng, Li Ruichang, Li Xinfang, Yang Guochen, Yang Zhenhua, Yang Xinnong Yang Zhaojian, Lian Zhenjing, Xiao Yulin, Wu Qizhi, He Xiangtao, Tong Zhiguang, Gu Xiaolin, Zou Benzhen, Zou Jing, Shen Zhifeng, Song Shuai, Zhang Feng'e, Zhang Wendian, Zhang Lanqiu, Zhang Qinghe, Zhang Xingrang, Zhang Yu, Zhang Yunling, Zhang Pin, Zhang Jinfen, Chen Shikun, Chen Bingzhen, Yuan Shutian, Zhou Zhende, Zhou Deman, Meng Xianzhang, Zhao Xinglin, Zhao Guozhong, Zhao Cheng, Zhao Zhenguo, Hou Zhenqing, Jiang Dianwu, Li Zhanshu, Xia Xiangxi, Xu Ji, Gao Xuexing, Guo Chengzhi, Guo Zhi, Tang Shunyi, Huang Junjun, Huang Lan, Huang Guosheng, Huang Gengchen, Huang Yan, Cui Xiang, Kang Qingde, Yan Zhixiang, Yan Enrong, Dong Naifang, Han Zhenguo, Cheng Guangwen, Cheng Youzhi, Cheng Weigao, Wen Yonghe, Xie Jinglong, Lai Zaikang, Ci Chenglu, Pan Gongping, Huo Zongyi, Mu Xiheng, Wei Jiankun		
1998	9th	Yu Tianrui, Mo Zhiyi, Ma Lancui, Ma Jiaji (Manchu), Wang Tianyi, Wang Jialin, Wang Youhui, Wang Guangming, Wang Xudong, Wang Xiuzhen, Wang Baoyin, Wang Chengxiao, Wang Baoxiang, Wang Ju, Wang Fujie, Wang Ruizhong, Wang Shaohua, Kong Dan, Long Zhuangwei (Miao), Ye Liansong, Shen Licheng, Shen Guiru, Cheng Siwei, Bi Youcheng, Qu Xiuxia, Lü Jize, Liu Wenyuan, Liu Hanzhang, Liu Jinyu, Liu Yigui, Liu Yanbin, Liu Haisheng, Liu Shumin (Hui), Liu He, Guan Fangqiu (Manchu), Tang Guohua, An Luqin, Xu Yongyue, Sun Xiulan, Li Changgeng, Li Yonghuai, Li Shouling, Li Xiufen (Hui), Li Baoyuan, Li Jianchang, Li Junqu, Li Bingliang, Li Enfu, Yang Qian, Wu Yantian, Wu De Xin, He Wenjie, He Xingshen, He Xiangtao, Tong Zhiguang, Tong Shuyun (Manchu), Wang Lijuan (Manchu), Zhang Yujiang, Zhang Qinghua, Zhang Yunling, Zhang Zhixue, Zhang He, Zhang Baoyi, Zhang Qiuyang, Zhang Huanyu (Manchu), Zhang Xinjian, Zhang Jing, Zhang Zhenhuan, Chen Shi, Chen Bingzhen, Fan Meili, Shang Jinsuo, Luo Quanzhong, Jin Zhongming (Manchu), Zhou Zhende, Zheng Yuxiang, Meng Xianzhang, Zhao Jun, Zhao Guozhong, Zhao Zhenguo (Hui), Zhao Tielian, Zhao Dianxuan, Zhao Deping, Hu Guangbao, Yao Shiwei, Niu Maosheng (Manchu), Yu Zeyou, Wen Zhikuan (Hui), Hong Tianmin, Yao Xiaoyao, Yao Xixian, Qin Chaozhen, Jin Xincui, Jia Tixin, Xia Hengxi, Xu Dunxin, Xu Ji, Yin Bingxu, Guo ChengzhiGuo Ziran, Guo Jianmo, Guo Haixiu, Guo Demin, Tang Shunyi, Cao Baohua, Cui Xiang, Kang Qingde, Yan Wenbin, Yan Enrong, Dong Peicheng, Han Shengyu, Han Zhenguo, Han Baozhen, Cheng Youzhi, Cheng Weigao, Fu Guiwu (Mongolian), Pu Tianhui, Lai Zaikang, Xie Renyi, Cai Dongchen		
2003	10th	Yu Yingtai, Mo Zhiyi, Ma Yinglin, Wang Tianyi, Wang Yazhou (Mongolian), Wang Zixiu, Wang Xiuzhen (female), Wang Junqing, Wang Kunshan, Wang Jinzhong, Wang Jianjun, Wang Shubo, Wang Baolin, Wang Hengqin, Wang Ju (female), Wang Chao, Wang Fuqiang, Shi Guangsheng, Long Zhuangwei (Miao), Lu Ruigang, Shen Guiru (female), Bai Keming, Bai Junjie, Cong Bin, Feng Wenhai, Xing Rongli, Xing Denghua, Cheng Siwei, Qu Xiuxia (female), Liu Daqun, Liu Rujun, Liu Zuotian, Liu Xiguang, Liu Mingzhong, Liu Jinyu (female), Sun Daye, Yan Jinhu, Li Changgeng, Li Guangzhen, Li Shouling, Li Bing (female), Li Baoyuan, Li Zhenjiang, Li Xiaoen, Li Ping (female), Li Yunqi, Yang Zhong, Xiao Yutian, Wu Xianguo, Wu Zhenshan, Wu Dexin (female), He Wenjie He Xingshen, He Xiangtao, Tong Weidong (Manchu), Tong Shuyun (female, Manchu), Zou Xiaoshan (female), Wang Lijuan (female, Manchu), Shen Xiaoping, Zhang Li, Zhang Chengqi, Zhang Zhixiang, Zhang Zhixue, Zhang He, Zhang Junling (female), Zhang Hongyi, Zhang Weiye, Chen Xiaobing (female), Chen Bingzhen (female), Chen Xiuli (female), Shao Xizhen (female), Wu Sihai (Hui), Fan Xianguo, Shang Jinsuo, Ji Yunshi, Jin Baolong (Hui), Zhou Shan, Zhou Zhende, Lang Guoping, Zhao Jun, Zhao Dianxuan, Hu Guangbao, Liu Baocheng, Xin Chunying (female), Yu Dinghai, He Guoying, Yuan Dabing, Yuan Shizhen, Yuan Xingpei, Yuan Miaozhi (female), Yuan Shumei (female), Geng Jianming, Jin Xincui (female), Jia Tixin (female), Xu Xiaoli, Gao Jinhao, Guo Wenxiang (female)Guo Chengzhi, Guo Hua, Guo Gengmao, Guo Shuqin (female), Guan Ruiting, Cao Baohua, Chang Yuzhen (female), Kang Qingde, Dong Peicheng, Han Yuchen, Han Shengyu, Han Qingmei (female, Hui nationality), Han Ronghua (female), Han Baozhen (female), Jing Chunhua, Jin Baofang, Xie Renyi, Dou Shuhua, Cai Dongchen, Zang Shengye, Liao Bo, Tan Xiuling (female), Ji Chuntang, Wei Zhimin		
2008	11th	Ding Wanming (Manchu), Ding Liguo, Ding Ran (female, Hui), Ding Qiang, Yu Qun, Yao Zhiyi, Wang Yifang, Wang Feng, Wang Fengying (female), Wang Zhigang, Wang Xiuzhen (female), Wang Sheping, Wang Xuehong (female, Mongolian), Wang Xueqiu, Wang Baoshan, Wang Hengqin, Wang Zhenhua, Wang Aimin, Wang Chao, Wang Huiwen, Wang Dejin, Ge Jianhua, Fang Jianping, Yin Guangjun (Hui), Tian Zhiping, Shi Shue (female), Fu Zhifang, Bai Keming, Cong Bin, Bi Jianguo, Zhu Zhengju, Zhu Shouchen, Zhu Haowen, Liu Daqun, Liu Yandong (female), Liu Rujun, Liu Zhixin (Manchu), Liu Mingzhong, Liu Xueku, Liu Zhenhua, Qi Xuchun (Manchu), Guan Min (female, Manchu), Qi Wanli, Xu Heying (female), Sun Jimu, Su Shifeng, Li Baoyuan, Li Chunsheng, Li Zu Pei, Li Zhenjiang, Li Ganpo, Li Xiaoen, Yang Shiwu, Yang Zhong, Yang Xiuhua (female), Yang Jianzhong, Yang Xuegang, He Xiaowei, Yu Zhengui (Hui), Zou Xiaoshan (female), Xin Shuhua (female), Xin Baoshan, Wang Xiuli (female), Wang Kang, Shen Xiaoping, Song Furu, Zhang Yunchuan, Zhang Gujiang, Zhang Zhigang, Zhang Xueqing, Zhang Jianheng, Zhang Junling (female), Chen Baicheng (Manchu), Chen Guoying, Chen Lianqun (female), Shao Xizhen (female), Shang Jinsuo, Zhou Tienong, Zheng Xuebi, Fang Hui (female), Zhao Linming, Zhao Guoling, Zhao Zhihai, Zhao Baoqin, Liu Baoquan, Liu Baocheng, Duan Tieli, Xin Chunying (female), Hou Erhe, Jiang Deguo, He Guoying, Yuan Miaozhi (female), Yuan Shumei (female), Geng Jianming, Jia Tixin (female), Jia Chunmei (female), Qian Zongfei,Gao Hongzhi, Guo Chengzhi, Guo Gengmao, Guo Shuqin (female), Huang Jianhua, Huang Rong, Xiao Yutian, Cao Baohua, Chang Yuzhen (female), Yan Shengke, Peng Xuefeng, Han Yuchen, Han Qingmei (female, Hui), Han Ronghua (female), Jin Lingzhan (female), Jin Baofang, Zhan Furui (Manchu), Cai Dongchen, Cai Dekuan, Liao Bo, Pan Xiufen (female), Xue Jilian, Ji Chuntang, Wei Zhimin		
2013	12th	Yu Guiliang, Mo Zhiyi, Ma Yufeng, ~~Wang Yifang~~, Wang Fengying (female), Wang Wenzhong, Wang Gang, Wang Zhigang, Wang Qijiang, Wang Chang, Wang Jinliang, Wang Xueqiu, Wang Baoshan, Wang ~~Chao~~, Wang Zengli, Fang Liping (female), Fang Jianping, Shi Kerong, Long Zhuangwei (Miao), Lu Qingguo, ~~Shi Shue~~ (female), Fu Shuangjian, Cong Bin, Bian Faji, Xing Guohui, Bi Jianguo, Zhu Liqiu (female), Zhu Shouchen, Zhu Haowen, Liu Daqun, Liu Yandong (female), Liu Mingzhong, Liu Baosheng, Liu Chunxiang (female, Hui), Yan Liying (female), Yan Guanghua (female), Mi Bohua, An Jian, Qi Wanli, Sun Wenzhong, Sun Jimu, Du Qingshen, Li Xiaoting (female), Li Changgeng, Li Zhaoting, Li Zhijian, Li Liangui, Li Shenming, Li Huai, Li Yanjun, Li Zhenjiang, Li Zengqi, Yang Xiuhua (Female), Yang Jianzhong, Yang Xuegang, Yang Chongyong (Manchu), Yang Xinli (female), Yang Hui, Wu Zhenshan, Yu Weiping, Leng Jiying (female), Song Enhua, Song Furu, Zhang Yunchuan, Zhang Fengmei (female), Zhang Wenhui, Zhang Qingwei, Zhang Qingli, Zhang Rucai, Zhang Lixia (female, Hui), Zhang Jianheng, Zhang Shufen (female), Zhang Fumin (Manchu), Zhang Fuli, Chen Guoying, Chen Zhimin (female), Shao Xizhen (female), Fan Xianguo, Shang Jinsuo, Ming Hai, Jin Chunmei (female, Manchu), Meng Lanzhi (female), Zhao Fenglou, Zhao Yujiang, Zhao Zhihai, Zhao Yong, Zhao Shuguang (Manchu), Hu Ling (female), Ha Mingjiang (Hui), Duan Tieli, Xin Chunying (female), Hou Huamei (female), Hou Liang, Jiang Deguo, Zhu Shuchai (female), Yuan Hongmei (female), Nie Ruiping,Jia Chunmei (female), Jia Jinzhong, Qian Zongfei, Gao Hongzhi, Gao Shuzhen (female), Gao Ruihua (female, Manchu), Guo Yunpeng, Guo Jianren, Guo Shuqin (female), Huang Gang, Xiao Yutian, Cao Baohua, Liang Weijian, Ge Huibo, Han Wenchen, Han Yuchen, Cheng Zhenwei, ~~Jiao~~ Yanlong, Wen Xiuling (female), Jin Lingzhan (female), Jin Baofang, Zhan Furui (Manchu), Chu Xianying, Cai Dongchen, Cai Zhansheng, Zhai Zhihai, Huo Xingwen, Wei Shaojun, Wei Zhimin		
2018	13th	Ding Xiufeng, Yu Yong, Yu Pusong, Qi Guoyan (female), Wei Yanming, Ma Yongping (female, Hui), Ma Jiayou, Wang Fengqiao (female), Wang Fengying (female), Wang Dongfeng, Wang Litong, Wang Gang, Wang Lianling (female), Wang Lianzeng, Wang Huning, Wang Shuhua, Wang Feng, You Lizeng, Fang Jinhua (female), Fang Jianping, Yin Liyun (female), ~~Deng Peiran~~, Long Zhuangwei (Miao), Lu Qingguo, Tian Yongjun, Tian Chungang, Feng Lichao (female), Feng Jingkun (female), Lü Zhicheng, Liu Chunxiang (female, Hui), Liu Guifang (female), An Jiheng, Qi Wanli, Qi Chunfeng (Manchu), Xu Qin, Sun Baohou, Ji Qingju, Du Yanliang, Li Changgeng, Li Zhigang, Li Lihua (female), Li Shenming, Li Zheng, Li Baozhong, Li Yanping (female), Li Suhuan (female), Li Bo, Li Qiang Yang Weikun (female), ~~Yang Guozhan~~, Yang Shuan, Yang Jianyu, Yang Zhensheng, Shi Qingshuang, Wu Xiangjun, He Jinying (female), Zhang Shaoqin, Zhang Donghe, Zhang Ye, Zhang Rucai, Zhang Jun (female), Zhang Lixia (female, Hui), Zhang Limin (Manchu), Zhang Qingbin, Zhang Shufen (female), Zhang Fumin (Manchu), Zhang Ruishu, Zhang Jing (female), Chen Fengzhen (female), Chen Ping, Chen Gang, Chen Jianhua, Chen Chunfang, Chen Shubo, Chen Fuli, Shao Limin, Wu Weidong, Wu Zhiyong, Fan Zhaobing, Shang Jinsuo, Ming Hai, Zhou Wentao, Zhou Guangquan, Zhou Songbo, Zhou Shuying (female), Pang Yonghui, Zheng Yuxiao (female), Zheng Xilan (female), Meng Jianmin, Zhao Zhihai, Hao Junhai, Rong Jiuhua, Ha Mingjiang (Hui), Hou Erhe, Hou Huamei (female), Zhu Shuchai (female), Yuan Hongmei(Female), Yuan Tongli, Chai Huien (female), Dang Xiaolong, Ni Haiqiong, Xu Zuo, Xu Jianhua, Guo Jianren, Guo Jianying, Guo Jianzeng, Guo Suping (female), Huang Lijun, Mei Shitong, Cao Rutao, Cao Baohua, Chang Lihong (female), Cui Haixia (female), Liang Huiling (female), Ge Huibo, Dong Xiaoyu, Han Shuwang, Wen Xiuling (female), Jin Lingzhan (female), Zhan Guohai, Bao Shoukun, Pan Jingdong, Wei Lihua, Wei Zhimin, Ji Tao (Mongolian)		
2023	14th	Ding Wei, Ding Maoting, Ma Changzhai, Ma Yongping, Ma Yujun, Ma Xijun, Wang Xiaohong, Wang Wenqiang, Wang Zhengpu, Wang Lanyu, Wang Yajun, Wang Lianzeng, Wang Baoshan, Wang Jiangguang, Wang Chunsheng, Wang Shuhua, Wang Qing, Wang Shuying, Fang Jianping, Shi Bingqi, Shi Jinjin, Lu Qingguo, Tian Chungang, Tian Guoliang, Tian Jinghong, Feng Lichao, Ning Xiaowu, Liu Changlin, Liu Suyun, Liu Tiejun, Qi Xiumin, Yan Jihong, Guan Dong, An Zhongqi, Sun Qixin, Sun Baofang, Sun Jianshe, Sun Xiling, Su Keshun, Li Dandan, Li Keliang, Li Guoyong, Li Zhixin, Li Jianwei, Li Suhuan, Li Wei, Yang Weikun, Yang Huifang, Yang Baoxin, Yang Rui Shuo, Yang Zhensheng, Shi Qingshuang, Wu Xiangjun, Xin Xiangyang, Shen Zhengchang, Song Huaying, Song Zhihui, Zhang Caifang, Zhang Jun, Zhang Guohua, Zhang Guoqiang, Zhang Meizhi, Zhang Yanqiu, Zhang Xiaojian, Zhang Xuesong, Zhang Shufen, Zhang Qi, Chen Liren, Chen Chunfang, Chen Shubo, Chen Lina, Shao Anlin, Wu Zhiyong, Wu Chunhu, Fan Zhenxi, Shang Jinsuo, Ming Hai, Zhou Pei, Pang Yonghui, Zheng Zhihui, Zhao Zhihai, Hou Erhe, Hou Jingbin, Jiang Jie, Yao Kuizhang, Yuan Silang, Xia Li, Gu Xue, Gu Bo, Ni Yuefeng, Ni Haiqiong, Xu Zixia, Ling Tao, Guo Honggang, Guo Jinkao, Guo Zhiwei, Guo Jianzeng, Guo Jingtao, Tang Jingli, Huang MingyaoCao Caiyun, Cui Haixia, Cui Xueqin, Kang Le, Liang Yinghua, Peng Yanhui, Dong Kaijun, Dong Xiansheng, Dong Xiaohang, Han Xu, Han Li, Jin Lingzhan, Zhan Guohai, He Jie, Pei Hongxia, Tan Shuangjian, Zhai Zhihai, Fan Chenghua, Wei Lihua	123	
