= North China Institute of Science and Technology =

University in Hebei, China

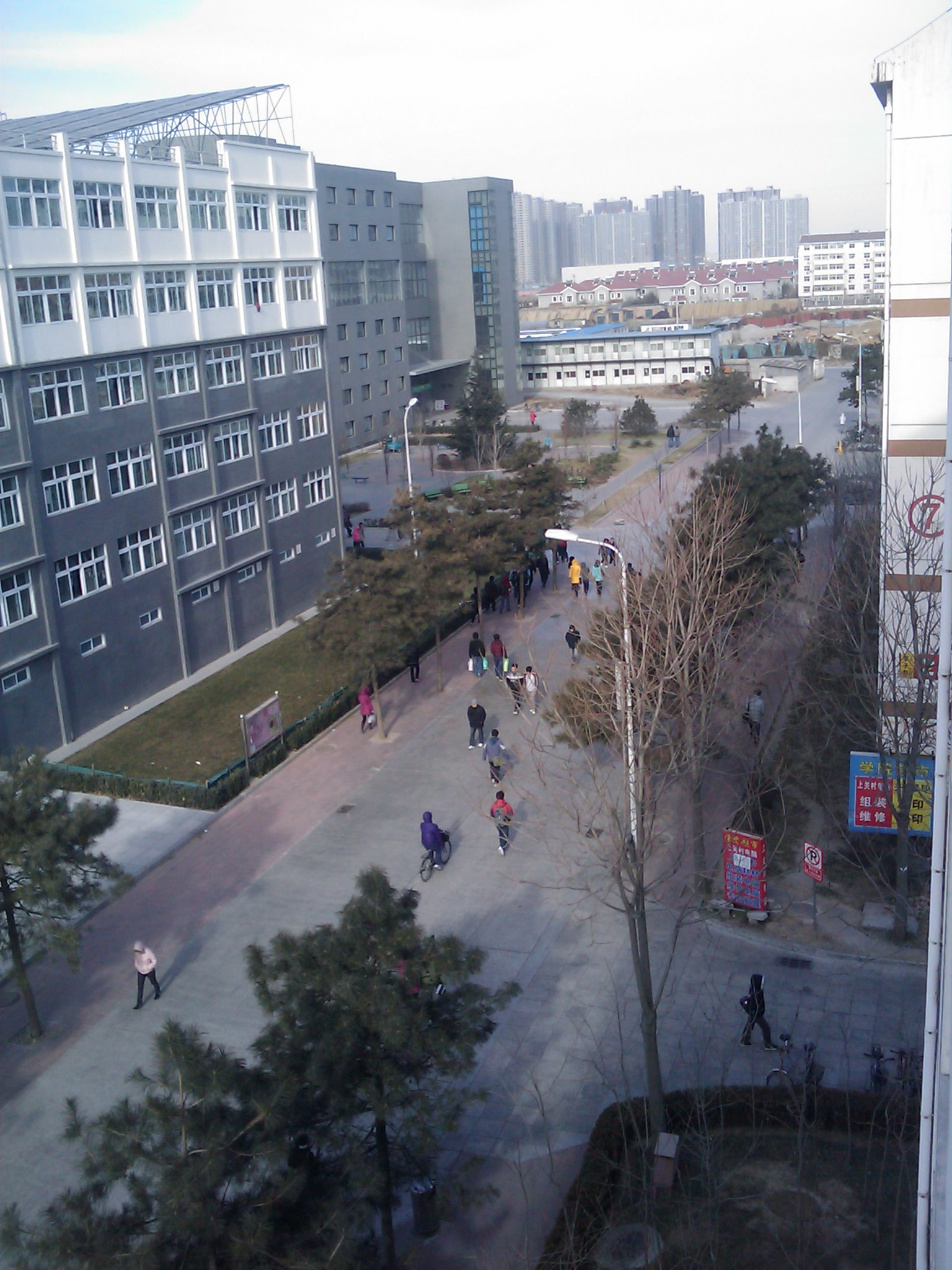
- Location: Sanhe, Hebei, China; 39°57′24″N 116°47′49″E
- Website: http://www.ncist.edu.cn/

North China Institute of Science and Technology (NCIST, Chinese: 华北科技学院; pinyin: Huáběi Kējì Xuéyuàn) is a university in Sanhe, Hebei, China. The university was founded in 1984, formerly named "Beijing Institute of Coal Management, Yanjiao campus". It has been under the management of State Administration of Work Safety since its foundation. In 1993, the institute changed its name to "North China College of Mining". In 2002, the institute adopted its present name, and started to recruit students at general higher education level.

In 2018, as the State Administration of Work Safety has been reorganized into the Emergency Management Ministry of People's Republic of China, the university's management was handed over to the Emergency Management Ministry. The university is the only public university affiliated to the Emergency Management Ministry.

The university has 49 subjects under 14 departments, involving engineering, science, arts, law, economics, management, education and literature.

The university has more than 900 lecturers, half of them are professor or associate professor. Three members of China Engineering Academy work for the university. The university also holds China-Latvia "Belt and Road" Academic Exchange Conference.

According to the official statistics of 2018, 16228 undergraduates and 151 postgraduates chose to study in NCIST.
