= September 6 =

September 6 this year in various calendars
- Sunday, 6 September 2026
Akan	Kwakwasi
Armenian	18 Hoṙi 1476
Aztec	Atemoztli 19, 6 Mazātl
Babylonian	23 Abu, 2337 SE
Balinese pawukon	Menga, Beteng, Sri, Umanis, Was, Redite of Menail, Sri, Tulus, Pandita
Bengali	22 Bhadro, BS 1433
Chinese	Yin Water Goat・Hairy Head Mansion; Fire Horse Year, Month 7, Day 25 (Chushu, 1 day until Bailu)
Common Era	6 September 2026 CE
Coptic	1 Nesi, AM 1742
Egyptian	23 Tybi, 2775 NE
Ethiopian	1 Pāguemēn, 2018 Amätä Məhrät
French Republican	Décade II, Décadi de Fructidor de l'Année 234 de la République
Gregorian	6 September, AD 2026
Hebrew	24 Elul, AM 5786
Hindu	Ārdrā・Siddhi; Solar: 21 Bhādrapada, 1948 SE; Lunisolar: Daśamī, Kṛishna pakṣa of Śrāvaṇa, 2083 VE; Rāudra・5127 KY・1,872,824
Icelandic	Sunnudagur, 13 Tvímánuður 2026
Islamic	23 Rabi' al-awwal, AH 1448 (using tabular method)
ISO week date	2026-W36-7
Japanese	25 Fumizuki, Reiwa 8 (Shosho, 1 day until Hakuro)
Julian	24 August, AD 2026 (AM 7534)
Julian day	2461290
Korean	25 Wonsungidal, 4359 DE
Maya	13.0.13.16.7; 0 Chen, 6 Manik
Roman	ante diem IX Kalendas Septembres, MMDCCLXXIX AUC
Solar Hijri	15 Shahrivar, SH 1405
Tibetan	25 gro bzhin, me pho rta 2153 or 1772 or 1000

<<	September					>>
Su	Mo	Tu	We	Th	Fr	Sa
		1	2	3	4	5
6	7	8	9	10	11	12
13	14	15	16	17	18	19
20	21	22	23	24	25	26
27	28	29	30
2026

September 6 in recent years
2026 (Sunday)
2025 (Saturday)
2024 (Friday)
2023 (Wednesday)
2022 (Tuesday)
2021 (Monday)
2020 (Sunday)
2019 (Friday)
2018 (Thursday)
2017 (Wednesday)

September 6 is the 249th day of the year (250th in leap years) in the Gregorian calendar; 116 days remain until the end of the year.

== Events ==
=== Pre-1600 ===
- 394 – Battle of the Frigidus: Roman emperor Theodosius I defeats and kills Eugenius the usurper. His Frankish magister militum Arbogast escapes but commits suicide two days later.
- 1492 – Christopher Columbus sails from La Gomera in the Canary Islands, his final port of call before crossing the Atlantic Ocean for the first time.
- 1522 – The Victoria returns to Sanlúcar de Barrameda in Spain, the only surviving ship of Ferdinand Magellan's expedition and the first known ship to circumnavigate the world.

=== 1601–1900 ===
- 1620 – The Pilgrim Fathers sail from Plymouth, England, on the Mayflower to settle in North America. (Old Style date; September 16 per New Style date.)
- 1622 – The Spanish treasure galleon Atocha sinks during a hurricane off Key West in the Straits of Florida, taking 40 short tons (36 t) of gold and silver and 260 of its 265 passengers and crew to the bottom.
- 1628 – Puritans settle Salem, which became part of Massachusetts Bay Colony.
- 1634 – Thirty Years' War: In the Battle of Nördlingen, the Catholic Imperial army defeats Swedish and German Protestant forces.
- 1781 – American Revolutionary War: The Battle of Groton Heights takes place, resulting in a British victory.
- 1803 – British scientist John Dalton begins using symbols to represent the atoms of different elements.
- 1859 – Imam Shamil surrenders to the Russians, bringing the Caucasian Imamate to an end.
- 1861 – American Civil War: Forces under Union General Ulysses S. Grant bloodlessly capture Paducah, Kentucky, giving the Union control of the Tennessee River's mouth.
- 1863 – American Civil War: Confederate forces evacuate Battery Wagner and Morris Island in South Carolina.
- 1870 – Louisa Ann Swain of Laramie, Wyoming becomes the first woman in the United States to cast a vote legally after 1807.
- 1885 – Eastern Rumelia declares its union with Bulgaria, thus accomplishing Bulgarian unification.

=== 1901–present ===
- 1901 – Leon Czolgosz, an unemployed anarchist, shoots and fatally wounds US president William McKinley at the Pan-American Exposition in Buffalo, New York.
- 1914 – World War I: The First Battle of the Marne, which would halt the Imperial German Army's advance into France, begins.
- 1915 – World War I: The first tank prototype, developed by William Foster & Co. for the British army, is completed and given its first test drive.
- 1930 – Democratically elected Argentine president Hipólito Yrigoyen is deposed in a military coup.
- 1936 – Spanish Civil War: The Interprovincial Council of Asturias and León is established.
- 1939 – World War II: The British Royal Air Force suffers its first fighter pilot casualty of the Second World War at the Battle of Barking Creek as a result of friendly fire.
- 1939 – World War II: Union of South Africa declares war on Germany.
- 1940 – King Carol II of Romania abdicates and is succeeded by his son Michael. General Ion Antonescu becomes the Conducător of Romania.
- 1943 – The Monterrey Institute of Technology is founded in Monterrey, Mexico as one of the largest and most influential private universities in Latin America.
- 1943 – Pennsylvania Railroad's premier train derails at Frankford Junction in Philadelphia, killing 79 people and injuring 117 others.
- 1944 – World War II: The city of Ypres, Belgium is liberated by Allied forces.
- 1944 – World War II: Soviet forces capture the city of Tartu, Estonia.
- 1946 – United States Secretary of State James F. Byrnes announces that the U.S. will follow a policy of economic reconstruction in postwar Germany.
- 1952 – A prototype aircraft crashes at the Farnborough Airshow in Hampshire, England, killing 29 spectators and the two on board.
- 1955 – Istanbul's Greek, Jewish, and Armenian minorities are the target of a government-sponsored pogrom; dozens are killed in ensuing riots.
- 1962 – The United States government begins the Exercise Spade Fork nuclear readiness drill.
- 1962 – Archaeologist Peter Marsden discovers the first of the Blackfriars Ships dating back to the second century AD in the Blackfriars area of the banks of the River Thames in London.
- 1965 – India retaliates following Pakistan's Operation Grand Slam which results in the Indo-Pakistani War of 1965 that ends in a stalemate followed by the signing of the Tashkent Declaration.
- 1966 – Prime Minister Hendrik Verwoerd, the architect of apartheid, is stabbed to death in Cape Town, South Africa during a parliamentary meeting.
- 1968 – Swaziland becomes independent.
- 1970 – Two passenger jets bound from Europe to New York are simultaneously hijacked by Palestinian terrorist members of the PFLP and taken to Dawson's Field, Jordan.
- 1971 – Paninternational Flight 112 crashes on the Bundesautobahn 7 highway near Hamburg Airport, in Hamburg, Germany, killing 22.
- 1972 – Munich massacre: Nine Israeli athletes die (along with a German policeman) at the hands of the Palestinian "Black September" terrorist group after being taken hostage at the Munich Olympic Games. Two other Israeli athletes were slain in the initial attack the previous day.
- 1976 – Cold War: Soviet Air Defence Forces pilot Viktor Belenko lands a Mikoyan-Gurevich MiG-25 jet fighter at Hakodate in Japan and requests political asylum in the United States; his request is granted.
- 1983 – The Soviet Union admits to shooting down Korean Air Lines Flight 007, stating that its operatives did not know that it was a civilian aircraft when it reportedly violated Soviet airspace.
- 1985 – Midwest Express Airlines Flight 105 crashes near Milwaukee Mitchell International Airport in Milwaukee, Wisconsin, killing all 31 people on board.
- 1986 – In Istanbul, two terrorists from Abu Nidal's organization kill 22 and wound six congregants inside the Neve Shalom Synagogue during Shabbat services.
- 1988 – End of the last stage of the Anfal campaign of Ba'athist Iraq against its Kurdish population, which resulted in major destructions and major civilian losses.
- 1991 – The Soviet Union recognizes the independence of the Baltic states Estonia, Latvia, and Lithuania.
- 1991 – The Russian parliament approves the name change of Leningrad back to Saint Petersburg. The change is effective October 1.
- 1992 – A group of hunters at the Stampede trail near Healy, Alaska come across a male corpse in abandoned bus, later identified as Christopher McCandless.
- 1995 – Cal Ripken Jr. of the Baltimore Orioles plays in his 2,131st consecutive game, breaking a record that had stood for 56 years.
- 1997 – The funeral of Diana, Princess of Wales takes place in London. Well over a million people line the streets and 2 1/2 billion watch around the world on television.
- 1997 – Royal Brunei Airlines Flight 839 crashes in the Lambir Hills National Park while on approach to Miri Airport in Malaysia, killing 10.
- 2003 – Mahmoud Abbas resigns from his position of Palestinian Prime Minister.
- 2007 – Israel executes the air strike Operation Orchard to destroy a nuclear reactor in Syria.
- 2009 – The ro-ro ferry SuperFerry 9 sinks off the Zamboanga Peninsula in the Philippines with 971 persons aboard; all but ten are rescued.
- 2012 – Sixty-one people die after a fishing boat capsizes off the İzmir Province coast of Turkey, near the Greek Aegean islands.
- 2013 – Forty-one elephants are poisoned with cyanide in salt pans, by poachers in Hwange National Park.
- 2013 – The first Minotaur V rocket is launched from the Mid-Atlantic Regional Spaceport on Wallops Island, carrying NASA's LADEE spacecraft.
- 2018 – Supreme Court of India decriminalises all consensual sex among adults in private, making homosexuality legal on the Indian lands.
- 2018 – Brazilian presidential candidate Jair Bolsonaro survives a stabbing at a campaign rally in Juiz de Fora, Minas Gerais.
- 2022 – Boris Johnson resigns as Prime Minister of the United Kingdom, and is replaced by Liz Truss. Their meetings with Queen Elizabeth II at Balmoral Castle were the Queen's final official duties before her death two days later.
- 2022 – Russo-Ukrainian war: Ukraine begins its Kharkiv counteroffensive, surprising Russian forces and retaking over 3,000 square kilometers of land, recapturing the entire Kharkiv Oblast west of the Oskil River, within the next week.
- 2026 – 21 Air Flight 7598, a Boeing 767 freighter operating on behalf of Amazon Air, overruns the runway upon landing at Miami International Airport, striking multiple ground vehicles, killing at least five people, and injuring five others.

== Births ==
=== Pre-1600 ===
- 1475 – Artus Gouffier, Lord of Boissy, French nobleman and politician (died 1519)
- 1475 – Sebastiano Serlio, Italian Mannerist architect (died 1554)

=== 1601–1900 ===
- 1610 – Francesco I d'Este, Duke of Modena, Italian noble (died 1658)
- 1620 – Isabella Leonarda, Italian composer and educator (died 1704)
- 1631 – Charles Porter, English-born judge (died 1696)
- 1633 – Sebastian Knüpfer, German cantor and composer (died 1676)
- 1656 – Guillaume Dubois, French cardinal and politician (died 1723)
- 1666 – Ivan V of Russia, Russian tsar (died 1696)
- 1711 – Henry Muhlenberg, German-American pastor and missionary (died 1787)
- 1729 – Moses Mendelssohn, German philosopher and theologian (died 1786)
- 1732 – Johan Wilcke, Swedish physicist and academic (died 1796)
- 1757 – Gilbert du Motier, Marquis de Lafayette, French general (died 1834)
- 1766 – John Dalton, English chemist, meteorologist, and physicist (died 1844)
- 1781 – Vincent Novello, English composer and publisher (died 1861)
- 1795 – Frances Wright, Scottish-American author and activist (died 1852)
- 1800 – Catharine Beecher, American educator and activist (died 1878)
- 1802 – Alcide d'Orbigny, French zoologist, palaeontologist, and geologist (died 1857)
- 1808 – Emir Abdelkader, Algerian religious and military leader (died 1883)
- 1814 – George-Étienne Cartier, Canadian lawyer and politician, 9th Premier of East Canada (died 1873)
- 1817 – Alexander Tilloch Galt, English-Canadian businessman and politician, 1st Canadian Minister of Finance (died 1893)
- 1819 – William Rosecrans, American general, politician, and diplomat, United States Ambassador to Mexico (died 1898)
- 1838 – Samuel Arnold, American conspirator (died 1906)
- 1852 – Schalk Willem Burger, South African commander, lawyer, and politician, 6th President of the South African Republic (died 1918)
- 1855 – Ferdinand Hummel, German pianist, composer, and conductor (died 1928)
- 1857 – Zelia Nuttall, American archeologist and historian (died 1933)
- 1859 – Macpherson Robertson, Australian businessman and philanthropist, founded MacRobertson's (died 1945)
- 1860 – Jane Addams, American sociologist and author, Nobel Prize laureate (died 1935)
- 1860 – May Jordan McConnel, Australian trade unionist and suffragist (died 1929)
- 1861 – William Lane, English-Australian journalist, founded New Australia (died 1917)
- 1863 – Jessie Willcox Smith, American illustrator (died 1935)
- 1868 – Heinrich Häberlin, Swiss judge and politician, President of the Swiss National Council (died 1947)
- 1869 – Walford Davies, English organist and composer (died 1941)
- 1869 – Felix Salten, Austrian-Swiss author and critic (died 1945)
- 1876 – John Macleod, Scottish physician and physiologist, Nobel Prize laureate (died 1935)
- 1879 – Max Schreck, German actor (died 1936)
- 1879 – Joseph Wirth, German educator and politician, Chancellor of Germany (died 1956)
- 1885 – Otto Kruger, American actor (died 1974)
- 1888 – Joseph P. Kennedy Sr., American businessman and diplomat, 44th United States Ambassador to the United Kingdom (died 1969)
- 1889 – Louis Silvers, American composer (died 1954)
- 1890 – Clara Kimball Young, American actress and producer (died 1960)
- 1892 – Edward Victor Appleton, English-Scottish physicist and academic, Nobel Prize laureate (died 1965)
- 1893 – Claire Lee Chennault, American general and pilot (died 1958)
- 1899 – Billy Rose, American composer and manager (died 1966)
- 1900 – W. A. C. Bennett, Canadian businessman and politician, 25th Premier of British Columbia (died 1979)
- 1900 – Julien Green, French-American author (died 1998)
- 1900 – Nguyễn An Ninh, Vietnamese political journalist (died 1943)

=== 1901–present ===
- 1906 – Luis Federico Leloir, French-Argentine physician and biochemist, Nobel Prize laureate (died 1987)
- 1908 – Anthony Wagner, English genealogist and academic (died 1995)
- 1908 – Korczak Ziolkowski, American sculptor, designed the Crazy Horse Memorial (died 1982)
- 1909 – Michael Gordon, American actor and director (died 1993)
- 1910 – Walter Giesler, American soccer player, referee, and coach (died 1976)
- 1911 – Harry Danning, American baseball player and coach (died 2004)
- 1911 – Charles Deutsch, French aerodynamics engineer and automobile maker, co-founder of the brand "DB (died 1980)
- 1912 – Sir Ewan Forbes, 11th Baronet, Scottish nobleman (died 1991)
- 1912 – Wayne Barlow, American organist, composer, and director (died 1996)
- 1913 – Julie Gibson, American actress and singer (died 2019)
- 1913 – Leônidas, Brazilian footballer (died 2004)
- 1915 – Ed Oliver, American golfer (died 1961)
- 1915 – Franz Josef Strauss, German lieutenant and politician, Minister President of Bavaria (died 1988)
- 1917 – John Berry, American-French actor, director, producer, and screenwriter (died 1999)
- 1917 – George Mann, English cricketer (died 2001)
- 1917 – Philipp von Boeselager, German soldier and economist (died 2008)
- 1919 – Wilson Greatbatch, American engineer and philanthropist (died 2011)
- 1920 – Elvira Pagã, Brazilian actress, singer, and author (died 2003)
- 1921 – Carmen Laforet, Spanish author (died 2004)
- 1921 – Norman Joseph Woodland, American inventor, co-created the bar code (died 2012)
- 1922 – Adriano Moreira, Portuguese politician, Minister of the Overseas Provinces, President of the CDS – People's Party (died 2022)
- 1923 – Peter II of Yugoslavia (died 1970)
- 1924 – John Melcher, American veterinarian and politician (died 2018)
- 1925 – Andrea Camilleri, Italian author, screenwriter, and director (died 2019)
- 1925 – Jimmy Reed, American singer-songwriter and guitarist (died 1976)
- 1926 – Prince Claus of the Netherlands (died 2002)
- 1926 – Jack English Hightower, American lawyer and politician (died 2013)
- 1926 – Arthur Oldham, English composer and conductor (died 2003)
- 1926 – Maurice Prather, American photographer and director (died 2001)
- 1928 – Fumihiko Maki, Japanese architect and academic, designed the Tokyo Metropolitan Gymnasium and Makuhari Messe (died 2024)
- 1928 – Robert M. Pirsig, American novelist and philosopher (died 2017)
- 1928 – Yevgeny Svetlanov, Russian conductor and composer (died 2002)
- 1928 – Sid Watkins, English neurosurgeon and academic (died 2012)
- 1929 – Yash Johar, Indian film producer, founded Dharma Productions (died 2005)
- 1929 – Ljubov Rebane, Estonian physicist and mathematician (died 1991)
- 1930 – Charles Foley, American game designer, co-created Twister (died 2013)
- 1930 – Helmut Piirimäe, Estonian historian and academic (died 2017)
- 1931 – Bud Shrake, American journalist, author, and screenwriter (died 2009)
- 1932 – Colin McColl, English intelligence officer
- 1932 – Gilles Tremblay, Canadian composer and educator (died 2017)
- 1935 – Isabelle Collin Dufresne, French actress and author (died 2014)
- 1935 – Jock Wallace Jr., Scottish footballer and coach (died 1996)
- 1937 – Sergio Aragonés, Spanish-Mexican author and illustrator
- 1937 – Janusz Kurczab, Polish fencer and mountaineer (died 2015)
- 1937 – Jo Anne Worley, American actress, comedian, and singer
- 1938 – Joan Tower, American pianist, composer, and conductor
- 1939 – Brigid Berlin, American actress, painter, and photographer (died 2020)
- 1939 – David Allan Coe, American outlaw country music singer-songwriter and guitarist (died 2026)
- 1939 – Susumu Tonegawa, Japanese biologist and immunologist, Nobel Prize laureate (died 2026)
- 1940 – John M. Hayes, American scientist (died 2017)
- 1940 – Elizabeth Murray, American painter and illustrator (died 2007)
- 1940 – Jackie Trent, English-Spanish singer-songwriter and actress (died 2015)
- 1941 – Roger Law, English illustrator
- 1941 – Monica Mason, South African ballerina and director
- 1942 – Dave Bargeron, American trombonist and tuba player (died 2025)
- 1942 – Richard Hutton, English cricketer
- 1942 – Mel McDaniel, American singer-songwriter and guitarist (died 2011)
- 1943 – Gordon Birtwistle, English engineer and politician
- 1943 – Richard J. Roberts, English biochemist and biologist, Nobel Prize laureate
- 1943 – Roger Waters, English singer-songwriter and bass player
- 1944 – Donna Haraway, American author, academic, and activist
- 1944 – Swoosie Kurtz, American actress
- 1946 – Ron Boone, American basketball player and commentator
- 1946 – Roger Knight, English cricketer and educator
- 1946 – Shirley M. Malcom, American scientist, academic and educator
- 1947 – Jane Curtin, American actress and comedian
- 1947 – Bruce Rioch, English footballer and manager
- 1947 – Jacob Rubinovitz, Polish-Israeli engineer and academic (died 2018)
- 1947 – Sylvester, American singer-songwriter (died 1988)
- 1948 – Claydes Charles Smith, American guitarist (died 2006)
- 1949 – Iris Robinson, Northern Irish politician
- 1951 – Melih Kibar, Turkish composer (died 2005)
- 1952 – Simon Burns, English politician, Minister of State for Transport
- 1952 – Vladimir Kazachyonok, Russian footballer, coach, and manager (died 2017)
- 1952 – Buddy Miller, American singer-songwriter, guitarist, and producer
- 1954 – Carly Fiorina, American businesswoman and activist
- 1954 – Demetris Kizas, Cypriot footballer
- 1954 – Patrick O'Hearn, American bassist and composer
- 1954 – John Sauven, English economist and environmentalist
- 1955 – Raymond Benson, American author and playwright
- 1956 – Bill Ritter, American lawyer and politician, 41st Governor of Colorado
- 1956 – Steven Yearley, English sociologist and academic
- 1957 – Ali Divandari, Iranian painter, sculptor, and journalist
- 1957 – Michaëlle Jean, Haitian-Canadian journalist and politician, 27th Governor General of Canada
- 1957 – José Sócrates, Portuguese engineer and politician, 119th Prime Minister of Portugal
- 1958 – Buster Bloodvessel, English singer-songwriter
- 1958 – Jeff Foxworthy, American comedian, actor, producer, and screenwriter
- 1958 – Nigel Westlake, Australian composer and conductor
- 1958 – Michael Winslow, American actor
- 1958 – The Barbarian, Tongan wrestler
- 1959 – Bill Root, Canadian ice hockey player
- 1961 – Simon Reeve, Australian journalist and game show host
- 1961 – Wendi Richter, American wrestler
- 1961 – Scott Travis, American rock drummer
- 1961 – Paul Waaktaar-Savoy, Norwegian musician and songwriter
- 1962 – Chris Christie, American lawyer and politician, 55th Governor of New Jersey
- 1962 – Marina Kaljurand, Estonian badminton player and diplomat, Estonia Ambassador to Russia
- 1962 – Elizabeth Vargas, American journalist
- 1962 – Kevin Willis, American basketball player and fashion designer
- 1963 – Mark Chesnutt, American singer-songwriter and guitarist
- 1963 – Pat Nevin, Scottish footballer and sportscaster
- 1963 – Betsy Russell, American actress
- 1963 – Alice Sebold, American author
- 1963 – Bryan Simonaire, American engineer and politician
- 1963 – Geert Wilders, Dutch lawyer and politician
- 1964 – Rosie Perez, American actress, dancer, and director
- 1965 – Terry Bickers, English singer-songwriter and guitarist
- 1965 – Darren Clark, Australian sprinter
- 1965 – Tony Fleet, Australian darts player
- 1965 – Christopher Nolan, Irish author and poet (died 2009)
- 1965 – Van Tiffin, American football player
- 1967 – William DuVall, American singer-songwriter and guitarist
- 1967 – Macy Gray, American singer-songwriter, producer, and actress
- 1967 – Kalli Kalde, Estonian painter and illustrator
- 1967 – Milan Lukić, Bosnian Serb convicted of war crimes by the ICTY
- 1967 – Igor Štimac, Croatian footballer and manager
- 1968 – Saeed Anwar, Pakistani cricketer
- 1968 – Christopher Brookmyre, Scottish author
- 1968 – Paul Rea, American journalist
- 1969 – Tony DiTerlizzi, American author and illustrator
- 1969 – Ben Finegold, American chess player and educator
- 1969 – Michellie Jones, Australian-American triathlete
- 1969 – CeCe Peniston, American singer-songwriter, actress, and former beauty pageant winner
- 1970 – Cheyne Coates, Australian singer-songwriter and producer
- 1970 – Igor Korolev, Russian-Canadian ice hockey player and coach (died 2011)
- 1970 – Emily Maitlis, Canadian-English journalist
- 1970 – Rhett Miller, American alternative country singer-songwriter and guitarist
- 1970 – DJ Spooky, American electronic and experimental hip hop musician
- 1971 – Devang Gandhi, Indian cricketer
- 1971 – Asko Künnap, Estonian poet and illustrator
- 1971 – Dolores O'Riordan, Irish singer-songwriter (died 2018)
- 1972 – Dylan Bruno, American actor and model
- 1972 – Idris Elba, English actor
- 1972 – Justina Machado, American actress
- 1972 – Saulius Mikalajūnas, Lithuanian footballer
- 1972 – Anika Noni Rose, American actress and singer
- 1973 – Carlo Cudicini, Italian footballer
- 1973 – Greg Rusedski, Canadian-English tennis player and sportscaster
- 1973 – Alessandro Troncon, Italian rugby player and coach
- 1974 – Tim Henman, English tennis player and sportscaster
- 1974 – Nina Persson, Swedish singer-songwriter and musician
- 1974 – Justin Whalin, American actor
- 1975 – Derrek Lee, American baseball player and coach
- 1975 – Ryoko Tani, Japanese judoka and politician
- 1976 – Rodrigo Amarante, Brazilian singer-songwriter and guitarist
- 1976 – Naomie Harris, English actress
- 1976 – Jon Ander López, Spanish footballer (died 2013)
- 1976 – Tom Pappas, American decathlete and coach
- 1978 – Cisco Adler, American singer-songwriter, guitarist, and producer
- 1978 – Foxy Brown, American rapper
- 1978 – Alex Escobar, Venezuelan baseball player
- 1978 – Mathew Horne, English actor and screenwriter
- 1978 – Homare Sawa, Japanese footballer
- 1979 – Mike Arnaoutis, Greek boxer
- 1979 – Massimo Maccarone, Italian footballer
- 1979 – Carlos Adrián Morales, Mexican footballer
- 1979 – Low Ki, American wrestler
- 1980 – Jillian Hall, American wrestler and singer
- 1980 – Kerry Katona, English singer and actress
- 1980 – Samuel Peter, Nigerian boxer
- 1980 – Joseph Yobo, Nigerian footballer
- 1981 – Yuki Abe, Japanese footballer
- 1981 – Yumiko Cheng, Hong Kong singer and actress
- 1981 – Andrew Richardson, Jamaican cricketer
- 1981 – Mark Teahen, American baseball player
- 1982 – Temeka Johnson, American basketball player
- 1983 – Jerry Blevins, American baseball player
- 1983 – Pippa Middleton, English socialite and author
- 1983 – Braun Strowman, American wrestler and strongman
- 1984 – Helena Ekholm, Swedish skier
- 1984 – William Porterfield, Northern Irish cricketer
- 1985 – Lauren Lapkus, American actress and comedian
- 1985 – Mitch Moreland, American baseball player
- 1985 – Małgorzata Rejmer, Polish novelist
- 1987 – Emir Preldžić, Turkish basketball player
- 1988 – Max George, English singer-songwriter and actor
- 1988 – Denis Tonucci, Italian footballer
- 1989 – Kim So-eun, South Korean actress
- 1990 – John Wall, American basketball player
- 1991 – Brian Dumoulin, American ice hockey player
- 1991 – Joe Harris, American basketball player
- 1992 – Ryan Shazier, American football player
- 1992 – Young Tonumaipea, Samoan rugby league player
- 1993 – Famous Dex, American rapper
- 1993 – Alex Poythress, American basketball player
- 1993 – Mattia Valoti, Italian footballer
- 1994 – Maddie Phillips, Canadian actress
- 1994 – Emilly Micaela Marcondes, Brazilian professional futsal player
- 1994 – Elif Doğan, Turkish actress
- 1995 – Mark Andrews, American football player
- 1995 – Mustafizur Rahman, Bangladeshi cricketer
- 1996 – Andrés Tello, Colombian footballer
- 1996 – Lil Xan, American rapper
- 1997 – Mallory Comerford, American swimmer
- 1997 – Tsukushi, Japanese wrestler
- 1998 – Michele Perniola, Italian singer
- 2000 – David Kushner, American singer-songwriter
- 2001 – Freya Allan, English actress
- 2001 – Terrence Clarke, American basketball player (died 2021)
- 2002 – Asher Angel, American actor
- 2002 – Leylah Fernandez, Canadian tennis player
- 2005 – Elzhana Taniyeva, Kazakh rhythmic gymnast
- 2006 – Prince Hisahito of Akishino, Japanese prince

== Deaths ==
=== Pre-1600 ===
- 394 – Eugenius, Roman usurper
- 926 – Taizu of Liao, Khitan ruler (born 872)
- 952 – Suzaku, emperor of Japan (born 923)
- 957 – Liudolf, duke of Swabia (born 930)
- 972 – John XIII, pope of the Catholic Church (born 930)
- 1178 – Ioveta, Latin princess
- 1276 – Vicedomino de Vicedominis, Italian cardinal (born 1210)
- 1431 – Demetrios Laskaris Leontares, Byzantine admiral and diplomat
- 1511 – Ashikaga Yoshizumi, Japanese shōgun (born 1481)
- 1553 – Juan de Homedes y Coscon, 47th Grandmaster of the Knights Hospitaller (born c.1477)
- 1566 – Suleiman the Magnificent, Ottoman sultan (born 1494)

=== 1601–1900 ===
- 1625 – Thomas Dempster, Scottish historian and scholar (born 1579)
- 1635 – Adriaan Metius, Dutch mathematician and astronomer (born 1571)
- 1649 – Robert Dudley, English geographer and explorer (born 1574)
- 1683 – Jean-Baptiste Colbert, French economist and politician, French Controller-General of Finances (born 1619)
- 1708 – Sir John Morden, 1st Baronet, English merchant and philanthropist, founded Morden College (born 1623)
- 1783 – Carlo Bertinazzi, Italian actor and author (born 1710)
- 1808 – Louis-Pierre Anquetil, French historian and author (born 1723)
- 1836 – Gaspar Flores de Abrego, three-term mayor of San Antonio, in Spanish Texas (born 1781)
- 1868 – Pierre Adolphe Rost, American lawyer, judge, and politician (born 1797)
- 1885 – Narcís Monturiol, Spanish engineer, designed the Ictineo I and Ictineo II (born 1819)
- 1891 – Charles Jamrach, German-English businessman (born 1815)

=== 1901–present ===
- 1902 – Frederick Abel, English chemist and engineer (born 1827)
- 1907 – Sully Prudhomme, French poet and critic, Nobel Prize laureate (born 1839)
- 1919 – Lord Charles Beresford, English admiral and politician (born 1846)
- 1927 – William Libbey, American target shooter and geographer (born 1855)
- 1938 – John Stuart Hindmarsh, English race car driver and pilot (born 1907)
- 1939 – Arthur Rackham, English illustrator (born 1867)
- 1940 – Thomas Harte, executed Irish Republican (born 1915)
- 1940 – Patrick McGrath, executed Irish Republican (born 1894)
- 1944 – James Cannon Jr., American Bishop of the Methodist Episcopal Church, South (born 1864)
- 1945 – John S. McCain Sr., American admiral (born 1884)
- 1949 – Song Qiyun, Chinese communist activist (born 1904)
- 1949 – Song Zhenzhong, Chinese child internee (born 1941)
- 1949 – Xu Linxia, Chinese communist activist (born 1904/1905)
- 1949 – Yang Hucheng, Chinese general (born 1893)
- 1950 – Olaf Stapledon, English philosopher and author (born 1886)
- 1951 – James W. Gerard, American lawyer and diplomat, United States Ambassador to Germany (born 1867)
- 1952 – Gertrude Lawrence, English actress, singer, and dancer (born 1898)
- 1956 – Witold Hurewicz, Polish mathematician (born 1904)
- 1956 – Lee Jung-seob, North Korean painter (born 1916)
- 1959 – Edmund Gwenn, English actor (born 1877)
- 1959 – Kay Kendall, English actress and comedian (born 1927)
- 1962 – Hanns Eisler, German-Austrian composer (born 1898)
- 1962 – Seiichiro Kashio, Japanese tennis player (born 1892)
- 1966 – Margaret Sanger, American nurse, educator, and activist (born 1879)
- 1966 – Hendrik Verwoerd, Dutch-South African journalist and politician, 7th Prime Minister of South Africa (born 1901)
- 1969 – Arthur Friedenreich, Brazilian footballer (born 1892)
- 1972 – Perpetrator and victims of the Munich massacre
  - Luttif Afif, Palestinian terrorist (born 1945)
  - David Berger, American-Israeli weightlifter (born 1944)
  - Ze'ev Friedman, Polish-Israeli weightlifter (born 1944)
  - Yossef Gutfreund, Israeli wrestling judge (born 1931)
  - Eliezer Halfin, Russian-Israeli wrestler (born 1948)
  - Amitzur Shapira, Russian-Israeli runner and coach (born 1932)
  - Kehat Shorr, Romanian shooting coach (born 1919)
  - Mark Slavin, Israeli wrestler (born 1954)
  - Andre Spitzer, Romanian-Israeli fencer and coach (born 1945)
  - Yakov Springer, Polish-Israeli wrestler and coach (born 1921)
- 1974 – Olga Baclanova, Russian-Swiss actress and ballerina (born 1896)
- 1974 – Otto Kruger, American actor (born 1885)
- 1978 – Max Decugis, French tennis player (born 1882)
- 1978 – Tom Wilson, American record producer (born 1931)
- 1978 – Adolf Dassler, German cobbler and entrepreneur, founded Adidas (born 1900)
- 1979 – Ronald Binge, English organist and composer (born 1910)
- 1982 – Azra Erhat, Turkish archaeologist, author, and academic (born 1915)
- 1984 – Ernest Tubb, American singer-songwriter and guitarist (born 1914)
- 1985 – Franco Ferrara, Italian conductor and composer (born 1911)
- 1986 – Blanche Sweet, American actress (born 1896)
- 1990 – Tom Fogerty, American singer-songwriter and guitarist (born 1941)
- 1990 – Len Hutton, English cricketer (born 1916)
- 1994 – Nicky Hopkins, English pianist (born 1944)
- 1997 – P. H. Newby, English author and broadcaster (born 1918)
- 1998 – Akira Kurosawa, Japanese director, producer, and screenwriter (born 1910)
- 1998 – Ernst-Hugo Järegård, Swedish actor (born 1928)
- 2005 – Hasan Abidi, Pakistani journalist and poet (born 1929)
- 2000 – Abdul Haris Nasution, Indonesian general (born 1918)
- 2005 – Eugenia Charles, Dominican lawyer and politician, 2nd Prime Minister of Dominica (born 1919)
- 2007 – Madeleine L'Engle, American author and poet (born 1918)
- 2007 – Luciano Pavarotti, Italian tenor (born 1935)
- 2008 – Anita Page, American actress (born 1910)
- 2009 – Catherine Gaskin, Irish-Australian author (born 1929)
- 2010 – Boris Chetkov, Russian painter (born 1926)
- 2010 – Clive Donner, English director and editor (born 1926)
- 2011 – Michael S. Hart, American author, founded Project Gutenberg (born 1947)
- 2012 – Elisabeth Böhm, German architect (born 1921)
- 2012 – Lawrie Dring, Scottish scout leader, founded World Federation of Independent Scouts (born 1931)
- 2012 – Oscar Rossi, Argentine footballer and manager (born 1930)
- 2013 – Ann C. Crispin, American author (born 1950)
- 2014 – Odd Bondevik, Norwegian bishop and theologian (born 1941)
- 2014 – Seth Martin, Canadian ice hockey player and coach (born 1933)
- 2014 – Kira Zvorykina, Belarusian chess player and educator (born 1919)
- 2015 – Martin Milner, American actor (born 1931)
- 2017 – Peter Luck, Australian journalist and television host (born 1944)
- 2017 – Kate Millett, American feminist author and activist (born 1934)
- 2018 – Richard DeVos, American billionaire businessman (born 1926)
- 2018 – Liz Fraser, English actress (born 1930)
- 2018 – Burt Reynolds, American actor, director and producer (born 1936)
- 2019 – Robert Mugabe, Zimbabwean politician, 2nd President of Zimbabwe (born 1924)
- 2020 – Lou Brock, American baseball player (born 1939)
- 2021 – Jean-Paul Belmondo, French actor (born 1933)
- 2021 – Michael K. Williams, American actor (born 1966)
- 2024 – Ayşenur Ezgi Eygi, Turkish-American activist (born 1998)
- 2024 – Rebecca Horn, German visual artist (born 1944)
- 2024 – Will Jennings, American songwriter (born 1944)
- 2024 – Cathy Merrick, Canadian First Nations leader (born 1961/1962)
- 2024 – Ron Yeats, Scottish footballer (born 1937)
- 2025 – Rick Davies, English musician (born 1944)

== Holidays and observances ==
- Christian feast days:
  - Begga
  - Chagnoald
  - Faustus, Abibus and Dionysius of Alexandria
  - Gondulphus of Metz
  - Blessed Jan Franciszek Czartoryski
  - Magnus of Füssen
  - Onesiphorus
  - Zechariah (Hebrew prophet) (Catholic church)
  - September 6 (Eastern Orthodox liturgics)
- The earliest date on which the Abbots Bromley Horn Dance is performed
- Armed Forces Day (São Tomé and Príncipe)
- Defence Day or Army Day (Pakistan)
- Flag Day (Bonaire)
- Independence Day (Swaziland), celebrates the independence of Eswatini from the United Kingdom in 1968
- Unification Day (Bulgaria)
