= Xifeng concentration camp =

Kuomintang concentration camp in Guizhou, China

Xifeng concentration camp 息烽集中營 (Chinese)
- Kuomintang concentration camp (1938–1946)
- Coordinates: 27°02′37″N 106°44′15″E
- Location: Maodong Village, Xifeng County, Guizhou, China
- Operated by: Kuomintang and the Juntong
- Operational: September 1938 – July 1946
- Inmates: Mainly Juntong members and Communists
- Number of inmates: At least 3,200
- Killed: At least 600
- Notable inmates: See notable inmates

Major cultural heritage sites under national-level protection
- Type: Ancient buildings and historical monuments
- Designated: 1988 (3rd batch)
- Reference no.: 3-161

The Xifeng concentration camp (simplified Chinese: 息烽集中营; traditional Chinese: 息烽集中營; pinyin: Xīfēng jízhōngyíng) was a concentration camp in Xifeng County, Guizhou, China. Established by the Kuomintang (KMT) following the Marco Polo Bridge incident in 1937, the camp – the largest of the KMT's internment sites – was constructed primarily to discipline staff of the Bureau of Investigation and Statistics (Juntong) and hold members of the Chinese Communist Party (CCP). Initially modelled after Nazi concentration camps, it was led from 1938 through 1941 by He Qisheng, who strictly controlled prisoners and guards. When Zhou Yanghao assumed leadership of the camp in March 1941, he reformed the camp along the Soviet philosophy of "corrective labour" while simultaneously reorganizing camp administration. The camp was dissolved in 1946, and in 1988 the former site was designated a National Key Cultural Relic. Since 1997, it has been a destination for red tourism.

Under both directors, the Xifeng concentration camp had a reputation for violence, and rape and torture were commonplace. Prisoners were divided by camp administrators into a hierarchy based on their organizational affiliations, with members of the Juntong holding higher status than communists. Inmates, meanwhile, established their own hierarchy, with a group of CCP members banding together to challenge KMT rule and improve the treatment of prisoners. According to the Ministry of Culture of China, approximately 3,200 people were detained at Xifeng; of these, 600 died during their internment.

== History ==
=== Establishment ===
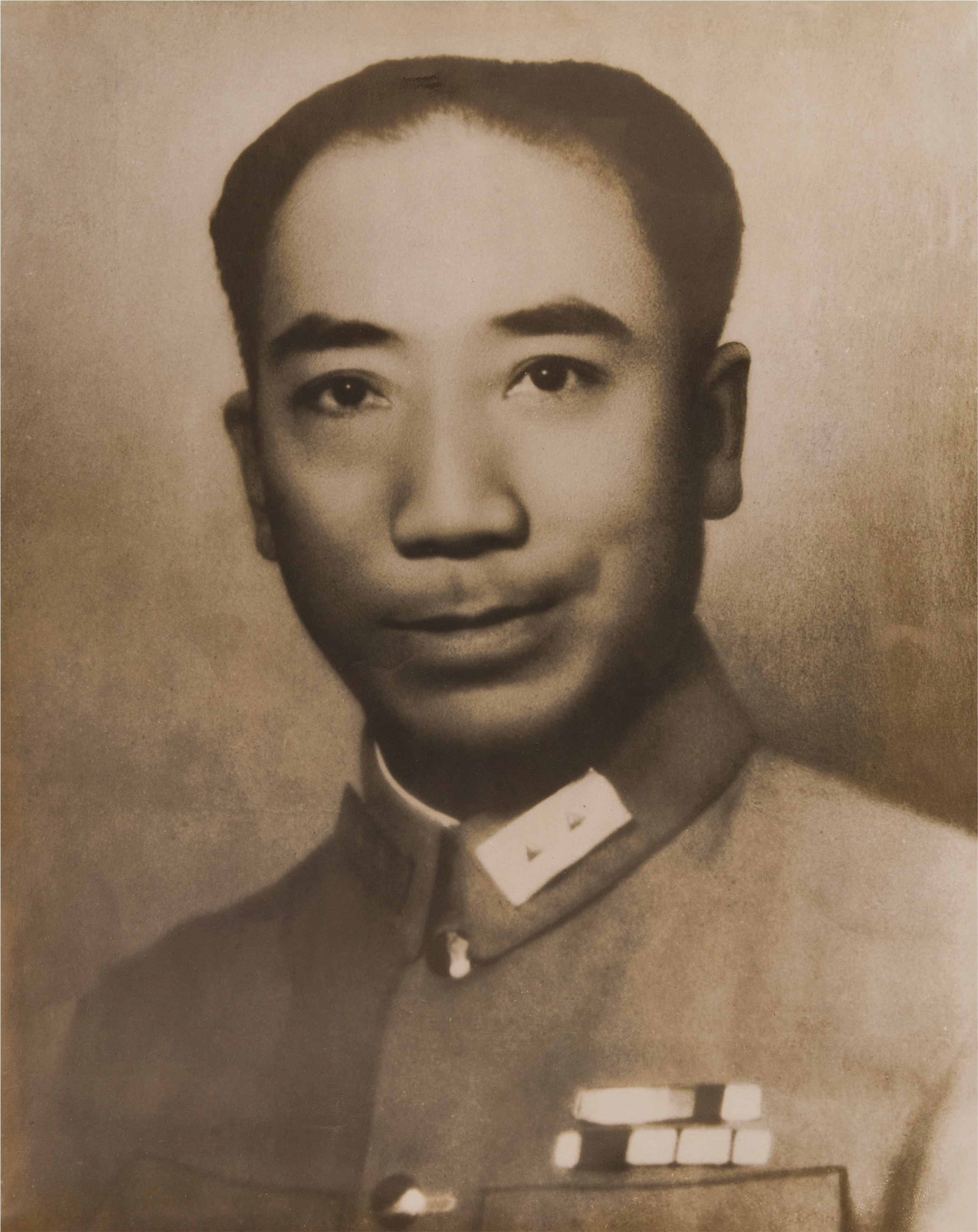
Dai Li established several camps, including Xifeng, through the Bureau of Investigation and Statistics.

Construction of the Xifeng concentration camp began following the Marco Polo Bridge incident of July 1937, during which members of the Imperial Japanese Army came into conflict with the National Revolutionary Army – the military arm of the ruling Kuomintang (KMT) party – outside Beijing. The KMT government, which at the time was capturing suspected members of the Chinese Communist Party (CCP), (Note: This process had begun in 1927 following the Shanghai massacre (Chen & Ren 2017).) closed its camp in Nanjing and migrated the government southward as the ensuing Second Sino-Japanese War escalated. (Note: The Imperial Japanese Army had marched on Hankou and Tianjin by the end of July. They captured Shanghai in November 1937, and seized the capital of Nanjing in December (McKenna 2024).)

Generalissimo Chiang Kai-shek, the leader of the KMT government, viewed the German model of concentration camps as an "efficient means ... to quell communist opposition and pacify society." To implement this model near the new capital of Chongqing, Dai Li – the director of the Bureau of Investigation and Statistics (commonly known as the Juntong) – arranged for multiple sites due to the number of detainees; these included Xifeng, as well as Baigongguan and Wanglongmen Prisons in Chongqing. As the government moved southward, more than 15,000 troops were stationed in Xifeng, which then only had a population of 2,000.

Xifeng was constructed on the site of a manor house owned by the Liu family. It was located in what is now Maodong Village, Yongjing Town, part of Xifeng County, Guizhou, approximately 80 kilometres (50 mi) north of the provincial capital of Guiyang. This allowed for the ready transportation of materials and personnel from the wartime capital of Chongqing, with which Guiyang was connected by highway. The mountainous terrain also allowed for ready concealment.

As originally established, the camp consisted of two sites covering two square kilometres (0.77 sq mi). These sites were centred around the Yanglangba and Xuantian caves. Yanglangba Cave, which has an area of approximately 40 square metres (430 sq ft), was supplemented with since-demolished barracks and a two-metre (6 ft 7 in)-tall wall that extended for 1,100 metres (3,600 ft). The area near the cave was used primarily for office work. Meanwhile, the Xuantian Cave measures approximately 30 metres (98 ft) high, 54 metres (177 ft) across at its widest, and 137 metres (449 ft) deep. Most detainees were kept near this cave, with particularly important prisoners held within it. Part of the site's cave system is the "Cat Cave" (猫洞), a hidden alcove approximately 10 square metres (110 sq ft) in size that was used for torture and isolation.

The Xifeng camp, codenamed "Alarmfire", began operations in 1938. As with other internment camps, it was not acknowledged; the Xifeng camp was officially identified as the Xifeng Headquarters of the National Government Military Commission. Xifeng was the largest of the KMT camps, and held the party's most important prisoners. Ultimately, the model used by Xifeng and the Shangrao concentration camp in Shangrao was emulated for numerous black sites operated by the KMT.

For its first three years, the Xifeng camp was under the directorship of He Qisheng (Chinese: 何缉生) also called He Zizhen (何子贞) and He Zizheng (何子正). The sinologist Klaus Mühlhahn, in his exploration of criminal justice in China, writes that Xifeng under He was "marked by a high degree of violence, harsh living conditions, executions, assaults on prisoners, and a high mortality rate," with prisoners remaining in incarceration rather than used for labour. The first detainees arrived in September 1938, two hundred people who had been transferred from Nanjing as the Japanese Army came southward. These arrivals were forced to construct their own barracks, being temporarily accommodated in local farmhouses.

Security was tight, with passwords required for general mobility as well as entry to specific buildings. Prisoners were under the supervision of two lookout stations, with additional guards deployed at night. Prisoners were not allowed to communicate with the outside world, and communications between them were limited. Each group of prisoners had a room leader, tasked with supervising the group and liable for misbehaviour, and all prisoners were encouraged to act as informants. Room leaders were known to make spurious accusations in order to curry favour with camp management.

=== Zhou Yanghao leadership ===
He Qisheng was replaced in March 1941 by Zhou Yanghao, a graduate of the Shanghai Law Academy. He sought to implement a "corrective labour" model inspired by the Soviet Union. For this, he oversaw the rapid expansion of the camp, which grew to include eight barracks for men – each named for a tenet of Confucian philosophy, such as yi (righteousness) and xiao (filial piety), and divided into four or five rooms – as well as a special residence (特斋) for women. Also constructed were a machine shop, assembly hall, study room, and garden. This was accompanied by a revamping of the camp's administrative system, with the intent of increasing its efficiency, as well as the introduction of a bureau dedicated to the re-education of prisoners, which produced two magazines and several booklets.

Following this series of reforms, prisoners in Xifeng began to produce goods for sale. These included textiles, wood carvings, pottery, straw sandals, soap, and cigarettes. Prisoners who surpassed their quota were provided scrip to be used at the newly established cooperative for food, cigarettes, or alcohol. Great emphasis was given to modifying prisoners' thoughts and beliefs, both through the KMT's political ideology and traditional philosophy. Different parts of the camp were rebranded, with the camp being deemed "university", cells "study rooms", prisoners "convalescents", and executions "study abroad". At the same time, violence remained common, and prisoners' quality of life was poor. Contact with the outside world remained prohibited, though inter-prisoner communication was allowed. (Note: For example, the Xifeng Concentration Camp Revolutionary History Memorial Hall (2021) notes that husband and wife Song Qiyun and Xu Linxia were initially unaware that they were both being held in the same prison. After Luo Shiwen petitioned Director Zhou, the couple were allowed weekly meetings.)

The CCP internees used these relaxations to establish a "Secret Cell", under the leadership of Luo Shiwen, which eventually extended to all members and sympathizers in the camp. Through carefully orchestrated resistance, they successfully pressured Zhou Yanghao to allow barracks to remain open during daytime hours, reduce beatings, and improve food quality. Several members of the group gained positions that enabled them to spread Communist literature, though prisoners continued to be required to prove their dedication to the KMT's ideology.

Xifeng was dissolved in July 1946, (Note: Dai Li had died in an aviation accident on 17 March 1946. In the aftermath, amidst extensive power struggles, the Juntong was downsized and reorganized (Yick 1995, pp. 482, 489).) and many of the detainees were sent to Chongqing; before the CCP gained control of the city in 1949, almost all of these inmates had been executed. The camp's approach to indoctrination and thought reform was subsequently adopted by the CCP and used in the People's Republic of China following the country's establishment. In the 1980s, former detainee Han Zidong returned to the site to find the graves of seven people executed after attempting to infiltrate the Juntong; their remains were identified and reinterred.

== Prisoners ==
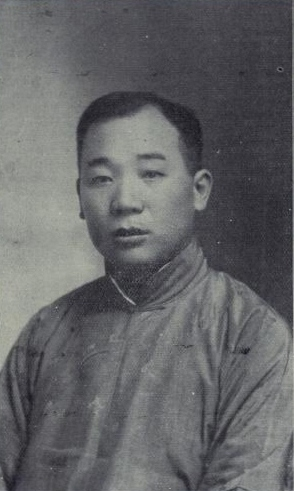
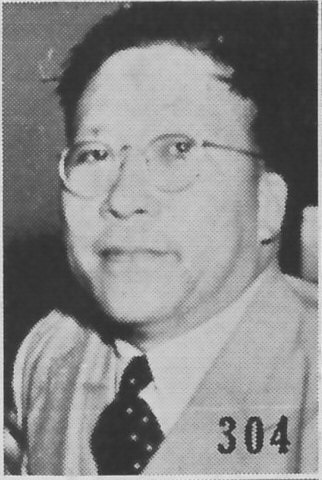
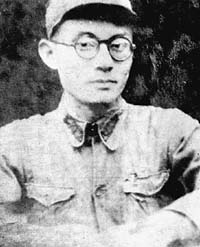
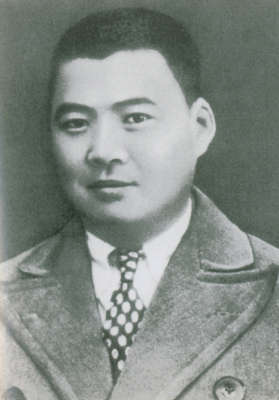
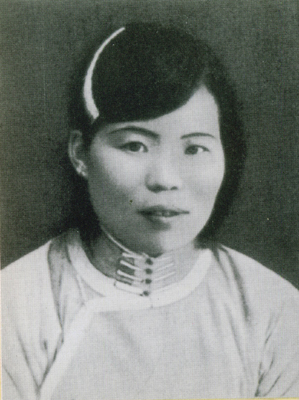
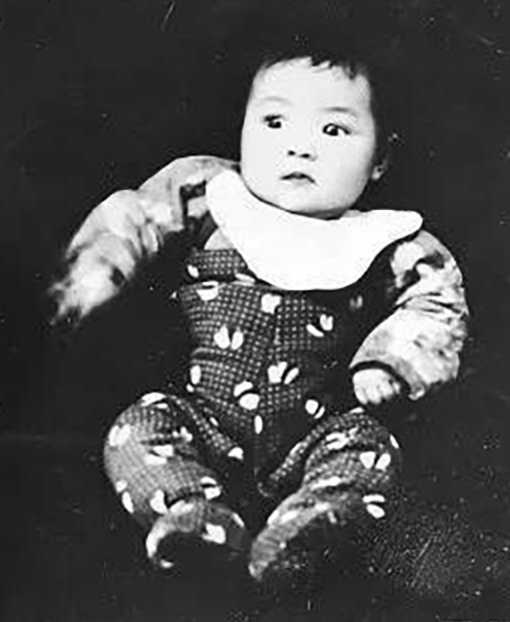
Held at Xifeng were (left-to-right, top-to-bottom) Ma Yinchu, Yang Hucheng, Luo Shiwen, Song Qiyun, Xu Linxia, and Song Zhenzhong

Throughout its existence, Xifeng housed several hundred internees at any given time; according to the Ministry of Culture of China, approximately 3,200 people were detained at Xifeng between 1938 and 1946. These prisoners were held based on accusations of political enmity, rather than any formal criminal indictment; as a result, they had no legal protections, nor did they have any expected time of release. Some prisoners, such as Yang Hucheng, were detained with their families, (Note: Yang was detained with his wife Xie Baozhen and two of their children, daughter Yang Zhenggui and son Yang Zhengzhong. The four were executed in 1949, then reinterred the following year at the General Yang Hucheng Cemetery in Chang'an District, Xian (Du 2020).) while others – such as six relatives of Zhou Fohai (Note: Zhou Fohai had allied with Wang Jingwei and his Reorganized National Government of the Republic of China, which collaborated with the Empire of Japan during the Second Sino-Japanese War. Under the command of Dai Li, Juntong agents captured his mother; his younger sister and her husband; and his father-in-law, his wife, and their daughter (Martin 2009, p. 60).) – were held due to the activities of their family members.

Prisoners were sorted into a hierarchy based on their political associations. At the top of the hierarchy were Juntong members who had been accused of dereliction of duty or disobedience; according to Mühlhahn, these accounted for approximately 70 per cent of all detainees. Below them were members of the CCP, mostly students and intellectuals, and persons accused of collaborating with Japanese forces. A third category consisted of prominent prisoners who, though kept in isolation from the general population, generally received better treatment. The prisoners themselves established a hierarchy based on seniority, with many of the CCP detainees basing their status on their underground work. Prisoners were also differentiated by sex and age, with female internees and their children held in a dedicated area of the camp.

Extensive acts of violence were recorded. Female prisoners were raped by their Juntong guards. Torture was commonly used to collect information, with practices including burning prisoners with boiling water and hot irons, subjecting them to electrical shocks, and dunking them into "water of hot pepper". Where prisoners were executed, guards were required to take photographs of them before, during, and afterwards, then submit these photographs to central command as proof. Although the concentration camp model used by the KMT was generally intended to condition internees to become loyal to the party, the Ministry of Culture reports that more than six hundred detainees died before the camp's closure.

Notable inmates included:

- Che Yaoxian, communist
- Chen Qiyou, member of the China Zhi Gong Party
- Han Zidong, communist
- Huang Xiansheng, general in the Northeastern Volunteer Righteous and Brave Fighters
- Luo Shiwen, communist executed by the KMT
- Ma Yinchu, economist
- Song Qiyun, communist and husband of Xu Linxia
- Song Zhenzhong, son of Song Qiyun and Xu Linxia
- Yang Hucheng, general in the Republic of China Army
- Xu Linxia, communist and wife of Song Qiyun
- Xu Xiaoxuan, communist

== Xifeng Concentration Camp Site and Memorial Hall ==
=== Tourism development ===
The Xifeng concentration camp site was declared a National Key Cultural Relic on 13 January 1988, part of the third batch of heritage sites identified by the State Administration of Cultural Heritage. In 1996, the site was renovated by the Guiyang Municipal Government, with total funds allocated by all government levels reaching ¥50 million (US$7,000,000) as of 2024. It was opened to the public in 1997, with the intent of using it as a tourist attraction and a means of patriotic education. Premier Li Peng attended the site in July 1997, leaving the inscription "The Xifeng heroes inspire the people to move forward courageously." (Note: Original: ｢息烽英烈激励人民勇往直前｣.)

In subsequent years, the Xifeng site was expanded. An exhibition hall was constructed in 2008, with an 800-square-metre (8,600 sq ft) plaza installed alongside it. As the site was expanded, Maodong Village received extensive investment, including the paving of roads, installation of streetlights, and development of an agricultural cooperative. As of 2019, the former Xifeng concentration camp has received a tourist attraction rating of 4A and hosted nine million visitors. It is considered a red tourism destination, and as of 2020 can be accessed by bus via Station No 1 on Yan'anxi Rd, Guiyang. Entry is ¥15 (US$2.17).

=== Current site ===
The Xifeng Concentration Camp Site covers an area of 57,124.4 square metres (614,882 sq ft). The entrance gate identifies the site as the Xifeng Headquarters of the National Government Military Commission, the site's official name when the camp was operational. Further in is a sign reading "Lift Your Head Up" (抬起头来), which Li Jingya of the Xinhua Daily Telegraph describes as having been installed by the KMT to urge internees to acknowledge their wrongs. The site consists of the caves, as well as expansive gardens and a central plaza. The barracks are accessible to the public, and showcase prisoner beds that are 1 1/4 feet (0.38 m) wide. Elsewhere on the grounds, wooden cages and iron shackles are displayed.

Central to the plaza is the sculpture Song of Loyal Souls (忠魂曲), which depicts a group of people identified as martyrs who are restrained by iron shackles and high walls. To the side of the plaza is a two-storey memorial hall, which consists of four exhibition halls that display more than 350 pictures and 160 artefacts, including makeup owned by the communist spy Zhang Luping, issues of the prisoner-developed publication Resurrection Monthly (复活月刊), and writings by Che Yaoxian. A projection room screens a documentary film titled The Undying Flame (烽火不息), which introduces the camp and the experiences of its prisoners.

== Works cited ==
- Chen Bowei (陈伯伟), Ren Yongda (任永达) (1 June 2017). "寻访小萝卜头"采访纪实贵州息烽站——息烽英烈激励人民勇往直前 ["Searching for Little Radish Head": Record of Guizhou Xifeng Camp – Xifeng Heroes Inspire People to Move Forward Courageously] (in Chinese). Jiangsu Central Committee.
- Colville, Penelope (May 2011). "The Hidden Land of Guizhou". China Today. 60 (5): 58–61.
- Du Rong (杜荣), ed. (26 March 2020). 杨虎城将军陵园 [General Yang Hucheng Cemetery] (in Chinese). Xi'an Municipal Government.
- Forth, Aidan (2024). Camps: A Global History of Mass Confinement. Toronto: University of Toronto Press. ISBN 978-1-4875-8830-4.
- 貴州息烽集中營革命歷史紀念館 [Guizhou Xifeng Concentration Camp Revolutionary History Memorial Hall] (in Chinese). Chinese Communist Party.
- "Intoxicated on the Colorful Guizhou Province". Ministry of Culture. 11 October 2014.
- Li Jingya (李惊亚) (4 April 2024). 探访息烽集中营旧址，追寻先烈们的热血与信仰 [Visit the Site of Xifeng Concentration Camp and Trace the Passion and Faith of the Martyrs]. Xinhua Daily Telegraph (in Chinese). Xinhua News Agency.
- Martin, Brian G. (2009). "Collaboration within Collaboration: Zhou Fohai's Relations with the Chongqing Government, 1942–1945". Twentieth-Century China. 34 (2): 55–88. doi:10.1353/tcc.0.0013. ProQuest 2866460778.
- McKenna, Amy (1 August 2024). "Second Sino-Japanese War". Encyclopaedia Britannica.
- Mühlhahn, Klaus (2009). Criminal Justice in China: A History. Cambridge: Harvard University Press. ISBN 978-0-674-05433-2.
- Mühlhahn, Klaus (2010). "The Concentration Camp in Global Historical Perspective". History Compass. 8 (6): 543–561. doi:10.1111/j.1478-0542.2010.00687.x.
- 国务院关于公布第三批全国重点文物保护单位名单的通知 [Notice of the State Council on the Announcement of the Third Batch of National Key Cultural Relics Protection Sites] (in Chinese). State Administration of Cultural Heritage. 13 January 1988. Archived from the original on 1 May 2012.
- Si Lautai (斯劳泰) (1991). 军统的'大学'——息烽监狱 [The 'University' of the Military Statistics Bureau (Juntong) — Xifeng Prison]. Research on Crime and Rehabilitation. 6 (5): 70–73.
- "Site of Xifeng Concentration Camp". Ministry of Culture. 15 February 2008.
- 宋绮云在息烽集中营的铁窗岁月 [Song Qiyun's Years Behind Bars in Xifeng Concentration Camp] (in Chinese). Xifeng Concentration Camp Revolutionary History Memorial Hall. 25 February 2021 – via Xifeng County Government.
- Song Yuzhi (宋淯知) (5 September 2018). 陈其尤：其心昭昭 致公情尤 [Chen Qiyou: His Heart is Clear and His Love for the Public is Strong]. China Children's Press (in Chinese) – via Xinhai Revolution Network.
- Xia, Zhihou (4 October 2024). "Marco Polo Bridge Incident". Encyclopaedia Britannica.
- "Xifeng Concentration Camp". China Daily. 6 January 2020.
- "Xifeng Concentration Camp Revolutionary History Memorial Hall". Guiyang Provincial Government. 18 October 2019.
- 息烽集中营 [Xifeng Concentration Camp]. Encyclopaedia of China (in Chinese) (3rd ed.).
- 息烽集中营 [Xifeng Concentration Camp Site]. Encyclopaedia of China (in Chinese) (3rd ed.).
- Yang, Feiyue (30 March 2021). "Patriotic Site Boosts Rural Tourism and Helps Educate Visitors". China Daily: 17. ProQuest 2506608720.
- Yick, Joseph K. S. (1995). "Juntong and the Ma Hansan Affair: Factionalism in the Nationalist Secret Service, 1946–1949". Modern China. 21 (4): 481–505. doi:10.1177/009770049502100404. JSTOR 189388.
