= Song Zhenzhong =

Chinese child killed by the KMT in 1949

- 宋振中
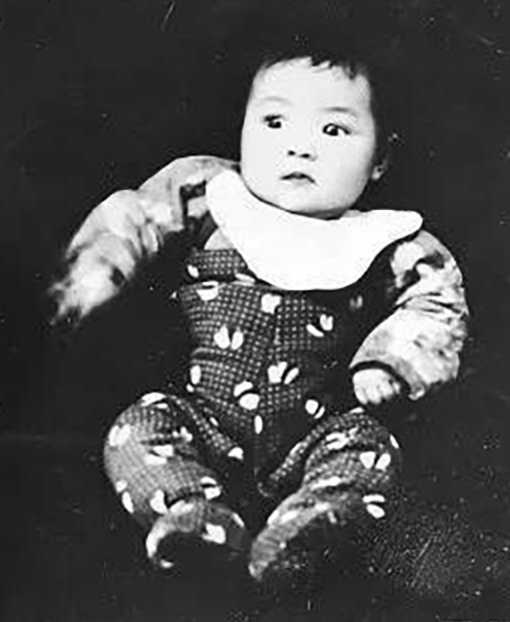
- Song, 1941
- Born: 15 March 1941; Xi'an, Shaanxi, China
- Died: 6 September 1949 (aged 8); Chongqing, China
- Parents: Song Qiyun (father); Xu Linxia (mother)

Chinese name
- Chinese: 宋振中
Transcriptions
Standard Mandarin
- Hanyu Pinyin: Sòng Zhènzhōng
- Wade–Giles: Sung^{4} Chen^{4}chung^{1}

Song Zhenzhong (Chinese: 宋振中; pinyin: Sòng Zhènzhōng; 15 March 1941 – 6 September 1949), popularly known as Little Radish Head (小蘿蔔頭; Xiǎo Luóbo Tóu), was the son of Chinese Communist Party members Song Qiyun and Xu Linxia. Held by the Kuomintang for the majority of his life, he was killed together with his parents as part of a mass killing of detainees. He has been identified as "China's youngest martyr", and featured extensively in film and literature, including in Chinese state propaganda. He has also been commemorated with multiple monuments.

== Biography ==
Song was born on 15 March 1941 in Xi'an, Shaanxi, to Song Qiyun and Xu Linxia, two members of the Chinese Communist Party (CCP) who had married in 1928. A former journalist reporting to General Yang Hucheng, Song Qiyun had edited the Northwest Cultural Daily and spoken against the direction of the Kuomintang (KMT) government under Generalissimo Chiang Kai-shek. Xu Linxia, meanwhile, had led the women's branch of the CCP in Pi County, Jiangsu. Amidst the tensions remaining from the Chinese Civil War and the ongoing Sino-Japanese War, the family had sent two daughters to live with family in Pi, while Xu and the other five children moved to Puyang Village outside Xi'an.

After two months without communication from Song Qiyun, in November 1941 Xu Linxia took the eight-month old Song Zhenzhong to Chongqing after hearing that he was awaiting them in the city. There, the two were captured by the KMT. Over the next seven years, mother and son moved between internment camps. At the Xifeng concentration camp in Xifeng County, Guizhou, they reconnected with Song Qiyun; he had also been captured, and Director Zhou Yanghao had been petitioned to allow the family contact by the secret CCP cell under Luo Shiwen. Hunger strikes later allowed for an education for Song, with Huang Xiansheng acting as teacher.

As he aged, Song was nicknamed "Little Radish Head" due to his large head and emaciated frame resulting from malnutrition in the camp. The Xifeng concentration camp was closed in 1946, and Song was transferred with his family to Chongqing. There, due to his youth, he was allowed high levels of mobility. Consequently, fellow inmate Mei Hanzhang recalled that he was often entrusted with passing messages between prisoners. In his memoirs, Han Zidong wrote that Song had brought him bags and clothes sewn by Xu, which Han subsequently used during his escape.

In an interview with the China News Service, Song Zhenzhong's eldest brother Zhenhua recalled that the siblings' first correspondence with their incarcerated family was a letter received in 1947, at which point the Songs had been moved to Ciqikou, Chongqing. Correspondence continued until the Lunar New Year of 1949, with one letter including the words "brother" and "sister" written by Song Zhenzhong. In her last letter, Xu Linxia indicated that Song Qiyun and Yang Hucheng had travelled to Guiyang, and that she and the youngest Song would be following.

With the Chinese Civil War approaching its end, Song Qiyun, Xu Linxia, and Song Zhenzhong were killed by the KMT in Geleshan on 6 September 1949; this was announced by the Central Committee of the CCP in a letter of condolence published in newspapers two months later. In 1950, they were reinterred at the General Yang Hucheng Cemetery in Chang'an District, Xi'an. Their graves occupy three spots on the bottom of this two-storey site; the top level is occupied by the graves of Yang Hucheng, his wife Xie Baozhen and their daughter Yang Zhenggui (buried together), and their son Yang Zhengzhong.

== Legacy ==
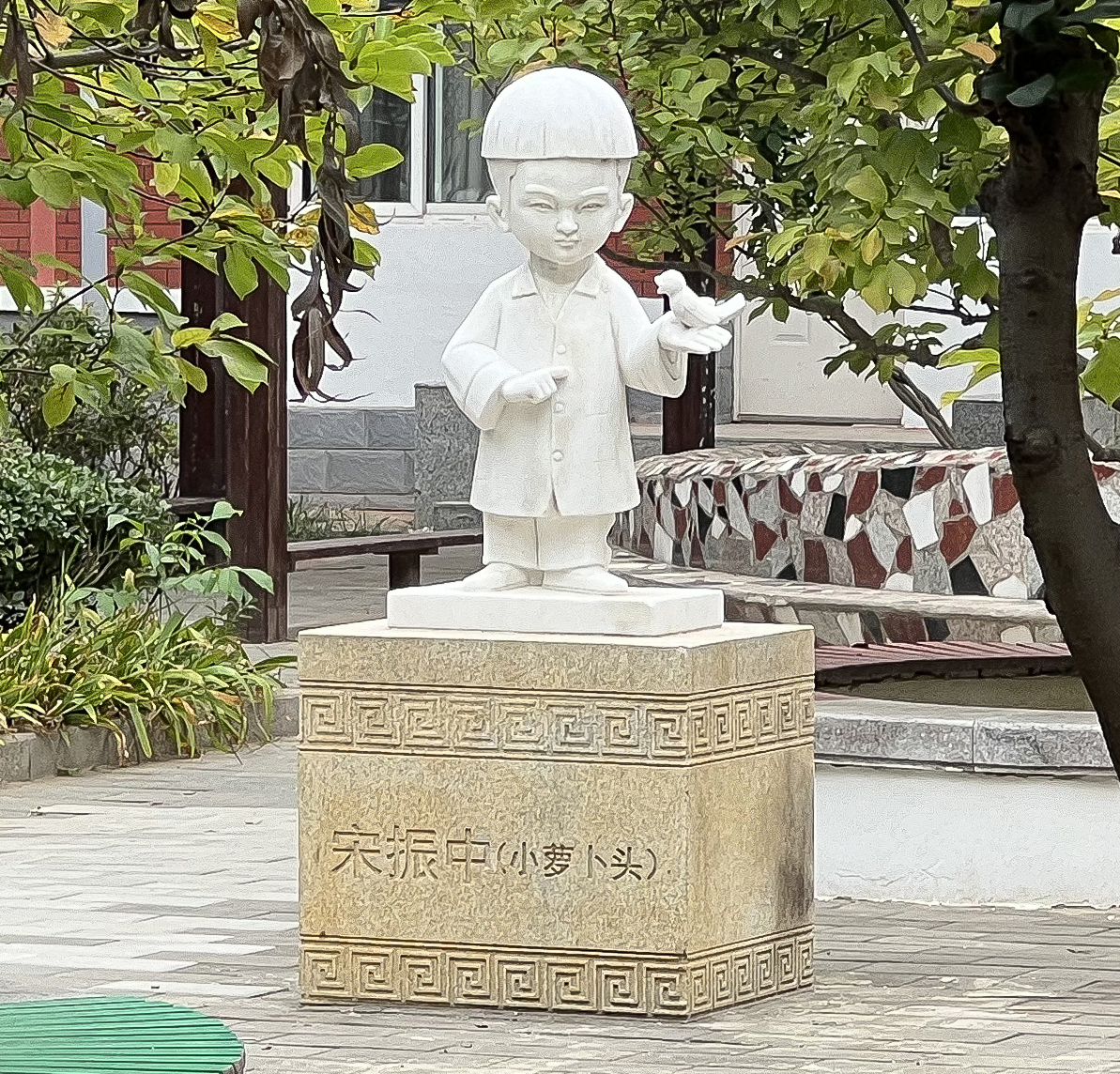
A statue of Song in Shangzhuang, Beijing

Song has been identified as the youngest martyr of the CCP. He is one of several youths given the title of martyr. Others included Liu Hulan, who inspired Mao Zedong's slogan "A great life, a glorious death"; (Note: Original: ｢生的偉大, 死的光榮｣.) Liu Wenxue, who was killed by a landlord whom he caught stealing crops; and Wang Erxiao, a cowherd who detained advancing Japanese troops long enough for his peers to escape. In June 1955, Yang Jinxing, a KMT officer in Geleshan in 1949, was arrested by the Chongqing Public Security Department and charged with the murder of Song Zhenzhong and his parents. Yang had changed his name and hidden for many years before being arrested. After interrogation and public trial by the Chongqing Intermediate People's Court, he was sentenced to death and executed immediately.

Song's story was incorporated into Luo Guangbin and Yang Yiyan's 1961 novel Red Crag, in which he is depicted as a cute and spry child who yearns to live freely after being raised in prison. In subsequent years, "Little Radish Head" became a household name. His surviving sister Song Zhensu published a story, My Brother, Little Radish Head (我的弟弟"小萝卜头"), in 1964. Presenting Song as a child intent on learning communist values from other inmates, it portrays him as learning to hate the KMT and desire their eradication. Also that year, the novel Red Crag was adapted to film as Eternity in Flames (烈火中永生); Song was portrayed by the child actress Fang Shu, who remained identified with the role into the 1990s.

Li Linying's novel Little Radish Head (小蘿蔔頭) and Zhou Mi's film script Little Radish Fantasy Poem (小萝卜头幻想诗, 1984) both present Song as an innocent child trapped by his repressive internment. In 1996, Xue Jiatai published a biography of Song targeted at younger readers. Intended as a means of political education, the book presents its depiction of Song's suffering and death as a dark moment before the dawn of the People's Republic of China. A dramatic stage adaptation by Liu Qinglai, drawing from Red Crag and My Brother, Little Radish Head, was produced later that decade. The Yunnan Arts Institute made a musical based on Song's life in 2019. A three-part documentary on Song's life was screened by CCTV-4 on 30 May 2018 to commemorate National Children's Day.

Song is commemorated with his father and mother with the Xiaoluobotou Memorial Hall in Pizhou, Xuzhou, Jiangsu. Constructed between 2003 and 2005, this hall is used for political education, with students asked to compare their lives with that of Song Zhenzhong. It covers 2,160 square metres (23,300 sq ft), with exhibitions including photographs as well as artefacts belonging to the family. The General Yang Hucheng Cemetery, a tourist attraction that has received a rating of 3A, is regularly visited by schoolchildren who clean the tombs. In front of Song's tomb is a large pomegranate tree, planted by his sister Song Zhenping in 1984, upon which children drape their red scarves after doing a Young Pioneers salute; the state-published People's Daily describes it as "a link between future generations and the martyrs." (Note: Original: ｢（这棵石榴树）成了后人与烈士相连的纽带｣.) Statues of the Song family have been erected at the site of their killing, with that of Song Zhenzhong often draped in red scarves.

== Works cited ==
- Chen Xianfu (陈显涪) (30 August 2024). 刽子手杨进兴逃到川北农村 和老婆吵架露出了马脚 [Murderer Yang Jinxing Fled to the Rural Area of Northern Sichuan; His True Identity was Exposed when He Quarreled with His Wife]. Chongqing Morning News (in Chinese).
- 中国电影明星录 [Chinese Movie Stars] (in Chinese). Xueyuan Publishing House. 1990. ISBN 978-7-5077-0260-6.
- Dong Xianji (董献吉) (1994). 徐州市志 [Xuzhou City Annals] (in Chinese). Vol. 2. Zhonghua Book Company. ISBN 978-7-101-01288-0.
- Du Rong (杜荣), ed. (26 March 2020). 杨虎城将军陵园 [General Yang Hucheng Cemetery] (in Chinese). Xi'an Municipal Government.
- Gao Yimeng (高艺萌) (30 September 2019). 音乐剧《小萝卜头》在昆首演 [The Musical "Little Radish Head" Premieres in Kunming to Celebrate the 70th Anniversary of the Founding of New China] (in Chinese). Yunnan Municipal Government. Archived from the original on 26 October 2021.
- 杨虎城将军陵园:重温"红领巾树"的故事 [General Yang Hucheng Cemetery: Revisiting the Story of the "Red Scarf Tree"]. People's Daily (in Chinese). 29 September 2014.
- Jiang Shan (江山), Hu Minxin (胡民新) Huang Chaozhang (黄朝章) (n.d.). 宋绮云 [Song Qiyun] (in Chinese). Shaanxi Provincial Government.
- Kauffman, Andrew (2020). "Imagining the New Socialist Child: The Cultural Afterlife of the Child Martyr Wang Erxiao". Cross-Currents: East Asian History and Culture Review. 9: 269–296. doi:10.1353/ach.2020.0006.
- Lu Jieyu (吕洁宇) (2021). "小萝卜头"文学形象的传播与时代价值的弘扬 [The Dissemination of the Literary Image of "Little Radish Head" and the Promotion of Contemporary Values]. Journal of Qujing Normal University (in Chinese). 40 (4): 49.
- "小萝卜头"宋振中的纪念馆在江苏邳州市建成 [Memorial Hall for "Little Radish Head" Song Zhenzhong Completed in Pizhou, Jiangsu] (in Chinese). Government of China. 28 December 2005. Archived from the original on 26 October 2021.
- Qiu Bingqing (邱冰清) (13 June 2019). 宋綺雲 徐林俠: 獄中8年不低頭 [Song Qiyun and Xu Linxia: Not Bowing Down after 8 Years in Prison]. People's Daily (in Chinese). p. 16.
- 宋绮云、徐林侠: 革命伴侣共谱赞歌 [Song Qiyun and Xu Linxia: Revolutionary Partners who Composed Hymns Together]. Guangming Daily (in Chinese). 24 May 2019.
- 宋绮云在息烽集中营的铁窗岁月 [Song Qiyun's Years Behind Bars in Xifeng Concentration Camp]. Xifeng Concentration Camp Revolutionary History Memorial Hall. 25 February 2021 – via Xifeng County Government.
- Zhang Jingshu (张静姝) (24 May 2019). 宋绮云、徐林侠: 革命伴侣共谱赞歌 [The Short but Brilliant Eight-Year Life of "Little Radish Head" Song Zhenzhong]. Beijing News (in Chinese). China News Service.
- Zhang Nan (张楠) (31 May 2018). 六一儿童节之际 南影厂纪录片《小萝卜头》登陆央视 [On the Occasion of Children's Day, the Documentary "Little Radish Head" by the Nanjing Film Studio was Released on CCTV] (in Chinese). 人民网. Archived from the original on 22 October 2021.
