= Luo Shiwen =

Chinese Communist (1904–1946)

- 罗世文
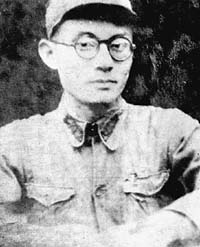
- Born: August 1904; Weiyuan County, Sichuan, China
- Died: 18 August 1946 (aged 41–42); Chongqing, China
- Cause of death: Execution
- Alma mater: Communist University of the Toilers of the East
- Military career
- Allegiance: Chinese Soviet Republic
- Branch: Chinese Red Army

Chinese name
- Traditional Chinese: 羅世文
- Simplified Chinese: 罗世文
Transcriptions
Standard Mandarin
- Hanyu Pinyin: Luō Shìwén
- Wade–Giles: Lo^{1} Shih^{4}wen^{2}

Luo Shiwen (traditional Chinese: 羅世文; simplified Chinese: 罗世文; pinyin: Luō Shìwén, August 1904 – 18 August 1946) was a Chinese communist. Born in Weiyuan County, Sichuan, he became interested in communism during the May Fourth Movement before joining the Chinese Socialist Youth League in 1923 and the Chinese Communist Party (CCP) in 1925. After three years in the Soviet Union, he returned to China in 1928 and was dispatched to advise General Kuang Jixun when his forces declared themselves part of the Red Army. After several victories against the Kuomintang (KMT), the communist forces were defeated at Kaijiang, and Luo was subsequently sent to provide training in the Sichuan–Shanxi Soviet.

He returned to Sichuan in 1937, working to develop a united front against the encroaching Imperial Japanese Army. Although a Second United Front was established between the KMT and CCP, Luo was arrested by the KMT in March 1940. Imprisoned first at Baigongguan, he was transferred to the Xifeng concentration camp and later led a secret CCP cell there. Luo was executed by the KMT on 18 August 1946. He is commemorated with several monuments, and his story has been told in the 1964 novel Red Crag, its 1965 film adaptation, and a 2021 film.

== Biography ==
=== Early life ===
Luo was born in the village of Guanyingtan, part of Weiyuan County, Sichuan, in August 1904. He was the son of a salt-monger, who went bankrupt the year of his birth and died when Luo was three. Luo attended a church-run school in Chongqing beginning in late 1920, his studies bankrolled by his uncle, then enrolled at the Chongqing Class A Commercial School. At the time, following the May Fourth Movement and in the midst of the New Culture Movement, he and his cousins had begun reading communist publications, having been attracted to the ideology by the Zigong Student Union. As an adult, he took the courtesy name Ziyuan (自元).

In 1923, Luo joined the Chinese Socialist Youth League, becoming its secretary the following year. With peers such as Xiao Chu'nu and Yang Angong, he became involved in activism, including protests conducted as part of the May Thirtieth Movement. In 1925, Luo joined the Chinese Communist Party (CCP); throughout his time with the party, he used numerous pseudonyms, including Sefu (瑟夫), Chemu (澈木), Tasheng (特生), and Shaotang (绍堂). Shortly after joining the party, he was sent to the Soviet Union to study at the Communist University of the Toilers of the East.

Returning to China three years later, Luo was dispatched by the Sichuan CCP branch to work with the 7th Mixed Brigade of the 28th Army in Pengxi. At the time, the CCP was in a state of war against the Kuomintang (KMT) forces led by Generalissimo Chiang Kai-shek. With Luo serving as the political advisor to General Kuang Jixun, the 7th Mixed Brigade – having declared themselves the First Sichuan Route of the Chinese Red Army, and reportedly 3,000 strong at their peak – captured the Pengxi County seat, then moved on to fight in Yingshan and Quxian before being defeated at Kaijiang in a failed bid to capture Maoerzhai. Luo escaped and returned to Chongqing, where he advised the provincial committee of the loss.

=== Communist leadership ===
As the Chinese Civil War escalated, in 1930 the KMT captured and executed much of the CCP's leadership in Sichuan. Luo, having gone underground, reestablished a provincial committee with other surviving communists. At first serving as propaganda director, in 1931 he was made the secretary of the CCP's Sichuan Provincial Committee. Under Luo, the CCP instigated peasant uprisings in Jiangjin, Guanghan, and Liangshan. After the Mukden incident of 18 September 1931, which was followed by the Japanese invasion of Manchuria, Luo began promoting anti-Japanese sentiments while simultaneously inciting more uprisings.

In August 1933, Luo was dispatched by the Central Committee of the CCP to the Sichuan–Shanxi Soviet of the Chinese Soviet Republic to lead its training classes. There, he worked with Liao Chengzhi, teaching introductions to Leninism and – with Liu Ruilong, Fu Zhong, and Hu Manshi – preparing the Young Pioneers Textbook (少先队课本). However, after coming into conflict with Zhang Guotao, he was detained, and remained under surveillance through the Long March. Only after Zhang's Fourth Front Army met with other communist troops was Luo released to the Central Committee. He thereafter spent time teaching at the Red Army School.

As the Imperial Japanese Army moved southward and the Second Sino-Japanese War escalated, in 1937 Luo was sent to meet with Liu Xiang and Pan Wenhua, both of whom were prominent members of Sichuan society. Seeking their support for armed action against the Japanese, Luo proposed a united front to help deter an invasion of the province. Meanwhile, Luo stoked anti-Japanese sentiment in Chengdu and Chongqing, working in conjunction with Zhang Shushi, Che Yaoxian, and Wang Ganqing. With the establishment of a special CCP committee in Sichuan in 1938, Luo served as its secretary; by this point, he was also an editor of the CCP periodical Xinhua Daily.

However, tensions remained high between the CCP and KMT, and after a rice rush in 1940, Dai Li ordered the detention of known communists in Chengdu. Luo was captured by the Bureau of Investigation and Statistics – the KMT's intelligence agency – and tortured, while other communists were buried alive. According to the historian Joshua H. Howard, this was the first arrest of a representative of the Second United Front.

=== Internment and death ===
Initially, Luo was held at Baigongguan in the Geleshan Mountains. However, in late 1940 he was transferred to Xifeng concentration camp. In March 1941, Zhou Yanghao was appointed the camp's director and began implementing a series of reforms. Luo and other CCP members interned at Xifeng used these relaxations to establish a "Secret Cell", under Luo's leadership. This cell, which eventually extended to all CCP members and sympathizers in the camp, used carefully orchestrated resistance to pressure the camp administration to allow barracks to remain open during daytime hours, reduce beatings, and improve food quality. According to the Xifeng Concentration Camp Revolutionary History Memorial Hall, Luo and his fellow communists also sought the well-being of individual prisoners, successfully petitioning camp leadership to allow husband-and-wife Song Qiyun and Xu Linxia to meet regularly. Several members of the group – including Luo – gained positions that enabled them to spread Communist literature, using coded messages in the camp publications Resurrection Weekly (复活周刊) and Yangzheng Weekly (养正周刊), though prisoners continued to be required to prove their dedication to the KMT's ideology.

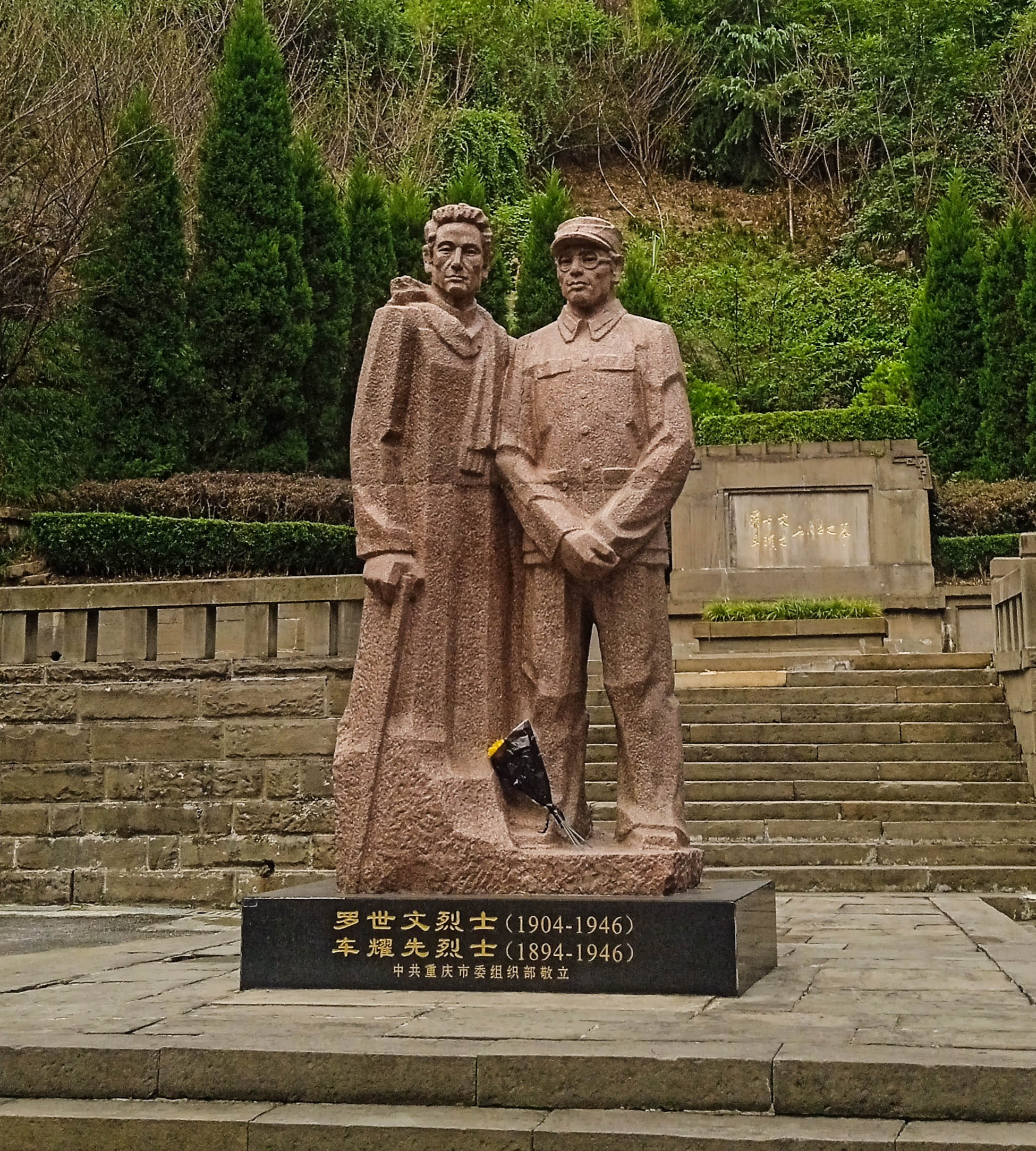
A statue of Che Yaoxian (left) and Luo Shiwen at the former Zhazidong Prison

During negotiations between the CCP and KMT, the CCP inquired about Luo and Che. At the time, he was still held at Xifeng. In July 1946, following the camp's closure, Luo was sent to Zhazidong Prison. He was executed there, together with Che Yaoxian, on 18 August 1946 by Lu Jingqing, the director of Baigongguan prison. His body was subsequently burned to conceal his identity.

== Legacy ==
Following the establishment of the People's Republic of China, Luo was reinterred at Songlinpo by the Chongqing Municipal Government. A memorial hall to him and Che Yaoxian was later constructed at the site. According to the Guangming Daily, an epithet for the two was personally inscribed by President Zhou Enlai upon their reinterment. An exhibition of Luo's handwriting is among the artefacts displayed at the Geleshan Martyrs Cemetery in Shapingba, Chongqing. The Luo Shiwen Martyrs Historical Materials Exhibition Hall, established in 1996 in Neijiang, has been used for patriotic education in the city. As of 2021, efforts are underway to rebuild Luo's former residence in Xiangyi Village, Weiyuan County; the original site is densely populated, and thus a new site was chosen.

Luo may have served as the inspiration for the character Xu Yunfeng in the 1961 novel Red Crag; (Note: Other names proposed include Wang Xiaohe (Roberts & Li 2018, p. 47) and Che Yaoxian (Zuo 2022).) the character was portrayed by Zhao Dan in the book's 1965 film adaptation, Eternity in Flames. In 2021, filming began on Underground Fire (地火), an adaptation of Luo's life directed by Xu Geng that starred Zhao Bo as Luo. In an interview, Zhao identified Red Crag as one of his inspirations in portraying the character. The film premiered in Weiyuan County on 30 June 2022, with intent for a broader theatrical release as well as screening on the China Movie Channel.

== Works cited ==
- 许党为民万事轻——罗世文烈士事迹 [Devoting One's Efforts to the Party and the People is the Least of One's Worries——Deeds of Martyr Luo Shiwen]. The Paper (in Chinese). 2 April 2022.
- Howard, Joshua H. (2004). Workers at War: Labor in China's Arsenals, 1937–1953. Redwood City, California: Stanford University Press. ISBN 978-0-8047-4896-4.
- Kerr, Anne; Wright, Edmund, eds. (2015). "Chinese Civil War (1927–37; 1946–49)". A Dictionary of World History (3rd ed.). Oxford: Oxford University Press. ISBN 978-0-19-968569-1.
- 罗世文 [Luo Shiwen]. Sichuan Annals (in Chinese). Sichuan Provincial Government. 7 December 2017.
- Mühlhahn, Klaus (2009). Criminal Justice in China: A History. Cambridge: Harvard University Press. ISBN 978-0-674-05433-2.
- Mühlhahn, Klaus (2010). "The Concentration Camp in Global Historical Perspective". History Compass. 8 (6): 543–561. doi:10.1111/j.1478-0542.2010.00687.x.
- Roberts, Rosemary; Li, Li, eds. (2018). "How to Tell a Story of Imprisonment: Ideology, Truth, and Melodramatic Body in the Making of Red Crag". The Making and Remaking of China's "Red Classics": Politics, Aesthetics, and Mass Culture. Vol. 1. Hong Kong: Hong Kong University Press. pp. 42–58. doi:10.5790/hongkong/9789888390892.003.0003. ISBN 978-988-8390-89-2.
- Shi Guanghui (石光辉), ed. (15 April 2019). 罗世文：《红岩》英雄许云峰原型 [Luo Shiwen: The Prototype of the Hero Xu Yunfeng in Red Crag]. Guangming Daily (in Chinese) – via Communist Party Member Network.
- 宋绮云在息烽集中营的铁窗岁月 [Song Qiyun's Years Behind Bars in Xifeng Concentration Camp] (in Chinese). Xifeng Concentration Camp Revolutionary History Memorial Hall. 25 February 2021 – via Xifeng County Government.
- Wakeman, Frederic (2003). Spymaster: Dai Li and the Chinese Secret Service. Philip E. Lilienthal book. Berkeley: University of California Press. p. 396. ISBN 978-0-520-23407-9.
- Wang Hongjun (王宏钧) (20 January 2022). 歌乐山烈士陵园 [Geleshan Martyrs Cemetery]. Encyclopaedia of China (in Chinese) (3rd ed.).
- Yu Rubo (余如波), Zheng Zhihao (郑志浩) (1 July 2022). 电影《地火》在威远首映 主创致敬罗世文烈士：就像一位“未曾谋面的老朋友” [The Film "Underground Fire" Premiered in Weiyuan; The Creators Paid Tribute to the Martyr Luo Shiwen: He was Like an "Old Friend I have Never Met"]. Sichuan Online (in Chinese). Sichuan Daily Network Media Development Co., Ltd.
- Zheng Zhihao (郑志浩) (27 January 2021). 走进初心地（1931-1940）| 罗世文烈士史料陈列馆②复建故居、筹拍"影剧" 威远这样讲好先烈红色故事 [Entering the Original Heart (1931–1940)| Luo Shiwen Martyrs Historical Materials Exhibition Hall, Reconstructing His Former Residence, and Preparing to Shoot a "Film and Drama", Weiyuan tells the Red Story of the Martyrs Well]. Sichuan Online (in Chinese). Sichuan Daily Network Media Development Co., Ltd.
- Zuo Heng (左衡) (29 October 2022). 电影《烈火中永生》这样诞生 [How the Movie "Forever in Flames" was Born]. People's Daily (in Chinese). China Communist Party News Network.
