= Xu Linxia =

Chinese communist (1904/5–1949)

- 徐林侠
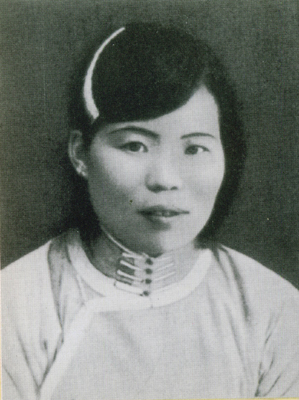
- Born: 1904 or 1905; Pi County, Jiangsu, China
- Died: 6 September 1949; Chongqing, China
- Spouse: Song Qiyun
- Children: 7, including Song Zhenzhong

Chinese name
- Chinese: 徐林侠
Transcriptions
Standard Mandarin
- Hanyu Pinyin: Xú Línxiá
- Wade–Giles: Hsü^{2} Lin^{2}hsia^{2}

Xu Linxia (Chinese: 徐林侠; pinyin: Xú Línxiá; 1904/1905 – 6 September 1949) was a Chinese communist. Born in Pi County, she attended the No. 3 Normal School before joining the Kuomintang (KMT). After the dissolution of the First United Front, she joined the Chinese Communist Party (CCP), becoming a leader of its women's branch in Pi. She married Song Qiyun in 1928, and the couple had seven children. Xu was detained by the KMT in 1941, together with her youngest son Song Zhenzhong; her husband was also arrested that year. The three were executed in 1949. Xu has been recognized by the CCP with the title of revolutionary martyr.

== Biography ==
=== Early life and Communist activities ===
Xu Linxia was born in Pi County, Jiangsu, in 1904 or 1905, and enrolled at the No. 1 Girls' Primary School. She attended the No. 3 Women's Normal School beginning in 1924. She was also known by the name Xu Lifang (徐丽芳), and was reported to have refused an arranged marriage in her youth.

In 1925, during the First United Front that saw the Kuomintang (KMT) allied with the Chinese Communist Party (CCP), Xu joined the KMT. She was dispatched to Wuhan for cadre training the following year. After the dissolution of the United Front, Xu joined the CCP. She was one of the CCP cadres who fought against General Xia Douyin when he attempted to capture Wuhan.

By 1928, she was a member of the CCP Committee for Pi County, as well as the president of its Women's Association. She married Song Qiyun, a fellow CCP member, in October of that year; they had met several years earlier, in Wuhan. According to the Provincial Government of Shaanxi, she had been detained by the KMT when it disbanded the Pi County CCP. The book Chinese Women Heroes (中华女英烈) indicates that Xu was pregnant at the time and withstood torture while held at Suzhou Prison.

Xu was eventually released and reunited with Song. The couple moved to Xi'an, where Song became the editor-in-chief of the Northwest Cultural Daily, Meanwhile, Xu withdrew from the public eye, even as she also advanced efforts to challenge the encroaching Imperial Japanese Army. As the situation in China became more dangerous, the family sent two daughters to live with family in Pi. The remaining five children lived with Xu in Puyang Village outside Xi'an. These included Song Zhenzhong, who was born on 15 March 1941. Song Qiyun was rarely home, and after two months without communication from him, in November 1941 Xu Linxia took her eight-month old son to Chongqing after hearing that he was awaiting them in the city. This journey concluded with Xu and Song being captured by the KMT.

=== Internment and death ===
Xu and Song Zhenzhong were initially held in Chongqing, but by March 1943 they had been transferred to the Xifeng concentration camp. Mother and son were held together in the women's block, initially not knowing that Song Qiyun – who had been captured in mid-1941 – was held there. However, according to the Xifeng Concentration Camp Revolutionary History Memorial Hall, once Song had gained the trust of the camp's secret CCP organization under Luo Shiwen, his fellow prisoners petitioned Camp Director Zhou Yanghao to allow for weekly interactions. As part of the camp's "corrective labour" regime, Xu sewed clothes and shoes.

After the Xifeng camp closed in 1946, the family were transferred to Ciqikou, Chongqing. Xu continued her sewing; in his memoirs, Han Zidong recalled that she had prepared bags and clothes for him that he used during his successful escape. Conditions were cramped, and Xu and her son shared a room with four other women and their children. In 1947, the family re-established contact with their children outside the internment camp, exchanging letters up through Lunar New Year 1949. In her last letter to the children, Xu indicated that she and Song Zhenzhong would be leaving for Guiyang, with Song Qiyun having already departed with General Yang Hucheng. In an interview with the China News Service, Xu's eldest son Song Zhenhua recalled that her writing was ragged, and said that he later learned that she had gone blind and experienced mobility issues.

On 6 September 1949, Xu was executed together with her husband and son in Geleshan. Her family learned of their deaths two months later, after the Central Committee of the CCP published a letter of condolence in local newspapers. In 1950, the three were reinterred at the General Yang Hucheng Cemetery in Chang'an District, Xi'an. Their graves occupy three spots on the bottom of this two-storey site, with the top level occupied by the graves of Yang Hucheng and his family.

== Legacy ==
Xu has been recognized by the CCP as a revolutionary martyr. Song, Xu, and their son are commemorated with Xiaoluotou Memorial Hall in Pizhou, Xuzhou, Jiangsu. Constructed between 2003 and 2005, this hall is used for political education, with students asked to compare their lives with that of Song Zhenzhong. Statues of the Song family have also been erected at their execution site. The General Yang Hucheng Cemetery, where the family are interred, is regularly visited by schoolchildren who clean the tombs; it has received a tourist attraction rating of 3A.

== Works cited ==
- 中华英烈词典, 1840–1990 [Dictionary of Chinese Heroes and Martyrs, 1840–1990] (in Chinese). Military Translation Publishing House. 1991. ISBN 978-7-80027-131-1.
- 中华女英烈 [Chinese Women Heroes] (in Chinese). Beijing: Wenwu Publishing House. 1988.
- Dong Xianji (董献吉) (1994). 徐州市志 [Xuzhou City Annals] (in Chinese). Vol. 2. Zhonghua Book Company. ISBN 978-7-101-01288-0.
- Du Rong (杜荣), ed. (26 March 2020). 杨虎城将军陵园 [General Yang Hucheng Cemetery] (in Chinese). Xi'an Municipal Government. Archived from the original on 16 October 2024.
- 杨虎城将军陵园:重温"红领巾树"的故事 [General Yang Hucheng Cemetery: Revisiting the story of the "Red Scarf Tree"]. People's Daily (in Chinese). 29 September 2014. Archived from the original on 16 October 2024.
- Jiang Shan (江山), Hu Minxin (胡民新) Huang Chaozhang (黄朝章) (n.d.). 宋绮云 [Song Qiyun] (in Chinese). Shaanxi Provincial Government. Archived from the original on 15 October 2024.
- Qiu Bingqing (邱冰清) (13 June 2019). 宋綺雲 徐林俠：獄中8年不低頭 [Song Qiyun and Xu Linxia: Not Bowing Down after 8 Years in Prison]. People's Daily (in Chinese). p. 16. Archived from the original on 15 October 2024.
- 宋绮云在息烽集中营的铁窗岁月 [Song Qiyun's Years Behind Bars in Xifeng Concentration Camp]. Xifeng Concentration Camp Revolutionary History Memorial Hall. 25 February 2021. Archived from the original on 15 October 2024 – via Xifeng County Government.
- 宋绮云、徐林侠：革命伴侣共谱赞歌 [Song Qiyun and Xu Linxia: Revolutionary Partners who Composed Hymns Together]. Guangming Daily (in Chinese). 24 May 2019. Archived from the original on 15 October 2024.
- 中國妇女名人录 [Who's Who of Chinese Women] (in Chinese). Shaanxi People's Publishing House. 1988. ISBN 978-7-224-00090-0.
- Xu Jianhua (徐建华) (2002). 中华姓氏通史: 徐姓 [A General History of Chinese Surnames: Xu] (in Chinese). Oriental Publishing House. ISBN 978-7-5060-1582-0.
- Zhang Jingshu (张静姝) (24 May 2019). 宋绮云、徐林侠：革命伴侣共谱赞歌 [The Short but Brilliant Eight-Year Life of "Little Radish Head" Song Zhenzhong]. Beijing News (in Chinese). China News Service. Archived from the original on 15 October 2024.
