= Yang Hucheng =

Chinese general (1893–1949)

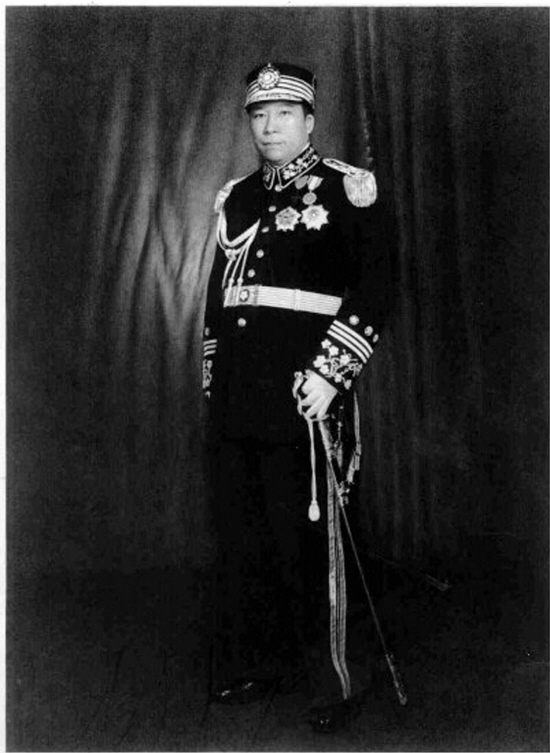
- Yang Hucheng

Personal details
- Born: 26 November 1893 Pucheng County, Shaanxi, Qing dynasty
- Died: 6 September 1949 (aged 55) Chongqing, Republic of China
- Party: Kuomintang (1924 — 10 June 1949)

Military service
- Allegiance: Republic of China
- Branch/service: National Revolutionary Army Ground Forces

Yang Hucheng (traditional Chinese: 楊虎城; simplified Chinese: 杨虎城; pinyin: Yáng Hǔchéng; Wade–Giles: Yang Hu-ch'eng) (26 November 1893 – 6 September 1949) was a Chinese general during the Warlord Era of Republican China and Kuomintang (KMT) general during the Chinese Civil War. He was a main supporter of Zhang Xueliang during the Xi'an Incident in late 1936, when the two generals plotted to force Chiang Kai-shek to cease hostilities against the Chinese Red Army and agree to a Second United Front against Japanese incursions into China with the Chinese Communist Party. In retaliation of his involvement in the incident, Yang was forced into exile by Chiang and then imprisoned by the Nationalist spy agency Juntong for 12 years, before being killed along with two of his children, his secretary Song Qiyun and Song's wife and youngest son in September 1949.

== Warlord years ==
Yang Hucheng joined the Xinhai Revolution in his youth and had become a popular warlord of Shaanxi Province by 1926. Following the defeat of Feng Yuxiang and Yan Xishan in the Central Plains War of 1930, Yang allied himself with the Kuomintang's Republic of China government (the Nanjing Nationalist government), and became commander of the Kuomintang's Northwestern Army. Ordered to destroy the newly established Chinese Communist Party (CCP) stronghold at Yan'an with Zhang Xueliang's Northeastern Army in 1935, both Yang and Zhang were impressed with the Communists' determined defense and fighting capabilities. They were also convinced by the CCP proposal for a united Chinese defense against the Japanese invasion of China, in contrast to the Kuomintang strategy of "first internal pacification, then external resistance", a policy under which the encroaching Japanese forces were appeased in order to buy time to defeat the CCP.

== Xi'an Incident ==
In November 1936, Kuomintang chairman Chiang Kai-shek flew to Xi'an in early December to speak to troops under the command of Yang and Zhang who no longer wanted to fight the CCP. On the night of December 12, 1936, bodyguards of Yang and Zhang stormed the cabin where Chiang was sleeping and attempted to arrest him. Although Chiang managed to initially evade capture, he was injured in the process and was arrested the following morning by Zhang's forces.

Yang and Zhang forced Chiang into negotiations with CCP representatives Zhou Enlai and Lin Boqu, which resulted in peace between the Nationalists and Communists and the Second United Front against the Japanese invasion, with Chiang taking command of the CCP forces. In the aftermath, Zhang Xueliang returned to Nanjing with Chiang Kai-Shek, where he was arrested upon their arrival, and Yang was later secretly arrested. For a time, he was detained at Xifeng concentration camp, which closed in 1946.

== Imprisonment and extrajudicial killing ==
Yang remained imprisoned in Chongqing throughout the rest of the Second Sino-Japanese War. During his imprisonment, his youngest daughter Yang Zhenggui (杨拯贵) was born in 1941 in captivity, and his wife Xie Baozhen (谢葆真) died in early 1947 after protesting with hunger strike. In 1949, acting Chinese president Li Zongren, who favored negotiations with the CCP, ordered the release of Yang Hucheng, but the order was not implemented. On 10 June, the Central Supervisory Committee of the Kuomintang decided to permanently expel Yang from the party.

Shortly after the Communist capture of the capital Nanking (Nanjing) near the end of the Chinese Civil War, the KMT army prepared to abandon Chongqing, where Yang was imprisoned. On 6 September 1949, on the orders of Chiang Kai-Shek to exterminate political prisoners, Yang Hucheng was killed extrajudicially by Juntong spies, who stabbed him repeatedly to death alongside his youngest son Yang Zhengzhong (杨拯中) and 8-year-old daughter Zhenggui, his secretary Song Qiyun (宋绮云), Song's wife Xu Linxia (徐林侠) and their 8-year-old son Song Zhenzhong (宋振中) at the Sino-American Cooperative Organization headquarters in Geleshan, Chongqing. The six victims' bodies were then anonymously disposed, reportedly by nitric acid dissolution. Some of Yang's officers, including his deputy Yan Jiming (阎继明) and bodyguard Zhang Xingmin (张醒民), were also killed during the KMT's massacre of political prisoners in November that same year, shortly before the People's Liberation Army's capture of Chongqing.

After the founding of the People's Republic of China, the salvaged remains of Yang and his family and associates were buried in what is now the Yang Hucheng Martyrs' Cemetery (杨虎城烈士陵园) in Chang'an District, Xi'an, in a funeral officiated by Peng Dehuai. Some of Yang's surviving family members joined the CCP and became high-ranking officials in the Government of the People's Republic of China.

In June 1955, Yang Jinxing, a KMT officer who had implemented the order to kill Yang Hucheng in Geleshan in 1949, was arrested by the Chongqing Public Security Department and charged with the murder of Yang Hucheng and others. Jixing had changed his name and hidden for many years before being arrested. After interrogation and public trial by the Chongqing Intermediate People's Court, he was sentenced to death and killed immediately.

== Legacy ==
=== Mainland China ===
The Chinese Communist Party hold Yang Hucheng in very high esteem, calling him a "famous patriot general" whose "sacrifice in promoting the united front and resistance against the Japanese cannot be erased". Mao Zedong had personally praised Yang as "dying for an ideal, and thus great (以身殉志，不亦伟乎！)".

Yang's old family residence in Pucheng and the prison camp where he died, are now heritage sites.

=== Taiwan ===
The Kuomintang remained scatheful towards Yang, calling him a "treasonous criminal". When Yang's grandson Yang Han (杨瀚) wrote to Lien Chan and Ma Ying-jeou in 2005 and 2006 seeking rehabilitation to Yang's name, the director of the Kuomintang History Committee responded, "Zhang and Yang, being ROC generals, not only failed to proactively quell communists, but abducted the leader through abnormal methods. Such actions are almost coup d'état, and would be punished even in today's China, thus will not be tolerated, let along the so-called question of 'rehabilitation'." The director of the KMT Central Committee's Mainland Affair Bureau and former deputy secretary-general, Chang Jung-kung (張榮恭), however stated that he was "deeply sympathetic" to what happened to Yang, but "the political environment back then would not allow such action towards Central Government, especially the military leader Mr. Chiang".

Kuo Kuan-ying (郭冠英), a New Party journalist who worked as a biographer of Zhang Xueliang and also a long-time critic of the Kuomintang, stated that "Xi'an Incident was an act of patriotism, and the KMT should actively heal that historical scar".

=== Zhang Xueliang ===
Yang's collaborator Zhang Xueliang was spared from execution due to his close friendship with Chiang Kai-shek's wife Soong Mei-ling, and was placed in house arrest for the next six decades until after the deaths of both Chiang and his son Chiang Ching-kuo. In early 1993, Zhang, who was released by Chiang Ching-kuo's successor Lee Teng-hui in 1990 and had since immigrated to Hawaii, told in an interview that he was the sole instigator of the Xi'an Incident and should bear full responsibility, with Yang merely being his accomplice. On November 25, 1993, Zhang faxed a commemoration to the 100th birthday of Yang, expressing deep sorrow and regret over Yang's death, citing that Yang was a "good man who wanted to be a willing patriot".

Yang Hucheng

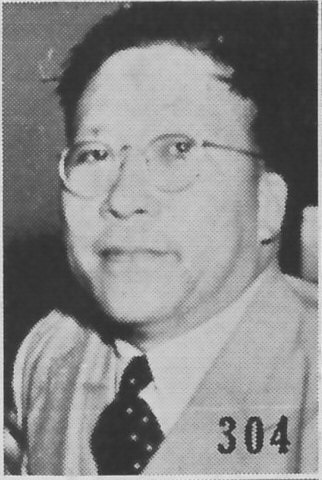
Yang Hucheng

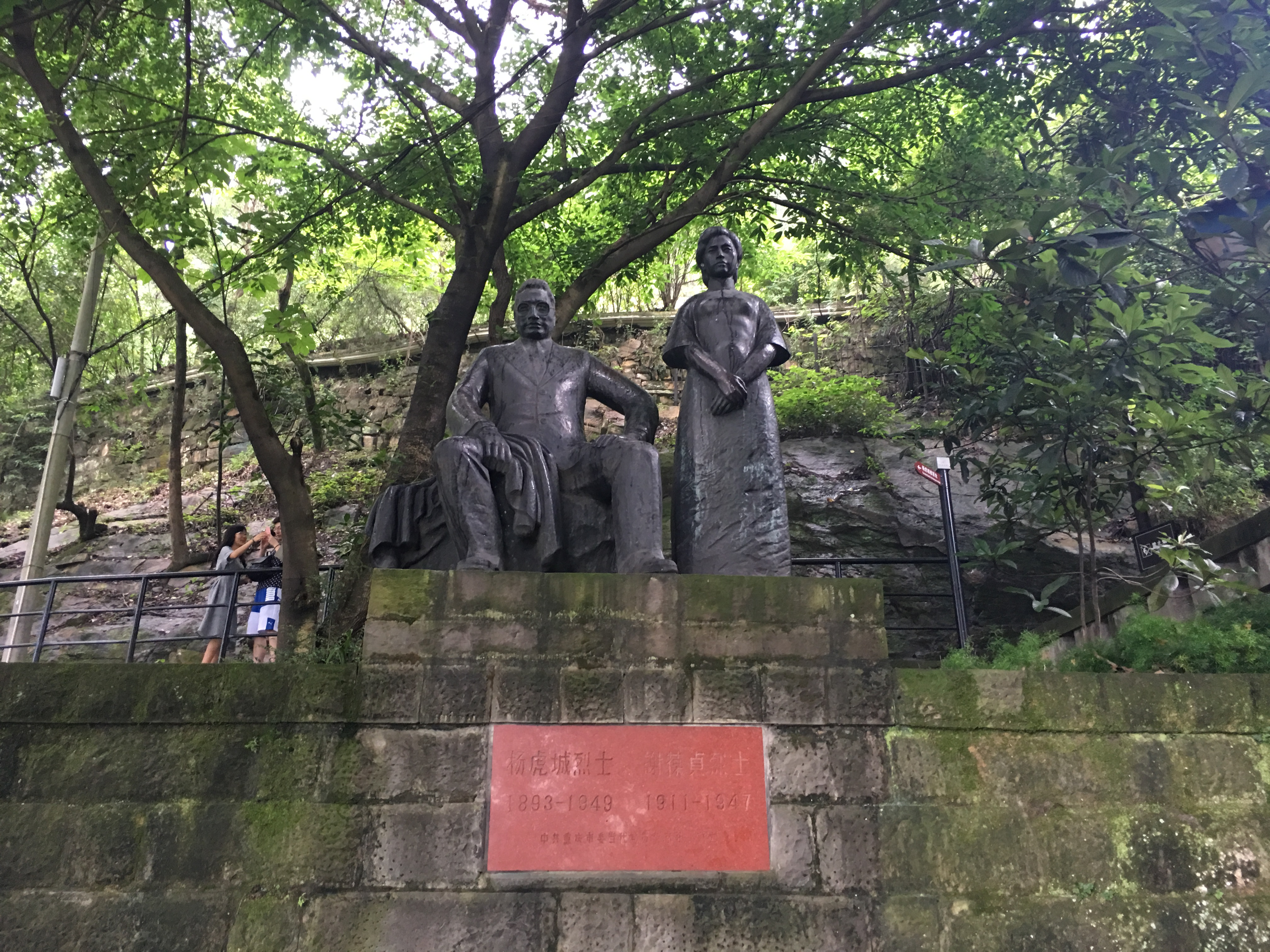
Memorial statue of Yang Hucheng in Gele Mountain (Geleshan), Chongqing
