= Milton E. Miles =

United States Navy admiral (1900–1961)

Milton Edward Miles
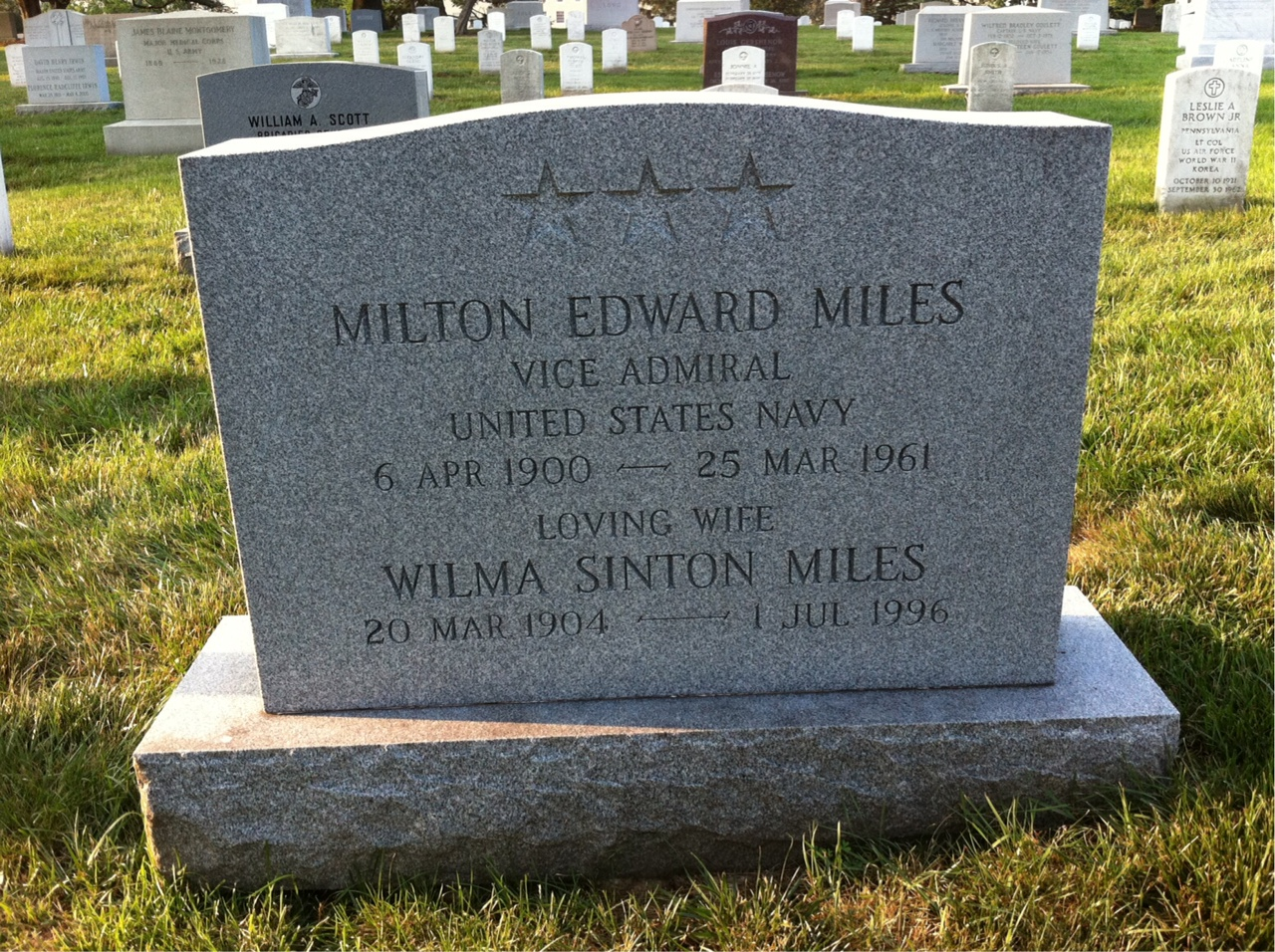
- Grave at Arlington National Cemetery
- Born: April 6, 1900; Jerome, Arizona Territory
- Died: March 25, 1961 (aged 60)
- Military career
- Allegiance: United States of America
- Branch: United States Navy
- Service years: 1917–1958
- Rank: Vice Admiral
- Nickname: Mary
- Commands: USS Columbus (CA-74); Cruiser Division One; Cruiser Division Six; Cruiser Division Four; 15th Naval District; 3rd Naval District
- Conflicts: World War I World War II; Cold War
- Awards: Distinguished Service Medal; Legion of Merit (3)

Milton Edward Miles (April 6, 1900 – March 25, 1961) was a Vice Admiral in the United States Navy, who served in World War II as head of Naval Intelligence operations in China, and later, joint commander of the Sino-American Special Technical Cooperative Organization (SACO).

== Biography ==
Miles was born in Jerome, Arizona Territory, the son of Lewis E. Robbins and Mae Belle Cook, and was the stepson of George A. Miles.

=== Early naval career ===
He joined the United States Navy in 1917 as an apprentice seaman, attending the United States Naval Academy from 1918 to 1922. As a student, Miles was called "Mary" by his classmates, in reference to the silent film star Mary Miles Minter. Commissioned as an ensign, he first served in the Asiatic Fleet, receiving promotion to Lieutenant (junior grade). In 1927–1929 he studied at the Naval Postgraduate School at Annapolis, was promoted to Lieutenant, and received his MS from Columbia University. From 1929 until 1932 he was electrical officer aboard the aircraft carrier Saratoga (CV-3). He was a member of the Navy Department's Bureau of Engineering from 1932 to 1934. He was on destroyer duty in the U.S. Pacific and Asiatic Fleets between 1934 and 1939, receiving promotion to lieutenant commander in 1937.

=== World War II ===
From 1939 to 1942 Miles was a member of the Navy Department Interior Control Board, being promoted to commander and then captain in 1942. In 1942–1943 he served as U.S. Naval Observer, Chongqing, China, and as Chief of OSS (Office of Strategic Services) for the Far East. In 1943–1945 he was deputy director of the Sino-American Cooperative Organization (SACO), and also served as Commander, U.S. Naval Group, China in 1944–1945, receiving the temporary rank of rear admiral in 1945.

=== Post-war ===
In 1946 Miles commanded the heavy cruiser Columbus (CA-74), and in 1947 he was a planning officer on the staff of the Service Force, Atlantic Fleet. He received promotion to rear admiral in 1948 to command Cruiser Division One, and then commanded Cruiser Division Six and Cruiser Division Four in 1949.

Between 1950 and 1954 Miles was the director of Pan American Affairs and U.S. Naval Missions in the Office of the Chief of Naval Operations and Senior Naval Delegate to Inter-American Defense Board. He served as Commandant of the 15th Naval District in the Panama Canal Zone in 1954, and was on-site Commander of "Operation Friendship", a flood relief program at Tampico, Mexico in 1955, in the wake of Hurricane Janet. From 1956 Miles was the Commandant of the 3rd Naval District, based at New York, and also Commander of the U.S. Naval Base, New York. He retired in 1958 with the rank of Vice Admiral.

Miles died on 25 March 1961.

== Publications ==
- Miles, Milton E., A Different Kind of War: The Little-Known Story of the Combined Guerrilla Forces Created in China by the U.S. Navy and the Chinese During World War II (Garden City: Doubleday, 1967)
