= Song Qiyun =

Chinese communist journalist (1904–1949)

- 宋绮云
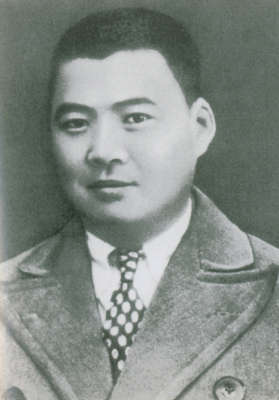
- Born: 1904; Pi County, Jiangsu, China
- Died: 6 September 1949 (aged 44–45); Chongqing, China
- Spouse: Xu Linxia
- Children: 7, including Song Zhenzhong

Chinese name
- Chinese: 宋绮云
Transcriptions
Standard Mandarin
- Hanyu Pinyin: Sòng Qǐyún
- Wade–Giles: Sung^{4} Ch`i^{3}yün^{2}

Song Qiyun (Chinese: 宋绮云; pinyin: Sòng Qǐyún; 1904 – 6 September 1949) was a Chinese journalist and member of the Chinese Communist Party (CCP). Born in Pi County, Jiangsu, to a poor family, he attended the Sixth Normal School but left teaching in 1926 to join the military. As a member of the CCP, he infiltrated the police to gather information on the Kuomintang (KMT) before ultimately joining the 17th Route Army under Yang Hucheng. In this capacity, he served as the editor-in-chief of the Northwest Cultural Daily from 1930 to 1937. Detained by the KMT in 1941, he was imprisoned with his wife Xu Linxia and youngest son Song Zhenzhong, with whom he was executed in 1949.

== Biography ==
=== Early life ===
Song was born to a peasant family in Gaotang Village, Pi County, Jiangsu, in 1904. His parents, though poor, saved enough money for him to attend Tushan Fengyang School beginning in 1917. Amidst the 4 May Movement, he began reading revolutionary materials. After graduating in 1920, he travelled to Qingjiang (now Huai'an) to attend the Sixth Normal School. At the time, warlordism was rampant, and Jiangsu was under the influence of Ma Yuren; Song participated in several discussions that challenged the warlords with his fellow students. To support himself, he worked as a handyman at a local tea shop.

Graduating in 1925, Song returned to Pi County and became a teacher at Tushan Fengyang School. Hearing from his classmate Guo Zihua that the National Revolutionary Army had captured Wuhan as part of its Northern Expedition, in late 1926 Song decided to leave teaching and enter the military. He joined the Chinese Communist Party (CCP) in March 1927. The following month, the Kuomintang (KMT) executed a massacre of communists in Shanghai, thereby breaking the parties' First United Front. That May, Song joined General Ye Ting in his counteroffensive to General Xia Douyin's attempt to capture Wuhan. That August, he and his fellow soldiers attempted to participate in the Nanchang uprising, but arrived after CCP forces had already withdrawn from the city.

=== Communist activities ===
Song was subsequently tasked with travelling to Nanjing, where he was tasked with infiltrating the police and collecting information on KMT operations; he continued to attend CCP meetings, wearing his police uniform, which disguised the purpose of these gatherings. As the cell was unravelled in early 1928, Song became aware of an order to arrest Song Richang and warned his fellow Communist, thwarting the arrest. For fear that he had exposed himself, Song was subsequently transferred back to Pi County, where he joined the Special Branch of the CCP under Li Chaoshi. When Li was transferred to Donghai County, Song assumed leadership of the special branch. He subsequently became secretary when the CCP established a governing committee in the county, which at the time had minimal KMT presence. Song married Xu Linxia, a fellow CCP member and leader of the Pi County Women's Branch, in October 1928.

As in Nanjing, Song was tasked with infiltrating the local security forces, through which he began recruiting potential CCP members. The KMT, aware of the growing CCP presence in the region, dispatched Duan Muzhen to Pi to arrest suspected communists. More than a dozen CCP members were arrested, and Song fled to Tushan. In 1929, he left for Beijing, where he spent time attending lectures and writing for the Ta Kung Pao before becoming attached to the army of General Yang Hucheng in Nanyang. Although Song has been reported to have acted as Yang's secretary, his peer Cao Lengquan writes that he did not serve in this capacity.

While associated with Yang's army, Song was extensively involved in journalism. In 1930 he served as the editor-in-chief of the Wannan Daily; he later became the editor-in-chief of the Northwest Cultural Daily, a publication of the 17th Route Army. Under Song's leadership, which lasted until his departure from the publication in 1937, the Northwest Cultural Daily expanded to reach a readership of several thousand and include several supplementals, including a pictorial. Song recruited numerous communists to work for the newspaper, and published coverage that was critical of KMT leader Generalissimo Chiang Kai-shek. He also operated a safe house, which housed CCP members fleeing the KMT. Ultimately, after the 1937 Xi'an Incident – for which Song helped draft the "Eight Proposals for Resisting Japan and Saving the Nation" – General Yang was sent abroad; Song, meanwhile, was compelled to leave the 17th Route Army.

=== Later years and death ===
After a brief time in Hebei, Song went to Xi'an to act as a military instructor in 1939. In July 1941, he received a telegram urging him to return to his family's home. There, he was captured by the KMT and held as an ally of Yang Hucheng. At the time, he and Xu Linxia had sent two of their daughters to stay with family, while the remaining five children stayed with her in Puyang Village, outside Xi'an.

Song was initially sent to the Baigongguan Prison in Chongqing. In March 1943, he was transferred to Xifeng concentration camp together with his wife Xu Linxia and his youngest son Song Zhenzhong. According to the Xifeng Concentration Camp Revolutionary History Memorial Hall, the couple were initially unable to maintain contact, as Xu was held at a portion of the camp reserved for women; however, after Song gained the support of the secret CCP cell under Luo Shiwen, Director Zhou Yanghao was convinced to allow them weekly interactions.

After the Xifeng concentration camp was dissolved in 1946, Song and his family were returned to Chongqing. On 6 September 1949, Song and his family were executed by the KMT in Chongqing. Also executed were Yang Hucheng, his wife, and two of their children. The family were reinterred at the General Yang Hucheng Cemetery in Chang'an District, Xi'an, in 1950. Their graves occupy three spots on the bottom of this two-storey site; the top level is occupied by the graves of Yang Hucheng and his family.

== Legacy ==
Song, Xu, and their son are commemorated with Xiaoluotou Memorial Hall in Pizhou, Xuzhou, Jiangsu. Constructed between 2003 and 2005, this hall is used for political education, with students asked to compare their lives with that of Song Zhenzhong. Statues of the Song family have been erected at their execution site in Geleshan. The General Yang Hucheng Cemetery, a tourist attraction that has received a rating of 3A, is regularly visited by schoolchildren who clean the tombs.

== Works cited ==
- Cao Lengquan (曹冷泉) (20 November 1980). 宋绮云 [Song Qiyun]. Shaanxi Literature and History Materials (in Chinese). 17. Archived from the original on 15 October 2024 – via Shaanxi Provincial Department of Culture.
- Du Rong (杜荣), ed. (26 March 2020). 杨虎城将军陵园 [General Yang Hucheng Cemetery] (in Chinese). Xi'an Municipal Government. Archived from the original on 16 October 2024.
- 杨虎城将军陵园:重温"红领巾树"的故事 [General Yang Hucheng Cemetery: Revisiting the story of the "Red Scarf Tree"]. People's Daily (in Chinese). 29 September 2014. Archived from the original on 16 October 2024.
- Jiang Shan (江山), Hu Minxin (胡民新) Huang Chaozhang (黄朝章) (n.d.). 宋绮云 [Song Qiyun] (in Chinese). Shaanxi Provincial Government. Archived from the original on 15 October 2024.
- Qiu Bingqing (邱冰清) (13 June 2019). 宋綺雲 徐林俠：獄中8年不低頭 [Song Qiyun and Xu Linxia: Not Bowing Down after 8 Years in Prison]. People's Daily (in Chinese). p. 16. Archived from the original on 15 October 2024.
- 宋绮云在息烽集中营的铁窗岁月 [Song Qiyun's Years Behind Bars in Xifeng Concentration Camp]. Xifeng Concentration Camp Revolutionary History Memorial Hall. 25 February 2021. Archived from the original on 15 October 2024 – via Xifeng County Government.
- 宋绮云、徐林侠：革命伴侣共谱赞歌 [Song Qiyun and Xu Linxia: Revolutionary Partners who Composed Hymns Together]. Guangming Daily (in Chinese). 24 May 2019. Archived from the original on 15 October 2024.
- Zhang Jingshu (张静姝) (24 May 2019). 宋绮云、徐林侠：革命伴侣共谱赞歌 [The Short but Brilliant Eight-Year Life of "Little Radish Head" Song Zhenzhong]. Beijing News (in Chinese). China News Service. Archived from the original on 15 October 2024.
