= Xinhua Daily Telegraph =

Chinese state newspaper

- Type: Daily newspaper
- Founded: January 1, 1993
- Headquarters: Beijing
- Website: www.xinhuanet.com/mrdx

Xinhua Daily Telegraph
- Simplified Chinese: 新华每日电讯
- Traditional Chinese: 新華每日電訊
- Literal meaning: New China Daily Telegraph
- Hanyu Pinyin: Xīnhuá měirì diànxùn

The Xinhua Daily Telegraph (abbreviated as XDT; Chinese: 新华每日电讯), alternatively translated as the New China Daily Dispatch, Xinhua Daily Newswires, is a China's state-run Chinese newspaper hosted by Xinhua News Agency. Based in Beijing, the newspaper was launched on January 1, 1993, and its predecessor was the Press Release of Xinhua News Agency (新华社新闻稿). Xu Wu was involved in the founding of the paper.

Xinhua Daily Telegraph is published and owned by Xinhua News Agency. On January 1, 2021, it was newly revised, with the word "Xinhua" in the masthead changed to Mao Zedong's handwriting and the "Daily Telegraph" still printed in Song typeface.
