= Xifeng County, Guizhou =

Xifeng County 息烽县
- County
- Location of the seat in Guizhou Xifeng (Southwest China)
- Coordinates: 27°05′25″N 106°44′25″E
- Country: China
- Province: Guizhou
- Prefecture-level city: Guiyang
- County seat: Yongjing

Area
  - Total: 1,037 km^{2} (400 sq mi)

Population (2010)
  - Total: 212,879
  - Density: 205.3/km^{2} (531.7/sq mi)
- Time zone: UTC+8 (China Standard)

Xifeng (Chinese: 息烽; pinyin: Xīfēng) is a county with 250,000 inhabitants under the administration of Guiyang, the capital of Guizhou Province, People's Republic of China. Xifeng has an area of 1,037 km^{2} (400 sq mi). The seat of the county is Yongjing (永靖镇). It is home to many forests, hotsprings, and other tourist attractions.

== Administrative divisions ==
Xifeng County comprises 1 subdistrict, 9 towns and 1 ethnic township:

subdistrict

- Yongyang Subdistrict 永阳街道

towns

- Yongjing Town 永靖镇
- Wenquan Town 温泉镇
- Jiuzhuang Town 九庄镇
- Xiaozhaiba Town 小寨坝镇
- Xishan Town 西山镇
- Yanglongsi Town 养龙司镇
- Shidong Town 石硐镇
- Luwo Town 鹿窝镇
- Liuchang Town 流长镇

ethnic township

- Qingshan Miao Ethnic Township 青山苗族乡

== Sights ==
- Xifeng concentration camp, now a memorial to those imprisoned and killed by the Kuomintang there between 1937 and 1948.
- Wujiang Gorge

== Transportation ==
- China National Highway 210

== Climate ==
Climate data for Xifeng, elevation 1,112 m (3,648 ft), (1991–2020 normals, extremes 1981–present)
Month	Jan	Feb	Mar	Apr	May	Jun	Jul	Aug	Sep	Oct	Nov	Dec	Year
Record high °C (°F)	23.2 (73.8)	30.7 (87.3)	32.5 (90.5)	34.3 (93.7)	35.9 (96.6)	33.9 (93.0)	35.7 (96.3)	35.7 (96.3)	35.1 (95.2)	30.7 (87.3)	27.8 (82.0)	22.7 (72.9)	35.9 (96.6)
Mean daily maximum °C (°F)	7.1 (44.8)	10.4 (50.7)	15.1 (59.2)	20.7 (69.3)	24.1 (75.4)	26.0 (78.8)	28.8 (83.8)	28.9 (84.0)	25.4 (77.7)	19.4 (66.9)	15.1 (59.2)	9.2 (48.6)	19.2 (66.5)
Daily mean °C (°F)	4.1 (39.4)	6.5 (43.7)	10.6 (51.1)	15.7 (60.3)	19.2 (66.6)	21.7 (71.1)	24.1 (75.4)	23.6 (74.5)	20.4 (68.7)	15.5 (59.9)	11.1 (52.0)	5.9 (42.6)	14.9 (58.8)
Mean daily minimum °C (°F)	2.1 (35.8)	4.1 (39.4)	7.7 (45.9)	12.4 (54.3)	15.7 (60.3)	18.7 (65.7)	20.8 (69.4)	20.1 (68.2)	17.0 (62.6)	12.9 (55.2)	8.5 (47.3)	3.6 (38.5)	12.0 (53.5)
Record low °C (°F)	−5.0 (23.0)	−5.1 (22.8)	−3.7 (25.3)	2.2 (36.0)	7.2 (45.0)	11.8 (53.2)	11.7 (53.1)	13.0 (55.4)	7.9 (46.2)	2.6 (36.7)	−3.0 (26.6)	−4.9 (23.2)	−5.1 (22.8)
Average precipitation mm (inches)	29.2 (1.15)	24.1 (0.95)	43.1 (1.70)	83.1 (3.27)	156.4 (6.16)	197.5 (7.78)	200.3 (7.89)	117.2 (4.61)	96.2 (3.79)	108.8 (4.28)	40.2 (1.58)	25.2 (0.99)	1,121.3 (44.15)
Average precipitation days (≥ 0.1 mm)	16.7	14.3	16.1	16.4	17.7	17.1	13.2	12.9	11.9	16.9	12.8	14.3	180.3
Average snowy days	5.1	2.5	0.5	0	0	0	0	0	0	0	0.1	1.9	10.1
Average relative humidity (%)	86	83	82	79	79	83	78	78	80	85	84	84	82
Mean monthly sunshine hours	29.8	44.8	67.2	93.0	103.7	87.8	150.1	162.2	114.2	66.0	65.3	43.5	1,027.6
Percentage possible sunshine	9	14	18	24	25	21	36	40	31	19	20	13	23
Source: China Meteorological Administration
