= Baigongguan and Zhazidong =

Chinese concentration camps

Baigongguan (Chinese: 白公馆) and Zhazidong (Chinese: 渣滓洞) were Chinese concentration camps that opened in 1943 and were used by the Kuomintang (KMT) and the Sino-American Cooperative Organization (SACO) to gather intelligence about the Empire of Japan during the Second Sino-Japanese War. The camps were located in southwest China, in the Gele Mountains of Chongqing. In 1947, the camps were reopened by the Kuomintang to hold captured communist politicians of the Republic of China. After the People's Liberation Army started its advance on the area and threatened the liberation of the camps, General Dai Li of the Kuomintang authorized the camps to serve as the execution sites of the communist politicians in 1949.

The camps were never officially closed after the liberation of their prisoners. Instead, they were later developed into museums that further honored their victims, who were considered martyrs of communism.

== Background ==
=== Sino-American Cooperation Organization (SACO) ===
The China and United States signed a SACO treaty which created the Sino-American Cooperation Organization (SACO) during World War II. The treaty established an intelligence-gathering entity that was mutual in China, especially among countries that were opposed to Japan. SACO was in a joint operation in China with the Office of Strategic Services (OSS), the Intelligence Agency of America and the CIA. Until this came into effect, it served as a joint training program between the United States of America and China. Dai Li was the chief of operation of this organization, head of the Bureau of Investigations and Statistics and Head of the Secret Police for Chiang Kai-shek. General Dai was a fierce anti-communist. He was also in charge of command for the Loyal Patriotic Army (LPA), a large Japanese military force that had occupied China's interior region. Milton E. "Mary" Miles was the commander of American forces, as well as a Navy Captain. Mary Miles became a Vice Admiral later; he was the commander of Naval Group China (NGC). This was the intelligence unit of the American Navy in China during the period of war.

SACO began setting up camps in 1943. These camps were later referred to as units during the establishment of the Naval Group China. These were units for training guerrillas of China in small arms, sabotage, demolition, radio handling, and combat techniques, aerology, and ship and aircraft recognition. Most of the American instructors or many of the American instructors had law enforcement backgrounds before the war. To a degree, some of the recruits provided by China were not healthy but their willingness and their ability of learning surprised instructors.

A total of about 2,500 marines and sailors trained and operated with guerrilla forces of China, often behind enemy lines. Of all missions during war period that was set up by the Americans in China, the policy of Total Immersion was only applied by SACO with the Chinese. The route from China to Burma was operated by the Rice Paddy Navy, or the "Hell Gang". The mission of this group was to advise, train, and scout areas to land for General Claire Chennault's 14th AF and USN fleet and forecast the weather. They were also mandated to rescue downed American flyers and intercept Japanese radio traffic. The main objective of the mission during the final year of the Second World War was developing and preparing China's coast for allied occupation and penetration. The Fujian Province, commonly known as Foochow was a potential area for staging as well as a potential area for a springboard for the future invasion of Japan.

The trained guerrillas with the help of SACO and Naval Group China had in total destroyed 84 locomotives, at least 200 bridges and 141 ships and river craft. These activities resulted in deaths of Japanese military personnel that totaled to about 71,000; guerillas alone killed an approximate of 30,000. This means that every weapon that guerillas were supplied with by the SACO killed 2.5 Japanese. During the war this kill ratio could not be matched by any American military branch. The estimate of Japanese deaths for CAPT Miles deputy was a less generous 23,000.

In 1946, SACO was officially dissolved after the war ended and the Naval Group of China had departed. However, some loyal guerrillas that were SACO-trained who were part of KMT carried on with aggression against the CCP; this happened when there was a civil war between 1946 and 1949. The Communists took over and after many years, SACO was linked with revolution atrocities and imperial foreign aggression; the US was suspected to have been involved. The incidents of torture and massacre were memorialized by the Chinese government during which US involvement was mentioned.

== Baigongguan ==
Of the two concentration camps, Baigongguan served as the KMT's base of operations. It was designed to hold a hundred prisoners; despite prisoners being killed on a regular basis, the camp was chronically overcrowded. On November 28, 1949, orders were sent to execute all prisoners in ground level cells.

== Zhazidong ==
Prior to serving as a concentration camp, Zhazidong was used as a coal mine. Converted to a prison, Zhazidong held over three hundred prisoners; sixteen barracks for men and two barracks for women. Zhazidong had rooms for guides and officers who were mandated to execute different assignments assigned to them.

The camp had torture chambers for prisoners. Communist politicians were tortured there. There was an interrogation room which held instruments of torture. During the November executions, prisoners were misled into thinking that they were being transported out of the prison. When the cell doors were opened, the occupants were shot by guards with machine guns. Surviving prisoners were then shot in the head. Around 15 prisoners managed to escape through a section of wall to cross a courtyard. Jiang Zhuyun was among the few to escape the prison. She was portrayed in the opera Sister Jiang.

The November 28, 1949 incident saw most communists slaughtered. However, there were those who managed to escape these killings, about 15 of the prisoners.

== Dai Li's control ==
General Dai Li was the commander in charge of the camps. Dai used internal problems within the KMT to justify his actions to the public. With the help of the United States Dai Li was able to gain knowledge on interrogation tactics from the FBI. He then incorporated these tactics into the camps with the aid of supplies the United States had left after the end of World War II in 1945. Dai also acquired two thousand agents.

== Depictions in art and literature ==
Luo Guangbin, Lui Debin, and Yang Yiyan, survivors of Baigongguan and Zhazidong, wrote a novel based on their experiences, which went on to become popular among the Chinese. Published in 1961, the Red Crag discussed party consolidation, party rectification, higher education, and fighting capacity.
