= Klaus Mühlhahn =

German historian and sinologist (born 1963)

Klaus Mühlhahn (born August 19, 1963) is a German historian and sinologist who was a Professor and Vice President of the Free University of Berlin. From 2020 until 2025 he served as president of Zeppelin University. He was awarded the John K. Fairbank Prize in 2009 for his book Criminal Justice in China: A History.

== Biography ==
In 1993 Mühlhahn received a Master's degree in Sinology from the Free University of Berlin, where he also worked as research assistant from 1993 to 2002 in the Department of Sinology. In 1998 he received his Ph.D. in Sinology at the FU Berlin with his dissertation "Herrschaft und Widerstand in der 'Musterkolonie' Kiautschou". From 2002 to 2004 he was visiting fellow at the Center for Chinese Studies, at University of California, Berkeley. From 2004 to 2007 he was Professor of Contemporary Chinese and Asian History at the Institute for History of the University of Turku. In 2007-2010 he was Professor of History and Associate Professor of East Asian Languages and Cultures at the Indiana University in Bloomington. Since 2010 he has been Professor of Chinese History and Culture at the FU Berlin and since 2014 vice president.

In 2009 Mühlhahn was awarded the John K. Fairbank Prize of the American Historical Association for his book Criminal Justice in China: A History.

== Publications ==
- Making China Modern. From the Great Qing to Xi Jinping. Cambridge, Mass.: The Belknap Press of Harvard University Press, 2019.
- Die Volksrepublik China. Berlin/ Boston: De Gruyter, 2017.
- (Ed.): The Cultural Legacy of German Colonial Rule. Berlin/ Boston: De Gruyter, 2015.
- with Wen-hsin Yeh, Hajo Frölich (Ed.): Rethinking Business History in Modern China. Berkeley/ Seoul 2015 (= Cross-Currents e-journal, 16).
- with Nina Berman und Patrice Nganang (Ed.): German Colonialism Revisited: African, Asian, and Oceanic Experiences. Ann Arbor: University of Michigan Press, 2014.
- with Nathalie van Looy (Ed.): The Globalization of Confucius and Confucianism, Münster / London: Lit, 2012 (= Berliner China-Hefte – Chinese History and Society, 41).
- with Clemens von Haselberg (Ed.): Chinese Identities on Screen. Münster/ London: Lit, 2012 (= Berliner China-Hefte – Chinese History and Society, 40).
- Criminal Justice in China – A History. Cambridge: Harvard University Press, 2009.
