= Che Yaoxian =

Chinese army officer and communist

Che Yaoxian (Chinese: 车耀先; pinyin: Chē Yàoxiān; 1894–1946) was a member of the Chinese Communist Party and an officer in the Sichuan army. In 1921, after meeting a local preacher in Jianyang, he converted to Christianity. In 1927, he represented Sichuan at the East Asian Christian Association conference in Shanghai. Sometime in the 1930s, he founded the anti-imperialist Chengdu Christian Improvement Association, which advocated for "self-nourishing" and "self-propagation". However, he also experienced crises of faith, such as in 1928, when he lamented in a poem titled "Oath to Myself": "Religion merely deceives foolish people."
