= Sino-American Cooperative Organization =

World War II intelligence organisation

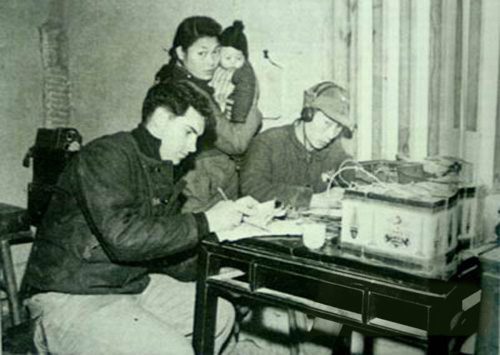
- US intelligence officer teaching Chinese personnel how to use a radio.
- Traditional Chinese: 中美特種技術合作所
- Simplified Chinese: 中美特种技术合作所
Transcriptions
Standard Mandarin
- Hanyu Pinyin: Zhōng měi tèzhǒng jìshù hézuò suǒ

The Sino-American Special Technical Cooperative Organization, also known as the Sino-American Cooperative Organization (SACO), was an intelligence gathering organization created by China and the United States during the Second World War. It was formed by the 1942 SACO Treaty and worked against Japan. It operated in China jointly with the Office of Strategic Services (OSS), the first US intelligence agency and forerunner of the CIA, while also serving as joint training program between the two nations. SACO units set up weather communications, aircraft monitoring, and intelligence stations from southern borders in Indo-China to the northern reaches of the Gobi Desert. They also monitored the activity along the China coast behind enemy lines.

== History and operations ==
The first and last operational chief of the organization was Dai Li (Tai Li, Dai/Tai is the surname), head of Chiang Kai-shek's secret police, the Bureau of Investigation and Statistics. A fierce anti-communist and shadowy man of mystery, General Dai also commanded the Loyal Patriotic Army (LPA), a large militia force active in Japanese-occupied interior regions of China. Commander for the American forces was United States Navy Captain Milton E. Miles. "Mary" Miles, later a Vice Admiral, was commander of Naval Group China (NGC), the American Navy's intelligence unit in China during the war.

In April 1943, SACO began setting up camps (later known as units when Naval Group China was established) to train Chinese guerrillas in small arms, demolition, sabotage, combat techniques, radio handling, aircraft and ship recognition, and aerology. Many, if not most, of the American instructors had backgrounds in law enforcement prior to the war. While some of the recruits the Chinese provided were unhealthy to some degree, they surprised their instructors with their willingness and ability to learn.

About 2500 sailors and Marines trained and operated with Chinese guerrilla forces, often behind Japanese lines. Among all the wartime missions that Americans set up in China, SACO was the only one that adopted a policy of "total immersion" with the Chinese. The "Rice Paddy Navy" or "What-the-Hell Gang" operated in the China-Burma-India theatre, advising and training, forecasting weather and scouting landing areas for USN fleet and General Claire Lee Chennault's 14th AF, rescuing downed American flyers, and intercepting Japanese radio traffic. An underlying mission objective during the last year of war was the development and preparation of the China coast for Allied penetration and occupation.

In total, the guerrillas trained and supported by SACO/Naval Group China had destroyed more than 200 bridges, 84 locomotives, and 141 ships and river craft. Their activities were responsible for the deaths of around 71,000 Japanese military personnel, and the guerrillas themselves killed about 30,000- a rate of 2 1/2 Japanese for each weapon supplied to the guerrillas by SACO. This "kill ratio" was unmatched by any branch of the American military during the war. CAPT Miles deputy's estimate of Japanese deaths was a less generous 23,000.

According to Lance Zedric and Michael Dilley, official report of over 25,000 Japanese soldiers killed by the SACO-trained guerrillas was inflated and unreliable. U.S. instructors were generally barred from participating in missions by Chinese guerrilla commanders and were able to observe only 80 of the likely inflated number of 1,000 battles that the Chinese guerrillas reportedly engaged in. As such, Chinese commanders were free to greatly exaggerate or even outright lie about battle results to enhance their status without outside scrutiny. In reality, the harassing attacks from the guerrillas had little effect on the Japanese Army. What made SACO important was not the training of Chinese guerrillas but the crucial meteorological data it provided for the U.S. Flying Tigers and other Allied units which likely saved thousands of lives.

The official SACO organization dissolved in 1946 after the close of the war, with the subsequent departure of the Naval Group China. However some KMT loyal SACO-trained guerillas continued aggression against the CCP during the civil war (1946–1949). SACO arrested, tortured, and killed political dissidents. For a long period after the Communist victory in the Chinese Civil War, SACO became associated with imperial foreign aggression and atrocities of the revolution were attributed to sinister US involvement. The Chinese government memorialized incidents of torture and massacre at Chongqing former SACO headquarters at Happy Valley, and displayed the "Gele Mountain Revolution Memorial Museum" in Geleshan, citing American supplied handcuffs and weapons in the exhibition as evidence of American involvement. The coalition was blamed for atrocities committed years after dissolution, with no acknowledgement of SACO's participation in the war against Japan. Only recently has the government taken a position to "restore history's original face."

The 1953 movie Destination Gobi is a highly fictionalized account of one group of weather observers. SACO is specifically mentioned as their parent organization.

== See also ==
- Sino-American Mutual Defense Treaty, during Cold War
- United States Taiwan Defense Command
- Military Assistance Advisory Group ROC

== References and further reading ==
- Yu, Shen (1996), "SACO in History and Histories: Politics and Memory", Journal of American-East Asian Relations, 5 (1): 37–76
- Wakeman, Frederic E. (2003). Spymaster : Dai Li and the Chinese Secret Service. Berkeley: University of California Press. ISBN 0520234073.
