= Political Education in the People's Republic of China =

Political education in the People's Republic of China refers to a variety of education methods, some of them coercive or involuntary, whose aim is to have the citizens identify with and support the Chinese Communist Party's policies. The process involves defining political issues, educating people in the policies of the Party, and convincing them of the necessity of a particular political action.

The intensity of political education has varied depending on the political climate and the target of the education. The most intrusive and thorough is “thought reform,” variously referred to as "reeducation" or "transformation." Thought reform often takes place in a tightly controlled environment such as a prison or labor camp, and may involve threats or other coercive measures to convince the target to reshape his or her ideological or political identity. The least intrusive, yet most ubiquitous form of political education is propaganda, which may be conveyed via the media, in political meetings, or through a school curriculum.

== See also ==
- Propaganda in the People's Republic of China
- Thought reform in the People's Republic of China
- Censorship in the People's Republic of China
