= Thought reform in China =

1951–52 ideological campaign of the Chinese Communist Party

Thought reform in the People's Republic of China (Chinese: 思想改造; pinyin: sīxiǎng gǎizào), also known as ideological remolding or ideological reform, was a campaign of the Chinese Communist Party (CCP) to inculcate its citizens into accepting Marxism–Leninism and Mao Zedong Thought from 1951 to 1952. Techniques employed included indoctrination, "struggle sessions", propaganda, criticism and self-criticism, and a variety of other techniques.

== Terminology ==
The Chinese term sīxiǎng gǎizào (思想改造, lit. "thought reform") "ideological remolding" compounds the words sīxiǎng (思想) "thought; thinking; idea; ideology" and gǎizào 改造 "transform; reform; remold; remake; correct".

The related term sīxiǎng gōngzuò (思想工作, lit. "thought work"; also translated as thought-work or thoughtwork) "ideological education", with gōngzuò (工作) "work; job". In modern CCP usage, sīxiǎng gōngzuò "thought work" is a more inconspicuous term for sīxiǎng gǎizào "thought reform".

== History ==
The Thought Reform Movement first began in September 1951, following a speech by premier Zhou Enlai calling for intellectuals to reform their thought. The People's Daily called for teachers and college staff to "arm oneself with the thought of Marxism–Leninism" and to "throw away the vulgar perspectives of individualism and liberalism, and the cultural thought of European-American reactionary bourgeoisie".

Intellectuals who studied overseas were forced to confess to their role as "implementers of the imperialist cultural invasion", while writers across the country were ordered to study Mao's lectures in the "Talk at Yan'an Forum on Literature and Art" and engage in self-criticism. During the movement, many school curricula were restructured, with science and engineering adapting the Soviet models, while courses seen as "pseudo-bourgeois", such as sociology, political science, and economics, were abolished.

=== Three-anti and Five-anti Campaigns ===
The Thought Reform Movement ended by 1952 and merged with the Three-anti/five-anti campaigns of 1951–1952. As a result, the CCP's Central Propaganda Department took ideological control of China's cultural and education systems.

According to Robert Jay Lifton, the CCP's program of thought reform emerged as one of the most powerful efforts at propaganda ever undertaken, and included imposed doctrines, ideological purges, and mass-conversion movements carried out in an organized and comprehensive way. The thought-reform program applied in universities, schools, special "revolutionary colleges", prisons, businesses, government offices, and peasant organisations. It brought significant personal upheaval to the individuals affected.

== "New Socialist Man" ==
According to a 1969 thesis by Theodore Chen, an important concept in thought reform is that of the "New Socialist Man", based on the idea that communist revolution is predicated on "new men with new minds, new ideas, new emotions, and new attitudes". Thus, before the new way of life can prevail, the old must be abolished. In China both the old and new generations were to be remolded according to communist ideology, so the making and remaking of "new men" became a fundamental task of the communist revolution and the main aim of education.

Chen reports that the CCP selected "model citizens" from various walks of life, including laborers, peasants, women, and youth to popularize the attributes of the concept. From the virtues put forth in indoctrination and propaganda, and from the various "models" selected to promote desired behaviors, Theodore Chen writes that it is possible to discern a few major characteristics of the model man envisioned by communist planners. These include: absolute selflessness; obedience to the Communist Party; class consciousness; ideological study; participation in labor and production; versatility; and being a "red expert".

The Chinese notion of the "new man" was significantly influenced by its Soviet predecessor. In psychology, it was linked to Ivan Pavlov's theory of higher nervous activity and the method of conditioning, which were taken up by Chinese revolutionaries to promise the possibility of the "new man" to be created.

== Thought reform of intellectuals ==
The thought reform project on Chinese intellectuals is indicative of the nationwide program, according to Lifton. The most intensive of the thought reform programs for intellectuals were conducted in "revolutionary colleges", set up all over China immediately after the communist revolution. They were most active between 1948 and 1952, when they represented an ideological hard core for the entire thought reform movement, and an extreme model for reform efforts throughout the population.

== See also ==
- Cultural Revolution
- Engineers of the human soul, Stalinist concept
