= Cultural policy of China =

Arts and literature policy of the PRC

Cultural policy in the People's Republic of China (PRC) since the beginning of Xi Jinping's administration in 2012 has largely continued the trend since reform and opening up that the state will "manage culture" but no longer "run culture". State bodies that set cultural policies or regulations include the Publicity Department of the Chinese Communist Party, the National Radio and Television Administration, among other bodies. Cultural policy milestones during Xi's administration include the 2014 Beijing Forum on Literature and Art and the formulation of Xi Jinping Thought on Culture.

During the Mao Zedong era, the ideological basis of the PRC's cultural policy was the Yan'an Forum. These 1942 speeches emphasized that art should translate the concepts of the Chinese Communist Revolution for rural peasants. In this view, revolutionary art should portray the lives of the peasants, who should be the principal audience for it. Ranges of artistic style and criticisms increased during the Hundred Flowers Movement. During the Cultural Revolution, cultural policy institutions were greatly disrupted.

In the era of reform and opening up begun by Deng Xiaoping, many artists and art works that had been criticized during the Cultural Revolution were politically rehabilitated, and cultural policy institutions were restored to normal operation. The state also reduced its financial support for funding culture as part of the principle that the state would "manage culture" but no longer "run culture". Subsequent administrations have generally continued the policy approach of "managing" but not "running" culture.

== Background ==
As academic Richard Curt Kraus observes, "China's arts have long existed in greater intimacy with the state than is typical in the West. Imperial grandeur and Maoist revolution both presumed that art would serve the state".

== Mao Zedong era ==
During the Second-Sino Japanese War, the Communist Party sought to refashion popular culture into a "people's culture" that would refocus culture on the experiences of rural China, reflect socialist principles, and portray the Communist border regions as the future of China.

At the Yan'an Forum in 1942, Mao Zedong described the ideological basis of the Communist Party's approach to the arts. The core concept of the Yan'an Talks was that art should translate the ideas of the Chinese Communist Revolution for rural peasants. This was an effort to reconfigure the social relationship in China between those who worked with their hands and those who wrote. In this view, cultural workers and the masses would both serve as teacher and student for each other. This revolutionary style of art would portray the lives of peasants and be directed towards them as an audience. This approach rejected the idea of art for its own sake; rather, art should serve the needs of the masses.

The revolution promoted amateur arts programs. These expanded rapidly after the founding of the PRC.

During the Mao era of the PRC, production of cultural work in China was state-funded. Following the 1949 establishment of the People's Republic of China, the Chinese Communist Party (CCP) began re-organizing arts institutions through a series of partially coordinated economic and administrative policies. These measures had the effect of (1) making the state the major patron of the arts in China, (2) developing cultural bureaucracies which sometimes competed for authority over arts policies, and (3) diminishing the commercialized pop culture of urban areas. Early PRC cultural policy was influenced by the state's broader approach to "Soviet learning," through which it sought to use the Soviet experience in culture, science, government, and economy as its model.

In November 1949, the Ministry of Culture of the People's Republic of China issued a directive criticizing traditional nianhua for expressing feudal values. The Ministry called for the production of nianhua with revolutionary themes like the "great victory of the people's war of liberation" or "the life and struggles of ordinary labouring people."

In the early 1950s, the CCP prioritized controlling the relatively small cultural market, believing that commercialization of culture would lead to decadent values and weaken opposition to imperialism. Nude works were discouraged, particularly as they offended peasants who had become represented in leadership after the revolution.

In the early 1950s, cultural policy sought to revise the practices of Peking opera. Mao Dun, the Minister of Culture, described the purpose of these policies as "to preserve and develop the positive traditions of old opera and eliminate the unreasonable and unrealistic aspects created by the prolonged effects of feudal society". In 1951, the State Council issued instructions on opera reform. Between 1951 and 1952, the Ministry of Culture banned 26 operas (mostly Peking operas and primarily banning operas in the genre of ghost opera). In 1957, the Ministry of Culture lifted its ban on 24 of those operas, citing its lack of clear guidance, while maintaining the bans on two more because of their scenes of killing and torture.

During the third stage of agricultural collectivization, literary journals urged writers and artists to go into the countryside to see and report on the "high tide" of collectivization.

The Hundred Flowers campaign was a period of relaxation in PRC ideological and cultural policy.

A theme throughout the Mao era was facilitating the creation of "mass art" (also referred to as "worker-peasant-soldier art," or "amateur art practice", among other terms) by amateur artists who were organized at the grassroots level. Mass art could be produced individually or collectively and in a variety of media. Its central focus was depicting workers engaged in agricultural or industrial work. Mass art was particularly emphasized during the Great Leap Forward.

Mao announced the New Folksong Movement at the March 1958 Chengdu Conference, describing folk song writing as a form of mass-led literature that would "sprout" communist art by drawing inspiration from rural tradition. Among the major works produced by the movement, and among the major artworks of the Great Leap Forward overall, was Red Flag Ballads, a volume of 300 poems by anonymous artists edited by Guo Moruo and Zhou Yang.

The Great Leap Forward included promotion of short form "communist arts and literature," a phrase which in this context emphasized cultural works that could be used or shared outside of traditional venues and formats. These included short dramas that could be performed on the streets or "short short stories" of minimal length.

The Great Leap Forward slogan of both red and expert was increasingly applied to the arts in the early 1960s. In the cultural context, this slogan criticized the idea of "artistic genius" as a bourgeois trick to deny the artistic abilities of ordinary people.

In 1963, the Ministry of Culture banned ghost operas. It allowed for exceptions, stating that operas based on legend and myth should not be banned, and that the decision to ban plays outright or revise them to remove ghost scenes should be made at the local and provincial levels in consultation between local cultural bureaus and performers.

Mao died in September 1976. After the Smashing of the Gang of Four, Hua Guofeng and his allies were the short-term political victors. In the cultural area, Hua's policy was largely centered on obtaining control of the mass media from his political opponents.

== After Reform and Opening Up ==
Deng Xiaoping restored cultural officials and arts establishments which had been disrupted by the Cultural Revolution. This included an early wave of political rehabilitation of cultural figures and artworks that had been criticized during the Cultural Revolution.

Through the political discourse of socialist spiritual civilization, the Communist Party signaled to artists that cultural work can help restrain the negative social influences of markets.

In the 1980s, changes to cultural policy included major themes like: (1) ending the iron rice bowl of permanent employment, (2) reforming the "big pot" of egalitarian pay, (3) professionalizing management, including through introducing a contract system for employment of performers, and (4) decreasing state subsidies, with making the arts economically self-sufficient as one of the expressed goals of cultural policy.

In the 1990s, the state massively reduced its financial support for cultural production. Deng's view was that state cultural organizations should have the goal of becoming self-financing. Since the 1990s, cultural production in China is primarily market-driven, particularly after Deng's 1992 southern tour. The state's perspective since that period has been that it will no longer "run culture" but instead will "manage culture". Particularly in the field of online cultural products, Chinese policymakers appreciate the economic benefits of cultural products and their significance as cultural exports while also being concerned that money-driven cultural production can lead to moral transgressions in the name of profit seeking.

Deng receded from the Mao-era ideological tenet that class struggle remains in a socialist society. In the area of cultural policy, this meant receding from the related idea that intellectual must struggle against their bourgeois educations.

During Jiang Zemin's tenure, cultural policy was relatively unchanged.

In 2011, China enacted its Law on the Protection of Intangible Cultural Heritages.

== Xi Jinping ==
Xi Jinping has intensified efforts for a revival of traditional Chinese culture. He has called traditional culture the "soul" of the nation and the "foundation" of the CCP's culture. He has praised the "splendid Chinese civilization", calling the CCP's governance part of "the uninterrupted development of a civilization for several thousand years" which is "rarely seen among nations in the world".

Academic Michel Hockx writes that "[m]ore than any of his post-Mao predecessors, Xi Jinping has tried to intervene in cultural policy and to set political and moral guidelines for literary production." Xi's speeches to the China Federation of Literary and Art Circles have been more than twice as long as those of his predecessors. Xi advocates for a conservative view of artistic works: they should adhere to traditional ideas of "truth, goodness, and beauty," avoiding provocation and artistic trends like modernism, post-modernism, and the avant-garde.

During the 2014 antiprofanity campaign, online literature portals removed certain content deemed erotic, profane, and vulgar.

In 2015, the State Administration of Press, Publication, Radio, Film, and Television (SAPPRFT) issued its Guiding Opinions Concerning the Healthy Development of Online Literature. The Guiding Opinions stated that online literature portals should "enhance online literation editorial staff management mechanisms; implement appointment qualification systems; establish and improve systems such as the real-name registration of writers, the responsible editor system, the publishing unit undersigning system, etc."

In 2017, SAPPRFT issued the Provisional Methods for Evaluating Social Benefits of Online Literature Publication Service Platforms, which proposed criteria to evaluate the social impact of literature portals in order to "improve the quality of published works, regulate the marker order, optimize the development environment, and guide internet literature publishers ... to constantly produce excellent works that organically integrate ideology, artistry, and readability, to better meet the people's spiritual and cultural needs."

On 2 September 2021, the Publicity Department of the Chinese Communist Party announced that it would work on "comprehensive government" of the entertainment industry. This was a response to excesses in the industry, including violations of law (such as tax evasion) and public scandals (as when a major online talent program had voting based on QR codes in milk caps, and some fans bought bottles solely for the QR codes and wasted the bottled milk). The document stated that celebrity behavior that set a bad example for young people should be reined in, stating the need to curb "lawless and immoral entertainers" and "abnormal aesthetics."

The same date, the National Radio and Television Administration (NRTA) issued a Notice stating that the entertainment industry's culture must be based on "loving the Party, loving the nation" and "upholding moral and artistic standards." The Notice states that radio and television programs should uphold "cultural confidence" and "vigorously carry forward China's outstanding traditional culture, revolutionary culture, and advanced socialist culture." The NRTA also included guidance to prevent fandom behaviors deemed unhealthy:

Radio and television units and online audiovisual platforms must not broadcast talent cultivation programs. They must not broadcast variety shows or reality shows involving the children of celebrities. Voting shows must strictly control the voting set-up. There should be no segments or channels allowing for off-site voting, ranking, or supporting. Strictly forbid voting requiring covert expenses such as purchasing certain products or club memberships. Resist any and all unhealthy 'fandom' behavior.

The NRTA documented expressed the idea of "abnormal aesthetics" more concretely than the CCP Publicity Department did. It stated that abnormal aesthetics included niangpao ("sissy pants", a derogatory term). Cultural products deemed as having "abnormal aesthetics" have included danmei (Boys' Love) works. As of 2026, the popularity of cultural products featuring non-heteronormative masculinities has not declined, although its connection with celebrity culture has decreased.

The 2021 Resolution on the Major Achievements and Historical Experience of the Party over the Past Century addressed cultural matters. It describes socialist culture and national solidarity having increased since Reform and Opening Up, but warns that "misguided ideas have often cropped up, such as money worship, hedonism, ultra-individualism, and historical nihilism".

In June 2026, the NRTA implemented a campaign to against "harmful, lowbrow, and pirated" content in China's duanju (micro-drama) niche. Among other areas, the campaign seeks to eliminate material deemed as harmful to children, wealth-flaunting, overly-sexualized, or which includes copyright infringing material.

=== Beijing Forum on Literature and Art ===
During the October 2014 Forum on the Work of Literature and the Arts in Beijing (wenyi gongzuo zuotanhui 文艺工作座谈会, or commonly, the Beijing Forum on Literature and Art), Xi Jinping delivered a speech on cultural policy and the role of literature and the arts in society. Xi emphasized that literary and artistic workers should create art that helps build moral qualities and socialist core values.

=== Xi Jinping Thought on Culture ===
Xi Jinping Thought on Culture (Chinese: 习近平文化思想) is the current cultural, ideological, and propaganda doctrine of the Chinese Communist Party. It is a part of the larger Xi Jinping Thought, which is derived from the speeches of general secretary of the Chinese Communist Party Xi Jinping. It was established during the National Conference on Publicity, Ideology and Cultural Work, held in October 2023.

== See also ==
- Culture of the People's Republic of China
- Hanfu Movement
