= List of Intangible Cultural Heritage elements in China =

Location of China

The United Nations Educational, Scientific and Cultural Organisation (UNESCO) identifies intangible cultural heritage as the "non-physical traditions and practices that are performed by a people". As part of a country's cultural heritage, they include celebrations, festivals, performances, oral traditions, music, and the making of handicrafts. The "intangible cultural heritage" is defined by the Convention for the Safeguarding of Intangible Cultural Heritage, drafted in 2003 and took effect in 2006. Inscription of new heritage elements on the UNESCO Intangible Cultural Heritage Lists is determined by the Intergovernmental Committee for the Safeguarding of Intangible Cultural Heritage, an organisation established by the convention.

China ratified the convention on 27 July 2013. The spring festival was added on 4 Dec 2024. As of 2025, China has 44 elements on the Intangible Cultural Heritage List, ranking the first in the world.

== Intangible Cultural Heritage of Humanity ==
Reference from the UNESCO official website:

=== Representative List ===
Name	Image	Year	Description
Spring festival, social practices of the Chinese people in celebration of traditional new year		2024	
Traditional Li textile techniques: spinning, dyeing, weaving and embroidering		2024	Li people live in Hainan. "Li Brocade is an expression of the earliest textile techniques and is considered a “living fossil” in Chinese textile history," WIPO described.
Qiang New Year Festival		2024	The Qiang people's new year festival. The Qiang's New Year is the most important festival in the traditional culture of Qiang, symbolizing fortune and happiness. It falls on the first day of the tenth lunar month. Celebrations will be progressed for three to five days. During this ceremony, sacrifices are made to the god of the heavens, the god of the mountains, and the god of the village to show gratitude. After that, villagers will eat, drink and dance.
Traditional design and practices for building Chinese wooden arch bridges		2024	The traditional Chinese wooden arch bridge construction technique uses traditional Chinese woodworking tools and manual methods. The bridges are joined using mortise-and-tenon connections to form an extremely stable arch structure. This construction technique is mainly found in the northeastern part of Fujian Province and the southwestern part of Zhejiang Province.
Traditional tea processing techniques and associated social practices in China		2022	
Taijiquan		2020	
Ong Chun/Wangchuan/Wangkang ceremony, rituals and related practices for maintaining the sustainable connection between man and the ocean		2020	Traditional Chinese martial arts which have various claimed origins. It became famous because of Ip Man. Ip Man left Foshan and moved to Hong Kong in 1957. He established an Ong Chun sport association in 1971, therefore Ong Chun is promoted to the world.
Lum medicinal bathing of Sowa Rigpa, knowledge and practices concerning life, health and illness prevention and treatment among the Tibetan people in China		2018	In Tibetan, "Lum" indicates the traditional knowledge and practices of bathing in natural hot springs, herbal water or steam to adjust the balance of mind and body, to ensure health and treat illnesses.
The Twenty-Four Solar Terms, knowledge in China of time and practices developed through observation of the sun's annual motion		2016	
Chinese Zhusuan, knowledge and practices of mathematical calculation through the abacus		2013	The abacus originated in Babylon. It had introduced from the Middle East to Japan and China. In Mandarin, it is called as suanpan. In suanpan it has 2 and 5 decks.
Chinese shadow puppetry		2011	Also known as "Chinese Shadow Play", its origins can be traced all the way back to the Western Han period, more than 2,000 years ago.
Peking opera		2010	jingxi (Jingju, ching-chü), popular Chinese theatrical form that developed in the mid-19th century.
Acupuncture and moxibustion of traditional Chinese medicine		2010	
Grand song of the Dong ethnic group		2009	Dong is an ethnic group in southwestern China. Dong people do not have a writing system like Hanzi (before 1958; now Latin is used), to write down the history, thus they use songs to remember.
Xi’an wind and percussion ensemble		2009	
Sericulture and silk craftsmanship of China		2009	
Nanyin (南音)		2009	The name is lit. 'music from the south', a musical art form which has its roots in China's imperial courts and later flourished in Fujian's Quanzhou region.
Craftsmanship of Nanjing Yunjin (云锦) brocade		2009	
Traditional handicrafts of making Xuan paper		2009	
Yueju opera (粵劇)		2009	The traditional opera form in Cantonese speaking area. The general consensus of the beginning time is in Song Dynasty.
Gesar epic tradition		2009	The ethnic Tibetan, Mongolian and Tu communities in western and northern China share the story of the ancient hero King Gesar, sent to heaven to vanquish monsters, depose the powerful, and aid the weak while unifying disparate tribes.
Traditional firing technology of Longquan celadon		2009	
Regong arts		2009	Tibetan Buddhism art.
Tibetan opera		2009	Tibetan Opera is called Lhamo or Ace Lhamo in Tibetan language, meaning "Sister Fairy". It employs songs, dances, chants and drama to tell stories, with most of its repertoire deriving from Buddhist teachings and Tibetan history.
Manas		2009	The epic tradition of the Kyrgyz people is preserved in manuscripts of the Manas cycle. These poems, derived from the oral epic, were written in the Kyrgyz language and survive from around the turn of the 20th century.
Mongolian art of singing, Khoomei		2009	Khoomei, also called Hooliin Chor or "throat harmony." Khoomei allows one singer to produce a low drone and one or more whistle‑like overtones simultaneously.
Hua'er		2009	Hua'er, or Shan'ge (lit. 'mountain song'; Chinese: 山歌), is the general term to describe "song art in mountainous part in China (e.g. Guangxi, Guizhou)". These songs often talk about the small topics such as love or working. For example, in Lianshan, sanyuesan — a Zhuang traditional festival — is held in Nongli 3rd day of 3rd month.
Farmers’ dance of China's Korean ethnic group		2009	The dance reflects the life, work and believes of the Korean ethnic group, many of whom settled in northeast China in the 19th century. The farmers' dance originated as a way to honor the earth and seek blessings for a bountiful harvest. In traditional performances, villagers offer food and drink to the God of earth before the music and dancing begin.
Chinese calligraphy		2009	
Art of Chinese seal engraving		2009	
Chinese paper-cut		2009	A paper art usually red. After the use of paper became more widespread and more affordable, Chinese women began to use it to make stencils for embroidery on shoes, caps, and bibs. Nature, animals. or geometric patterns would first be drawn on paper, then glued or sewn on top of objects where embroidery was desired.
Chinese traditional architectural craftsmanship for timber-framed structures		2009	
Dragon Boat festival		2009	In Chinese culture, this festival was celebrated in purpose of Qu Yuan's memorial. After Qu jumped into the river in 5th month (Chinese calendar), the people fed the fishes by using zongzi or eggs et al. to ensure that his body would not be bite by the fishes.
Mazu belief and customs		2009	Mazu is a Chinese sea goddess. People believe that she can protect the ships to avoid accidents.
China engraved block printing technique		2009	
Kun Qu opera		2008	
Guqin and its music		2008	Guqin is a music instrument which has history for over 3000 years. Usually people perform it alone.
Uyghur Muqam of Xinjiang		2008	Muqam lit. 'divertimento' in the modern Uyghur language. It is the popular Uyghur performing arts tradition called which emphasizes ancient songs and dances accompanied by traditional instrumental groups.
Urtiin Duu, traditional folk long song		2008	
Hezhen Yimakan storytelling		2011	According to the State Council of China, "The Intergovernmental Committee for the Safeguarding of the Intangible Cultural Heritage at its 20th regular session decided to transfer China's 'Hezhen Yimakan storytelling' from the List of Intangible Cultural Heritage in Need of Urgent Safeguarding to the Representative List of the Intangible Cultural Heritage of Humanity."

=== List of Intangible Cultural Heritage in Need of Urgent Safeguarding ===
Name	Image	Year	No.	Description
Meshrep (Uyghur: مەشرەپ, romanized: mäxräp)		2010	00304	Meshrep is a part of Uyghur cultural tradition. Uyghur is known for its "lively music and spirited dances".
Watertight-bulkhead technology of Chinese junks		2010	00321	
Wooden movable-type printing of China		2010	00322	

== See also ==
- Intangible cultural heritage of China
- Cultural policy of China
