= HiPiHi =

- Developer(s): HiPiHi Co. Ltd
- Designer(s): HiPiHi Co., Ltd
- Platform(s): Windows
- Release: To be released
- Genre(s): Virtual world
- Mode(s): Multiplayer (online only)

HiPiHi was an online 3D virtual world game founded by Xu Hui and Rao Xuewei in Beijing in the People's Republic of China. It was the first Chinese virtual world game that allowed virtual netizens to freely roam around. Users could explore, trade, communicate and create things in their virtual environment.

== History ==
Founders Xu Hui and Rao Xuewei began exploring the idea in October 2005. HiPiHi was founded in Beijing on April 17, 2006. Investments were made by Institutional Angel GCIG on August 8, 2006. Alpha testing began in December 2006. Beta testing began on March 19, 2007, with approximately 10,000 users. The service appears to have been shut down completely in August 2012.

== Challenges ==
Due to the position of the Chinese government and Beijing's authoritarian policies against Taiwanese independence, Tibetan independence, anti-government criticism and Falun Gong religious groups, this game was expected by some to have major social hurdles. It was uncertain as to how the game would be managed or censored, though founder Xu Hui had a good reputation, including being labeled "Top Ten China Internet Heroes" in 1999 prior to the HiPiHi project.

== See also ==
- Second Life
- Cyworld
- Culture of the People's Republic of China
