= Two Creates =

Chinese Communist Party slogan

The Two Creates (Chinese: 两创) is a political slogan first proposed by Chinese Communist Party (CCP) general secretary Xi Jinping in 2014.

== History ==
The concept was first used by Chinese Communist Party (CCP) general secretary Xi Jinping during a collective study session of the Politburo in February 2014. It was also used by Xi in February 2018 during an event marking the 200th birth anniversary of Karl Marx.

== Content ==
The Two Creates refer to:

1. Creative transformation (创造性转化)
2. Innovative development (创新性发展)

Two Creates is a component of Xi Jinping Thought on Culture. According to the CCP, it is through the Two Creates that traditional Chinese culture can serve as the "soul and root" and realize the Two Integrations in the New Era of Socialism with Chinese Characteristics.

== See also ==
- Xi Jinping Thought on Culture
- Two Integrations
