= Intangible cultural heritage of China =

Cultural elements in People's Republic of China

The People's Republic of China was an early supporter of UNESCO's efforts to enact a convention for safeguarding intangible cultural heritage and signed the convention in 2004. As of 2025, China is the country with the most elements (44) on the UNESCO Intangible Cultural Heritage list. China also has a broader national Law on the Protection of Intangible Cultural Heritages, which it enacted in 2011. As of 2024, there were over 1,557 intangible cultural heritages on the central government's protected list.

== Overview ==
The United Nations Educational, Scientific and Cultural Organisation (UNESCO) identifies intangible cultural heritage as the "non-physical traditions and practices that are performed by a people". As part of a country's cultural heritage, they include celebrations, festivals, performances, oral traditions, music, and the making of handicrafts. The "intangible cultural heritage" is defined by the Convention for the Safeguarding of Intangible Cultural Heritage, drafted in 2003 and took effect in 2006. Inscription of new heritage elements on the UNESCO Intangible Cultural Heritage Lists is determined by the Intergovernmental Committee for the Safeguarding of Intangible Cultural Heritage, an organisation established by the convention.

China's Law on the Protection of Intangible Cultural Heritage includes state support for additional intangible cultural heritages. Each level of government from local to central maintains its own lists of protected cultural heritages. Intangible heritages include folk music, dance, sports and folklore (folklore includes folk religious practices like the worship of Mazu, the Miaofengshan pilgrimage, offerings to the Yellow Emperor, and Qingming Festival). As of 2024, there were 1,557 intangible cultural heritages on the central government's protected list.

== History ==
China was an early supporter of UNESCO's effort to draft a convention on intangible cultural heritage and signed the resulting convention in 2004.

After the early 2000s, many activities formerly deemed by the government as superstitious came to be viewed as part of China's intangible cultural heritage.

In 2011, China enacted its Law on the Protection of Intangible Cultural Heritages.

Xi Jinping's discourse of the China Dream incorporates intangible cultural heritages such as the production of clay figurines in the style of Qing-era craftsman Clayman Zhang.

According to academic Yi Sun publishing in 2024, "China has played an increasingly dynamic role in energizing" the UNESCO Intangible Cultural Heritage Cooperation program.

The spring festival was added to the UNESCO list on 4 Dec 2024. As of 2025, China has 44 elements on the Intangible Cultural Heritage List, ranking first in the world.

== See also ==
- List of Intangible Cultural Heritage elements of China
- Cultural policy of China
- Culture of the People's Republic of China
- Other articles on national or regional intangible cultural heritage:
  - Intangible cultural heritage of Finland
  - Intangible cultural heritage of the Philippines
  - Lists of intangible cultural heritage elements
