= Chinese funeral rituals =

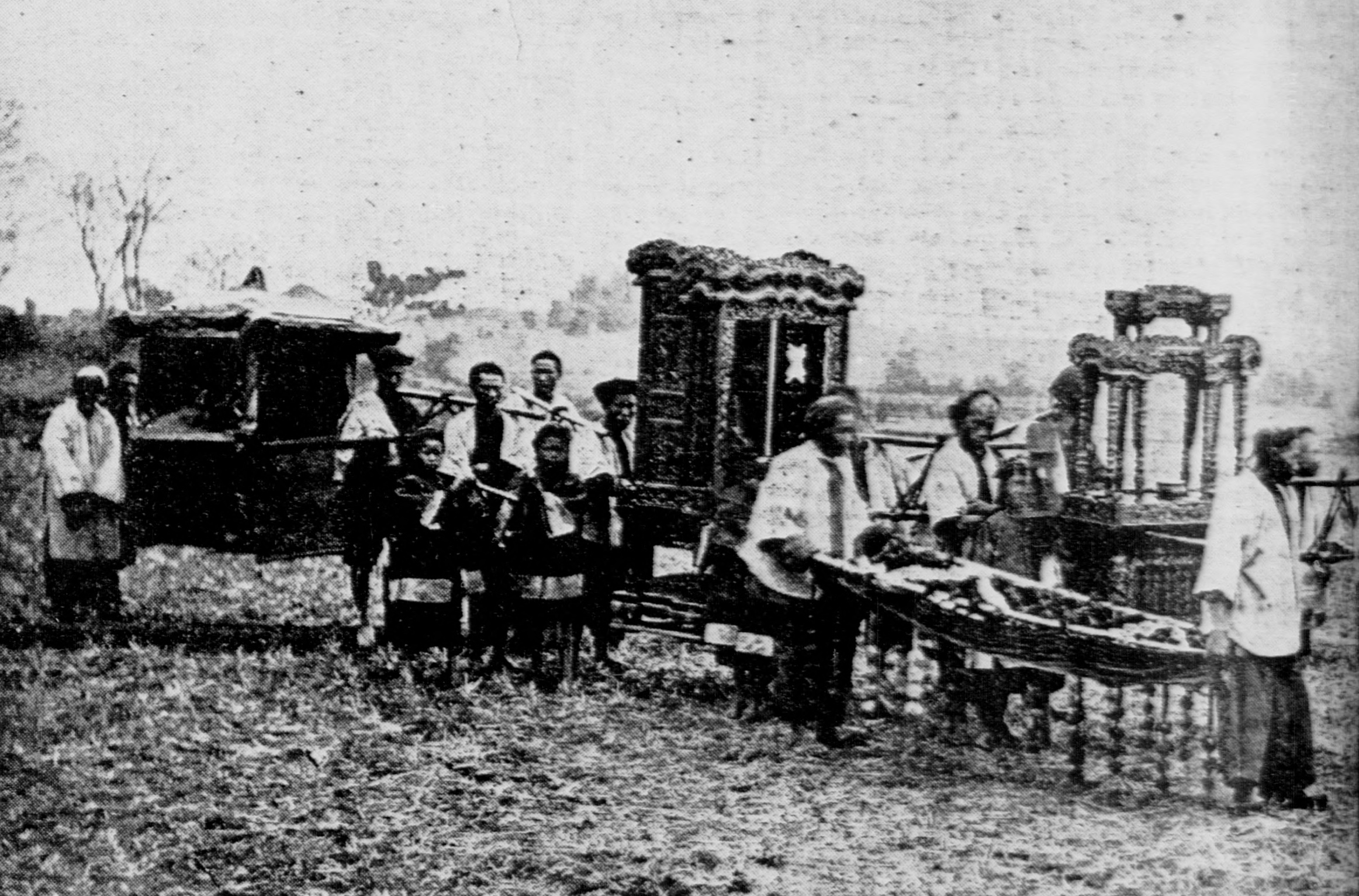
Traditional Chinese funeral march, circa 1900

Chinese funeral rituals comprise a set of traditions broadly associated with Chinese folk religion, with different rites depending on the age of the deceased, the cause of death, and the deceased's marital and social statuses. Different rituals are carried out in different parts of China and many contemporary Chinese people carry out funerals according to various religious faiths such as Buddhism or Christianity. However, in general, the funeral ceremony itself is carried out over seven days, and mourners wear funerary dress according to their relationship to the deceased. Traditionally, white clothing is symbolic of the dead, while red is not usually worn, as it is traditionally the symbolic color of happiness worn at Chinese weddings. The number three is significant, with many customary gestures being carried out three times.

While burial was traditionally favored, in the present day, the dead are often cremated rather than buried, particularly in large cities in China.

== History ==
Throughout history, Chinese people have carried out complex funeral rites and preparations. For example, the late 3rd century BCE Terracotta Army contains approximately 9,000 terracotta figures that were buried to protect Qin Shi Huang, the first Emperor of China.

Traditional burial customs show a strong belief in life after death and the need for ancestor veneration among the living; Confucian philosophy calls for paying respect to one's ancestors as an act of filial piety (孝 xiào). These ideals still inform funeral rites for many Chinese people today.

Cremation was a widespread practice in the Song dynasty. The Ming and Qing dynasties sought to ban cremation on the grounds that it was opposed to Confucian principles (Buddhists, mainly in monasteries, continued cremation practices however).

Beginning in the 17th century, various lay groups belonging to different religions began advocating for less expensive, more austere, burial rights.

During the New Culture Movement, in 1919 Hu Shi advocated that the traditional funeral (which he described as "hypocritical," "savage," and "superstitious") should be replaced with a short mourning period.

In 1928, the Nationalist government of the Republic of China sought to modernize funerary tradition as part of its campaign against superstition. Its measures had little impact on the practices of the masses and mainly impacted the funeral practices for officials and those in the military. The Kuomintang government also promoted the idea of the memorial meeting as a modern alternative to the traditional funeral, but the memorial meeting tended to be used only for high-ranking individuals.

The New Life Movement promoted cremation as a modern, rational, and hygienic practice.

In his 1940 speech Serve the People, Mao Zedong promoted the idea of the memorial meeting:

From now on, when anyone in our ranks who has done some useful work dies, be he a soldier or a cook, we should have a funeral ceremony and a memorial meeting in his honour. This should become the rule. And it should be introduced among the people as well. When someone dies in a village, let a memorial meeting be held. In this way we express our mourning for the dead and unite all the people.

Memorial meetings became more common after the 1949 proclamation of the People's Republic of China. The Chinese Communist Party (CCP) promoted its view of modern funerals as the idea of the "new democratic funeral". At a new democratic funeral, mourners wore ordinary clothes and armbands rather than traditional sackcloth. CCP propaganda urged people to spend more time and money caring for the elderly while they were alive, and less money on their funerals, an idea summed up in the slogan "thick care, thin burial".

In 1956, Mao Zedong declared that deceased people should be cremated instead of being buried to retain the amount of arable land. Since then, much of the urban population have been cremated instead of being buried. In the rural areas, there remained some resistance to the policy. Some hastened their own deaths before the policy was introduced in their locations. Officials faced resistance in their efforts to reclaim land by destroying cemeteries. A 2021 South China Morning Post article cited 12 instances of exhumations by officials of ground-buried bodies without family consent. According to the Chinese Ministry of Civil Affairs (MCA), of the 9.77 million deaths in 2014, 4.46 million, or 45.6%, were cremated.

== Practice ==
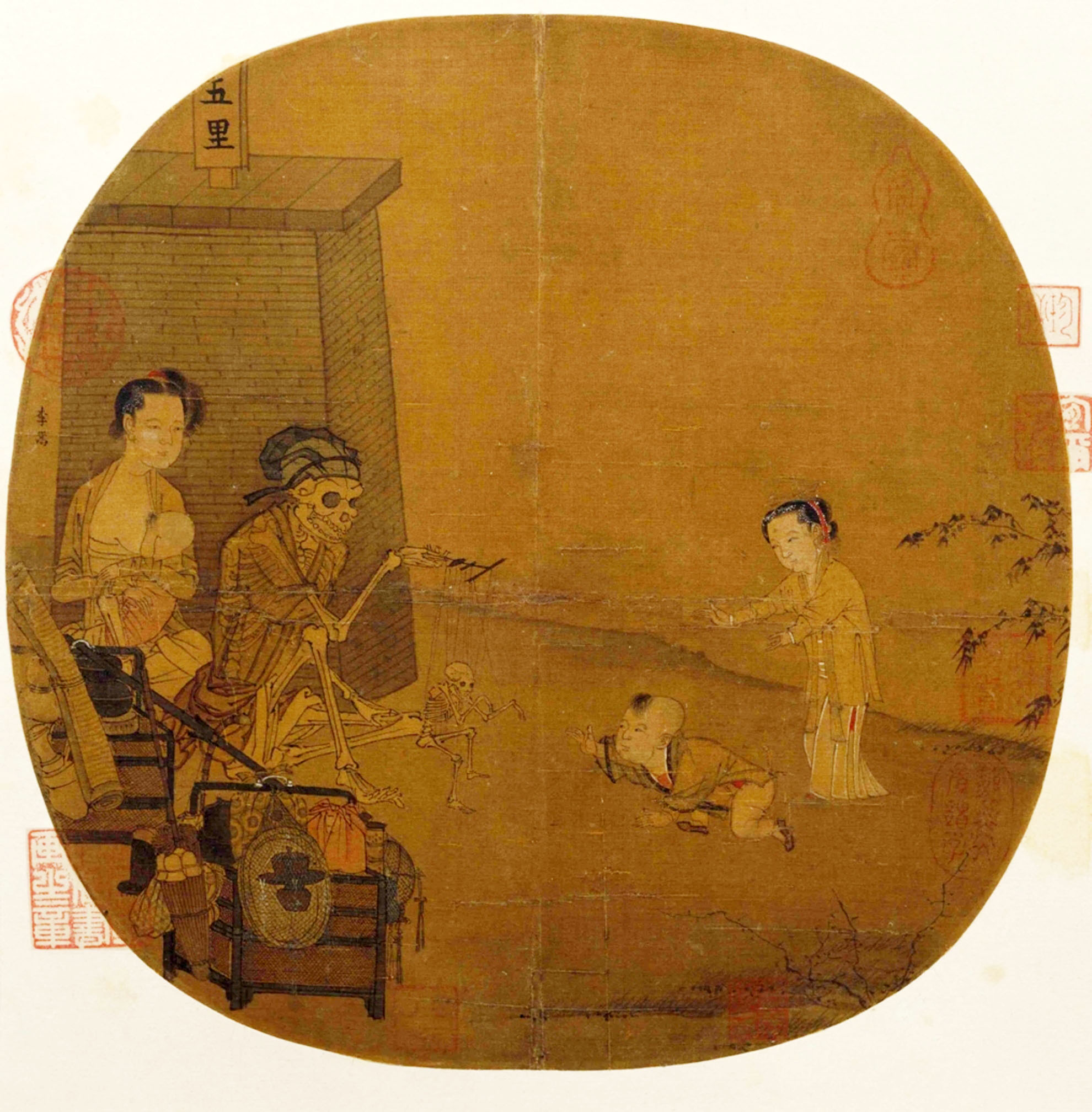
Skeleton Fantasy Show by Li Song (1190–1264)

Traditional funeral rituals included elements such as notifying the community and the Stove God by wailing, wearing mourning clothes, ritual bathing of the corpse, transferring money and goods to the dead, preparing a soul tablet, hiring ritual professionals, and music, among others.

It is customary for relatives to hold vigils over the dying, in order to accompany them until the very last moment before entering the afterlife. This process, called shǒu líng (守靈), is a way for loved ones to show filial piety and loyalty to the deceased. Family members thus take shifts to watch over a relative on their deathbed.

It is common to place a white banner over the door of the household to signify that a death has occurred. Families will usually gather to carry out funeral rituals, in order both to show respect for the dead and to strengthen the bonds of the kin group. Those with closer relationships to the dead (i.e. sons and daughters) wear white garments, while more distant relatives wear garments in different colors of white, black, blue and green. The colors red, yellow, and brown are traditionally not worn during the mourning period, which may last up to three years. Before a funeral, an obituary notice fùwén (訃聞) is commonly sent to relatives and friends announcing the date and time of the funeral procession. The date is usually selected as an auspicious one according to the Chinese fortune calendar (通勝 tōng shèng).

The deceased is dressed in clean funeral dress (小殮 xiǎo liàn) in preparation for their departure from the world (人世 rén shì) and journey into the afterlife (來世 lái shì). Dà liàn (大殮) is the ritual of transferring the body of deceased into the coffin (入木 rù mù), which will rest in the funeral hall decorated with four-character idioms (成语 cheng yu) prior to the burial or cremation. The coffin is said to keep body and soul together in the transition from the living world to the underworld.

Before the funeral procession, the jiā jì (家祭) is held. According to the closeness and status of the family members, they will pay respects diàn (奠) to the deceased.

According to Chinese custom, an elder should never show respect to someone younger. So, if the deceased is a young bachelor, for example, his body cannot be brought home and must remain at the funeral parlour. His parents cannot offer prayers to their son either. Since he was unmarried, he did not have any children who could perform these same rites for him. (This is why the body cannot come into the family home.) If an infant or child dies, no funeral rites are performed either since respect cannot be shown to a younger person. The child is thus buried in silence.

Funeral rites may include an installation of the deceased among their ancestors.

Funerals in rural villages can last for days and include thousands of people and complex rituals.

The funeral procession (發引 fā yǐn) is the process of bringing the hearse to the burial site or site of cremation. During the funeral, offerings of food items, incense, and joss paper are commonly presented. The offering of food and joss paper signifies the continuing interdependence between the deceased and their living descendants. The act of burning the spirit money is said to send it to the supernatural world where it becomes real money. Funerary rituals involving spirit money tend to be more elaborate in south China than in north China.

Taoist or Buddhist prayers are sometimes carried out by monks, to help the deceased's soul to find peace and escape the fate of becoming a restless ghost.

In the Confucian tradition, interment is said to help the deceased achieve final serenity.

Rites for those who have died at sea may include "water road" (shuilu) memorial services. The underlying tradition is that the spirits of those who have died at sea have difficulties because their relatives cannot make offerings to them and therefore they are more likely to become restless ghosts, and these rites may keep them from roaming.

Every year at the Qing Ming Festival (清明節), people pay respect to their ancestors by visiting their graves and tidying up their tombstones. Later generations are invited to participate through this process of ancestor veneration (愼終追遠 shèn zhōng zhuī yuǎn).

== See also ==
- Filial mourning
- Ancestor veneration in China
- Color in Chinese culture
- Chinese burial money
