= Hua Qianfang =

Chinese essayist and blogger (born 1978)

- 花千芳
- Born: Ning Xueming (宁学明); 1978 (age 47–48); Qingyuan Manchu Autonomous County, Liaoning, China
- Occupations: Essayist, blogger
- Writing career
- Language: Chinese
- Genre: Prose
- Notable work: Our Armageddon

Chinese name
- Chinese: 花千芳
Transcriptions
Standard Mandarin
- Hanyu Pinyin: Huā Qiānfāng
- Gwoyeu Romatzyh: Hua Chianfang
- Wade–Giles: Hua Ch'ien-fang

Hua Qianfang (Chinese: 花千芳; pinyin: Huā Qiānfāng; born 1978) is a Chinese essayist and blogger. He is now the vice president of Fushun Writers Association. His most well-known works are Our Armageddon and Our Journey Is The Ocean of Stars. He is a supporter of communist orthodoxy and has expressed nationalist, anti-American and anti-western sentiments. Xi Jinping, General Secretary of the Chinese Communist Party, praised Hua's writing at the 2014 Beijing Forum on Literature and Art for spreading positive energy.

== Biography ==
Hua was born and raised in Qingyuan Manchu Autonomous County, Liaoning.

At the 2014 Beijing Forum on Literature and Art, Xi Jinping praised Hua, along with Zhou Xiaoping, as internet writers who spread positive energy.

On November 21, 2014, Hua Qianfang took part in China's inaugural World Internet Conference, he said: "In its determination to lead the Information Age, China already has the heart of Sima Zhao."

== Works ==
- Our Armageddon (我们的末日)
- Our Journey Is The Ocean of Stars (我们的征途是星辰大海)
