= Wang Fang (singer) =

Chinese female singer

- 王芳
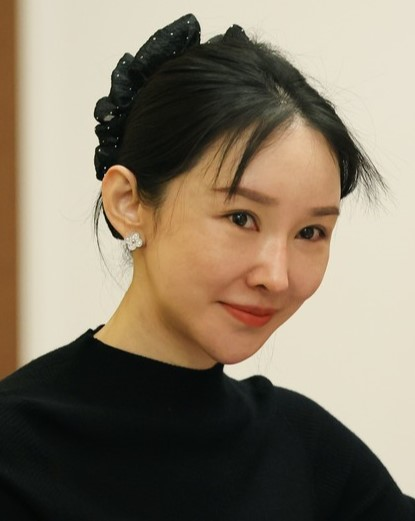
- Wang in 2023
- Born: June 25, 1985 (age 41); Liaoyang, Liaoning, China
- Education: Shenyang Conservatory of Music
- Occupation: Singer
- Years active: 2012–present
- Spouse: Zhou Xiaoping (m. 2017)

Wang Fang (Chinese: 王芳; pinyin: Wáng Fāng; born 25 June 1985) is a Chinese opera singer.

== Early life and education ==
Wang was born on June 25, 1985 in Liaoyang. Her father was an electrician at a vocational technical college while her mother worked at a textile factory in Shenyang. In 2002, she was admitted to the undergraduate class of folk vocal singing at Shenyang Conservatory of Music and graduated in 2006. After graduation, she worked as a vocal teacher at the conservatory before completing her master's degree in folk vocal music at the conservatory in 2013.

== Musical career ==
In 2012, she won the national annual overall runner-up of Jiangxi Satellite TV's China Red Song Club and represented Jiangxi Satellite TV in China Central Television (CCTV)'s Straight to the Spring Festival Gala. In 2013, she participated in CCTV's Fifteenth Youth Song Competition, and won the bronze award while representing Liaoning division and was listed in the national top 10 in national singing. At the end of the same year, she participated onstage in CCTV's Spring Festival Gala and sang the song Hymn to Heroes, which honored the soldiers of the People's Volunteer Army who fought in the Korean War. In 2014, she released her song Beautiful Chinese Dream.

== Controversies ==
On 7 September 2023, Russian media reported that a delegation of Chinese bloggers including Wang visited Russian-occupied Donetsk Oblast. A video emerged of Wang singing the Soviet patriotic song "Katyusha" in Mandarin at the bombed-out Donetsk Academic Regional Drama Theater in Mariupol, where a Russian airstrike on 16 March 2022 killed over 600 Ukrainian civilians sheltering there at time. The delegation also visited the Russia-occupied Autonomous Republic of Crimea where they met with the self-proclaimed head of the republic Sergey Aksyonov, to discuss cultural exchanges and other joint projects. The video of Wang singing in Mariupol was posted on social media site Vkontakte by the Russia-installed head of the so-called Donetsk People's Republic Denis Pushilin attracted attention, resulting in the Ukrainian government demanding an explanation from China on why the delegation was allowed to travel to the occupied territories. Wang's husband Zhou Xiaoping defended her on the Chinese social media platform Weibo stating that the theater was bombed by 'Ukrainian Neo-Nazis' and that "local residents expressed how inspired they were after hearing Wang Fang sing, and some were even moved to tears." As a measure in response to the visit, the Ministry of Foreign Affairs of Ukraine sanctioned Wang and the members of the Chinese delegation, and also banned them from entering Ukraine. Back in China, the video and news articles related to Wang's performance were censored from the Chinese internet.

== Personal life ==
On 25 March 2017, she married online commentator Zhou Xiaoping.

== Discography ==
- "Let's Dance" (让我们舞起来) (2012)
- "Hymm to Heroes" (英雄赞歌) (2013)
- "Beautiful Chinese Dream" (美丽中国梦) (2014)
