= Culture of the People's Republic of China =

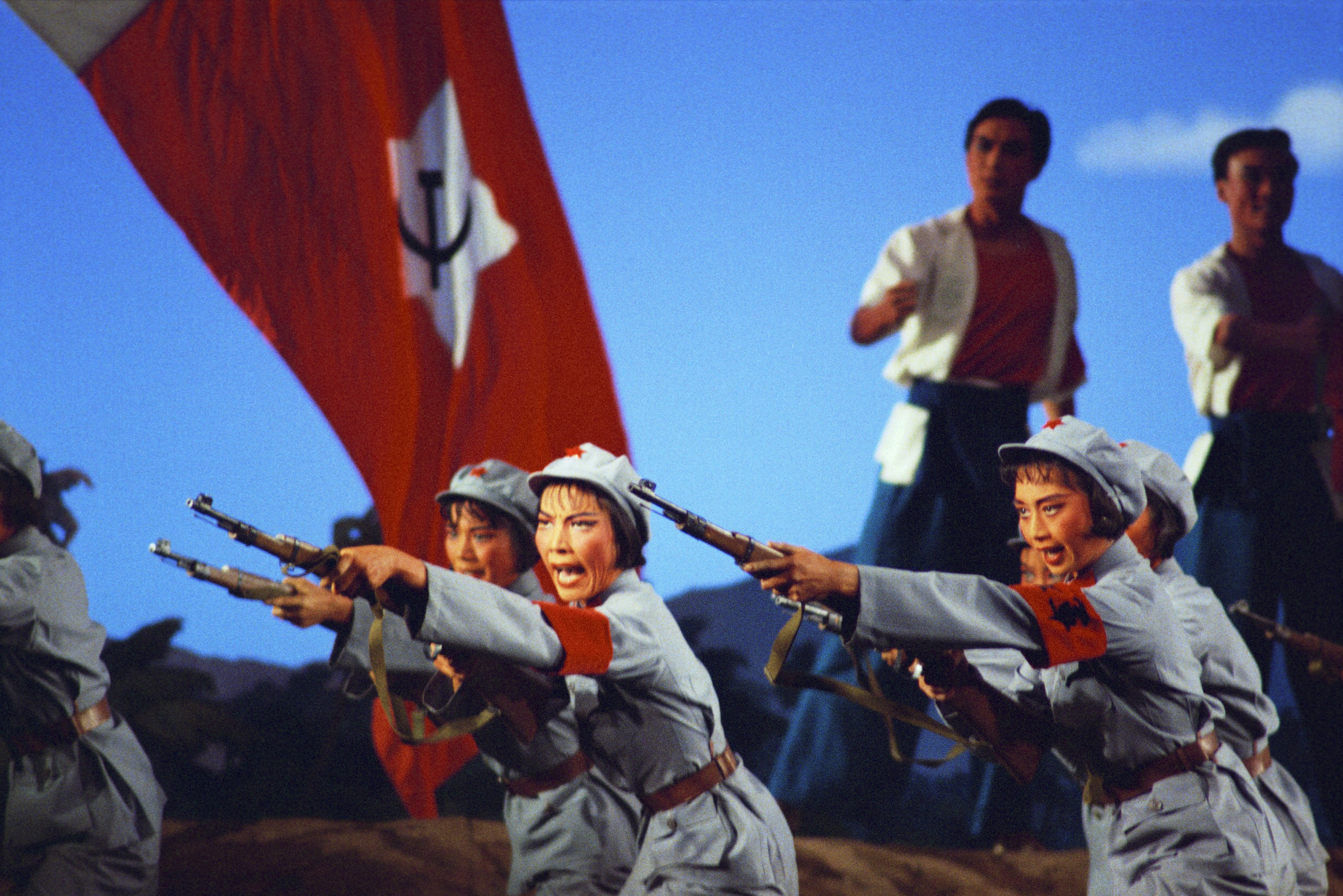
Red Detachment of Women, one of the Eight-model plays with Communist themes

The culture of the People's Republic of China (PRC) is a blend of traditional Chinese culture with communist and other international modern and post-modern influences. During the Cultural Revolution, an enormous number of cultural treasures of inestimable value were seriously damaged or destroyed, and the practice of many arts and crafts was prohibited. Since the early 1980s, however, official repudiation of those policies has been complemented by efforts to renew China's distinct cultural traditions.

The culture of the People's Republic was in development long before its foundation in 1949 and is mainly a combination of traditional Chinese culture and communism. Much of the diversity of China's culture seems to come from the diversity of the Han Chinese who make up China, and the national minorities who bring individual cultural elements from their cultures and contribute to a continuing development of Chinese culture that follows cultural changes nationwide and internationally. The culture is also very much based on the history of China, which has developed, adapted, and assimilated over thousands of years. The ideology of the Communist and Maoist movement beginning in the twentieth century is certainly crucial to understanding modern Chinese culture.

Today, China still has many close cultural links with other parts of the world, especially within East Asia, Southeast Asia, and overseas Chinese communities. Its cultural elements have spread across the globe due to Ancient China's influence, as well as the country's modernizing popular culture and rise as a global power, becoming one of the most prominent cultural forces in the world, and the predominant culture in Asia.

== History ==
=== Early years ===
China's cultural market prior to the founding of the People's Republic of China was too underdeveloped for most artists to support themselves through creating art. During the first half of the 20th century, the arts in China were not well-organized and the social status of most artists was low. Most elite artists found it necessary to engage in teaching, editorial work, or other employment to support themselves economically. The Communist Revolution expanded opportunities for artists to obtain steady employment in their fields.

During the Second-Sino Japanese War, the Communist Party sought to refashion popular culture into a "people's culture" that would refocus culture on the experiences of rural China, reflect socialist principles, and portray the Communist border regions as the future of China.

The revolution promoted amateur arts programs. These expanded rapidly after the founding of the PRC.

After the establishment of the People's Republic of China in 1949, traditional Chinese culture was tolerated to some extent. The main changes concentrated on attempts to remove traditional social inequalities, such as sexism, ethnocentrism, and serfdom. The Standard Chinese dialect was promoted by the Central People's Government in Beijing as the lingua franca, continuing campaigns by the Republican era, but local varieties of Chinese and non-Sinitic languages remain in use.

As the Soviet Union was an ally of the Chinese government at the time, Russian culture and the Russian language were quite popular. This trend was halted in 1961 by the Sino-Soviet split.

=== Cultural Revolution ===
When the Cultural Revolution began in 1966, all forms of traditional culture, Chinese (Eastern) or European (Western), were suppressed, including to bring an end to the Four Olds. Temples and churches were vandalized by the Red Guards; Confucian morality was frowned upon; and a cult of personality surrounding Chairman Mao Zedong was promoted. The Little Red Book achieved a level of sanctity as part of Maoism, which became the national ideology. Simplified characters were also officially introduced at the time, though many such simplified characters have existed for hundreds of years. It was in an effort to promote literacy but has brought a debate on traditional and simplified characters.

The artistic community was particularly affected by the Cultural Revolution. Initially, only eight "Sample Acts", or propaganda performances, were allowed, along with the "Loyalty Dance", posters that deify Chairman Mao, and a large number of revolutionary songs such as The East Is Red.

During the later stages of the Cultural Revolution, the Criticize Lin, Criticize Confucius campaign was a political campaign started by Mao Zedong's fourth wife Jiang Qing, which lasted from 1973 to 1974 and was an extension of the then-current anti-Lin Biao campaign, used to attack the then-Premier Zhou Enlai.

=== Post-Mao era ===
After the Maoist era, there has been a renaissance of traditional Chinese culture. Local religions, including Buddhism, Taoism, and Confucianism, have flourished. These are not mutually exclusive, and many people practice a combination of the three along with elements of various folk religions. There has also been a revival of Islam and Christianity in China, although religious institutions remain under the control of the government. The Three-Self Patriotic Movement (TSPM) and the China Christian Council (CCC) are Protestant groups. The Chinese Patriotic Catholic Association (CCPA) and the Chinese Catholic Bishops' Conference (CCBC) are subordinate to the government in Beijing, instead of to the Holy See.

The television stations in the PRC have in recent years produced numerous quality drama series, covering everything from imperial history to modern-day police actions, and are gaining immense popularity in mainland China.

Beginning in the late 1980s and early 1990s, mainland China became exposed to more western elements, notably pop culture. A trend for nude paintings, which were not historically an element of the Chinese cultural tradition, developed in the late 1980s. American cinema is popular. Young people gather late at night in bars and nightclubs. There is a growing obsession with brand names. Teen slang is incorporating western language. China has also developed a unique cell phone culture, as it has the most mobile phone users in the world, as well as being the country with the most internet users in the world.

== Literature ==
=== Modern prose ===
In the New Culture Movement (1917–23), the literary writing style was largely replaced by the vernacular in all areas of literature. This was brought about mainly by Lu Xun (1881–1936), China's first major stylist in vernacular prose (other than the novel), and the literary reformers Hu Shih (1891–1962) and Chen Duxiu (1880–1942).

The late 1920s and 1930s were years of creativity in Chinese fiction, and literary journals and societies espousing various artistic theories proliferated. Among the major writers of the period were Guo Moruo (1892–1978), a poet, historian, essayist, and critic; Mao Dun (1896–1981), the first of the novelists to emerge from the League of Left-Wing Writers and one whose work reflected the revolutionary struggle and disillusionment of the late 1920s; and Ba Jin (1904–2005), a novelist whose work was influenced by Ivan Turgenev and other Russian writers. In the 1930s, Ba Jin produced a trilogy that depicted the struggle of modern youth against the age-old dominance of the Confucian family system. Comparison often is made between Jia (Family), one of the novels in the trilogy, and Hong Lou Meng. Another writer of the period was the gifted satirist and novelist Lao She (1899–1966). Many of these writers became important as administrators of the artistic and literary policy after 1949. Most of those still alive during the Cultural Revolution were either purged or forced to submit to public humiliation.

The League of Left-Wing Writers was founded in 1930 and included Lu Xun in its leadership. By 1932 it had adopted the Soviet doctrine of socialist realism, that is, the insistence that art must concentrate on contemporary events in a realistic way, exposing the ills of non-socialist society and promoting the glorious future under communism. After 1949 socialist realism, based on Mao's famous 1942 "Yan'an Talks on Literature and Art," became the uniform style of Chinese authors whose works were published. Conflict, however, soon developed between the government and the writers. The ability to satirize and expose the evils in contemporary society that had made writers useful to the Chinese Communist Party (CCP) before its accession to power was no longer welcomed. Even more unwelcome to the party was the persistence among writers of what was deplored as "petty bourgeois idealism," "humanitarianism," and an insistence on freedom to choose the subject matter.

At the time of the Great Leap Forward, the government increased its insistence on the use of socialist realism and combined with it so-called revolutionary realism and revolutionary romanticism. Authors were permitted to write about contemporary China, as well as other times during China's modern period — as long as it was accomplished with the desired socialist revolutionary realism. Nonetheless, the political restrictions discouraged many writers. Although authors were encouraged to write, the production of literature fell off to the point that in 1962 only forty-two novels were published.

During the Cultural Revolution, the repression and intimidation led by Mao's fourth wife, Jiang Qing, succeeded in drying up all cultural activity except a few "model" operas and heroic stories. Although it has since been learned that some writers continued to produce in secret. During that period, no significant literary work was published.

=== Literature in the post-Mao period ===
The arrest of Jiang Qing and the other members of the Gang of Four in 1976, and especially the reforms initiated at the Third Plenum of the Eleventh National Party Congress Central Committee in December 1978, led more and more older writers and some younger writers to take up their pens again. Much of the literature discussed the serious abuses of power that had taken place at both the national and the local levels during the Cultural Revolution. The writers decried the waste of time and talent during that decade and bemoaned abuses that had held China back. At the same time, the writers expressed eagerness to make a contribution to building Chinese society. This literature, often called "the literature of the wounded," contained some disquieting views of the party and the political system. Intensely patriotic, these authors wrote cynically of the political leadership that gave rise to the extreme chaos and disorder of the Cultural Revolution. Some of them extended the blame to the entire generation of leaders and to the political system itself. The political authorities were faced with a serious problem: how could they encourage writers to criticize and discredit the abuses of the Cultural Revolution without allowing that criticism to go beyond what they considered tolerable limits.

During this period, a large number of novels and short stories were published; literary magazines from before the Cultural Revolution were revived, and new ones were added to satisfy the seemingly insatiable appetite of the reading public. There was a special interest in foreign works. Linguists were commissioned to translate recently published foreign literature, often without carefully considering its interest for the Chinese reader. Literary magazines specializing in translations of foreign short stories became very popular, especially among the young.

It is not surprising that such dramatic change brought objections from some leaders in government and literary and art circles, who feared it was happening too fast. The first reaction came in 1980 with calls to combat "bourgeois liberalism," a campaign that was repeated in 1981. These two difficult periods were followed by the campaign against spiritual pollution in late 1983, but by 1986 writers were again enjoying greater creative freedom.

== Sport ==
Sports in the People's Republic of China consists of a variety of competitive sports. Traditional Chinese culture regards physical fitness as an important characteristic. China has its own national quadrennial multi-sport event similar to the Olympic Games called the National Games. In 2018, 21% of people in China called basketball their favorite sport, followed by 17% for association football. In 2022, 22% of people in China said that basketball is their favourite sport, followed by 21% for association football.

Sports in China has long been associated with the martial arts. Before the 1980s, the country's international sports success was mainly in table tennis. This changed with the 1981 FIVB Volleyball Women's World Cup where the Chinese team won the gold medal amid enormous public attention.

Prior to the 1990s, sports were entirely funded by the government. In 1994, Chinese association football was professionalized, followed by basketball, volleyball, ping pong, and weiqi. Professionalization led to commercialization; this meant that sports associations became profit-making entities and that a club system and professional sports leagues were formed. Chinese athletes have also begun joining professional leagues abroad, such as basketball player Yao Ming's entry into the United States' NBA in the 2002 draft.

== Traditional arts ==
China was an early supporter of UNESCO's effort to draft a convention on intangible cultural heritage and signed the resulting convention in 2004. In 2011, China enacted its Law on the Protection of Intangible Cultural Heritages.

=== Drama ===
Traditional drama, often called "Chinese opera," grew out of the zaju (variety plays) of the Yuan dynasty (1279–1368) and continues to exist in 368 different forms, the best known of which is Beijing Opera, which assumed its present form in the mid-nineteenth century and was extremely popular in the Qing dynasty (1644–1911) court. In Beijing Opera, traditional Chinese string instruments and percussion instruments provide a strong rhythmic accompaniment to the acting. The acting is based on allusion: gestures, footwork, and other body movements express such actions as riding a horse, rowing a boat, or opening a door. Spoken dialogue is divided into recitative and Beijing colloquial speech, the former employed by serious characters and the latter by young females and clowns. Character roles are strictly defined. The traditional repertoire of Beijing Opera includes more than 1,000 works, mostly taken from historical novels about political and military struggles.

In the early years of the People's Republic, the development of Beijing Opera was encouraged; many new operas on historical and modern themes were written, and earlier operas continued to be performed. As a popular art form, opera has usually been the first of the arts to reflect changes in Chinese policy. In the mid-1950s, for example, it was the first to benefit under the Hundred Flowers Campaign. Similarly, the attack in November 1965 on Beijing deputy mayor Wu Han and his historical play, "Hai Rui's Dismissal from Office," signaled the beginning of the Cultural Revolution. During the Cultural Revolution, most opera troupes were disbanded, performers and scriptwriters were persecuted, and all operas except the eight "model operas" approved by Jiang Qing and her associates were banned. After the fall of the Gang of Four in 1976, Beijing Opera enjoyed a revival and continued to be a very popular form of entertainment both in theaters and on television.

In traditional Chinese theater, no plays were performed in the vernacular or without singing. But at the turn of the twentieth century, Chinese students returning from abroad began to experiment with Western plays. Following the May Fourth Movement of 1919, a number of Western plays were staged in China, and Chinese playwrights began to imitate this form. The most notable of the new-style playwrights was Cao Yu (1910–1996). His major works — "Thunderstorm," "Sunrise," "Wilderness," and "Peking Man" — written between 1934 and 1940, have been widely read in China.

In the 1930s, theatrical productions performed by traveling Red Army cultural troupes in Communist-controlled areas were consciously used to promote party goals and political philosophy. By the 1940s, the theater was well established in Communist-controlled areas.

In the early years of the People's Republic, Western-style theater was presented mainly in the form of "socialist realism." During the Cultural Revolution, however, Western-style plays were condemned as "dead drama" and "poisonous weeds" and were not performed.

Following the Cultural Revolution, Western-style theater experienced a revival. Many new works appeared, and revised and banned plays from China and abroad were reinstated in the national repertoire. Many of the new plays strained at the limits of creative freedom and were alternately commended and condemned, depending on the political atmosphere. One of the most outspoken of the new breed of playwrights was Sha Yexin. His controversial play If I Were for Real, which dealt harshly with the cronyism and perquisites accorded party members, was first produced in 1979. In early 1980 the play was roundly criticized by Secretary General Hu Yaobang — the first public intervention in the arts since the Cultural Revolution. In the campaign against bourgeois liberalism in 1981 and the Anti-Spiritual Pollution Campaign in 1983, Sha and his works were again criticized. Through it all Sha continued to write for the stage and to defend himself and his works in the press. In late 1985 Sha Yexin was accepted into the CCP and appointed head of the Shanghai People's Art Theater, where he continued to produce controversial plays.

=== Music ===
"The Red Sun" Album featuring young Mao Zedong on the cover. A Guoyue theme album.

Chinese music appears to date back to the dawn of Chinese civilization, and documents and artifacts provide evidence of a well-developed musical culture as early as the Zhou dynasty (1027- 221 BCE). The Imperial Music Bureau, first established in the Qin dynasty (221-207 BCE), was greatly expanded under Emperor Wu of Han (140–87 BCE) and charged with supervising court music and military music and determining what folk music would be officially recognized. In subsequent dynasties, the development of Chinese music was strongly influenced by foreign music, especially that of Central Asia.

Chinese vocal music has traditionally been sung in a thin, nonresonant voice or in falsetto and is usually solo rather than choral. All traditional Chinese music is melodic rather than harmonic. Instrumental music is played on solo instruments or in small ensembles of plucked and bowed stringed instruments, flutes, and various cymbals, gongs, and drums. The scale has five notes.

The New Culture Movement of the 1910s and 1920s evoked a great deal of lasting interest in Western music as a number of Chinese musicians who had studied abroad returned to perform Western classical music and to compose works of their own based on the Western musical notation system. Symphony orchestras were formed in most major cities and performed to a wide audience in concert halls and on the radio. Popular music — greatly influenced by Western music, especially that of the United States — also gained a wide audience in the 1940s. After the 1942 Yan'an Forum on Literature and Art, a large-scale campaign was launched in the Communist-controlled areas to adapt folk music to create revolutionary songs to educate the largely illiterate rural population on party goals.

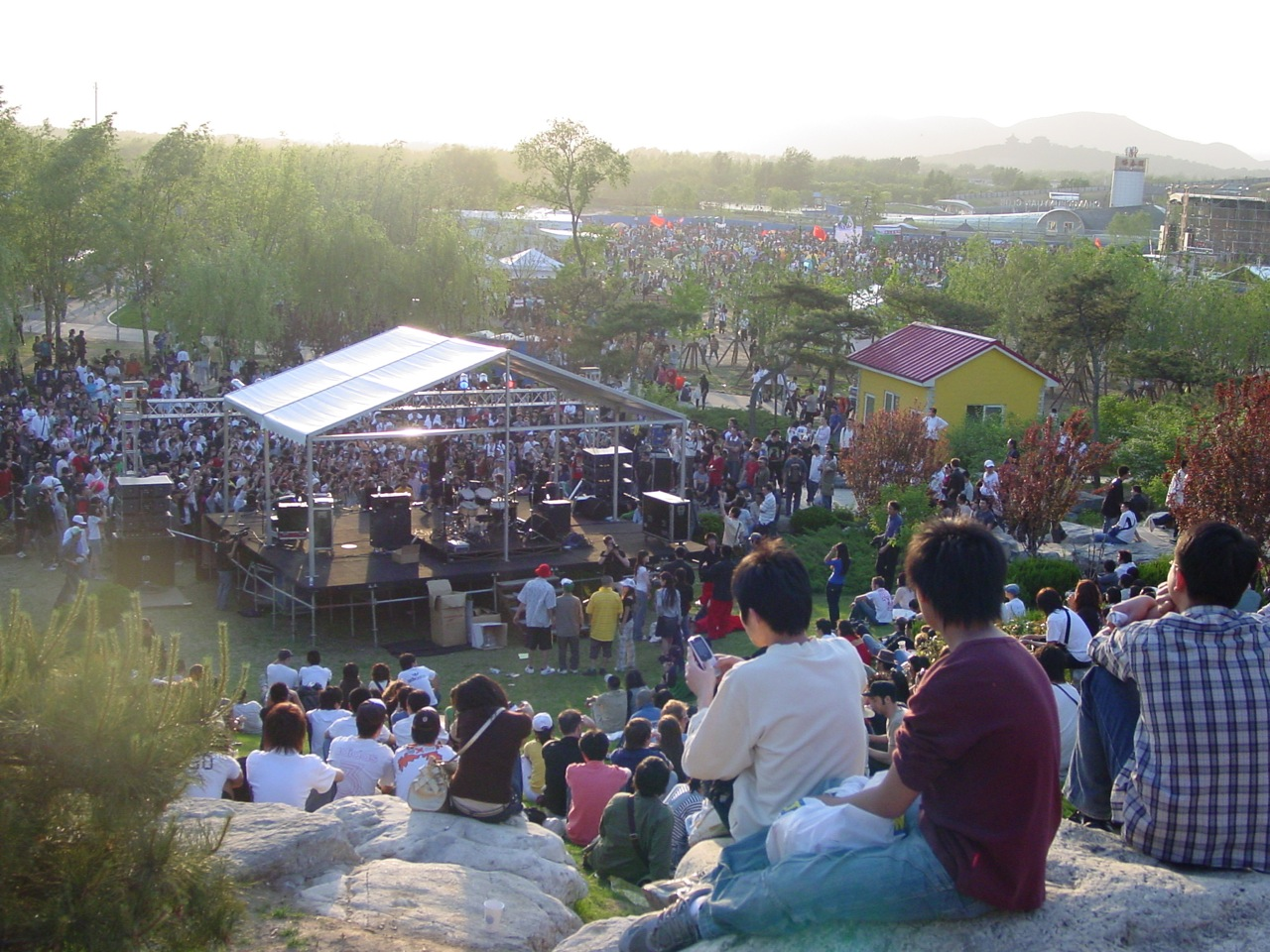
A performance at the 2007 Midi Modern Music Festival in Beijing

After the establishment of the People's Republic, revolutionary songs continued to be performed, and much of the remainder of popular music consisted of popular songs from the Soviet Union with the lyrics translated into Chinese. Symphony orchestras flourished throughout the country, performing Western classical music and compositions by Chinese composers. Conservatories and other institutions of musical instruction were developed and expanded in the major cities. A number of orchestras from Eastern Europe performed in China, and Chinese musicians and musical groups participated in a wide variety of international festivals.

During the height of the Cultural Revolution, musical composition and performance were greatly restricted. After the Cultural Revolution, musical institutions were reinstated, and musical composition and performance were revived. In 1980 the Chinese Musicians' Association was formally elected to the International Musicological Society. Chinese musical groups toured foreign countries, and foreign musical organizations performed in China. In the mid-1980s, popular ballads and Western folk and classical music still drew the greatest audiences, but other kinds of music, including previously banned Western jazz and rock and roll, were being performed and were receiving increasing acceptance, especially among young people.

==== The Legendary Four ====
The Legendary Four is a group of four composers—Tan Dun, Ye Xiaogang, Guo Wenjing, and Qu Xiaosong—who studied composition at the same time in the Central Conservatory of Music in Beijing during the Cultural Revolution. At the beginning of the revolution, they were all required to leave home and work on farms, where they gathered incomparable compositional experiences through the influences of traditional Chinese folk music.

=== Painting and calligraphy ===
In imperial times, painting and calligraphy were the most highly appreciated arts in court circles and were produced almost exclusively by amateurs — aristocrats and scholar-officials — who alone had the leisure to perfect the technique and sensibility necessary for great brushwork. Calligraphy was thought to be the highest and purest form of painting. The implements were the brush pen, made of animal hair, and black inks made from pine soot and animal glue. In ancient times, writing, as well as painting, was done on silk. But after the invention of paper in the first century CE, silk was gradually replaced by the new and cheaper material. Original writings by famous calligraphers have been greatly valued throughout China's history and are mounted on scrolls and hung on walls in the same way that paintings are.

Painting in the traditional style involves essentially the same techniques as calligraphy and is done with a brush dipped in black or colored ink; oils are not used. As with calligraphy, the most popular materials on which paintings are made are paper and silk. The finished work is then mounted on scrolls, which can be hung or rolled up. Traditional painting also is done in albums and on walls, lacquer work, and other media.

Beginning in the Tang dynasty (618–907), the primary subject matter of painting was the landscape, known as shanshui (mountain-water) painting. In these landscapes, usually monochromatic and sparse, the purpose was not to reproduce exactly the appearance of nature but rather to grasp an emotion or atmosphere so as to catch the "rhythm" of nature. In the Song dynasty (960–1279) times, landscapes of more subtle expression appeared; immeasurable distances were conveyed through the use of blurred outlines, mountain contours disappearing into the mist, and impressionistic treatment of natural phenomena. Emphasis was placed on the spiritual qualities of the painting and on the ability of the artist to reveal the inner harmony of man and nature, as perceived according to Taoist and Buddhist concepts (see Hundred Schools of Thought).

Beginning in the thirteenth century, there developed a tradition of painting simple subjects — a branch with fruit, a few flowers, or one or two horses. Narrative painting, with a wider color range and a much busier composition than the Song painting, was immensely popular at the time of the Ming dynasty (1368–1644).

During the Ming period, the first books illustrated with colored woodcuts appeared. As the techniques of color printing were perfected, illustrated manuals on the art of painting began to be published. Jieziyuan Huazhuan (Manual of the Mustard Seed Garden), a five-volume work first published in 1679, has been in use as a technical textbook for artists and students ever since.

Beginning with the New Culture Movement, Chinese artists started to adopt Western techniques. It also was during this time that oil painting was introduced to China.

In the early years of the People's Republic, artists were encouraged to employ socialist realism. Some Soviet socialist realism was imported without modification, and painters were assigned subjects and expected to mass-produce paintings. This regimen was considerably relaxed in 1953, and after the Hundred Flowers Campaign of 1956–57, traditional Chinese painting experienced a significant revival. Along with these developments in professional art circles, there was a proliferation of peasant art depicting everyday life in rural areas on wall murals and in open-air painting exhibitions.

During the Cultural Revolution, art schools were closed, and the publication of art journals and major art exhibitions ceased. Nevertheless, amateur art continued to flourish throughout this period.

Following the Cultural Revolution, art schools and professional organizations were reinstated. Exchanges were set up with groups of foreign artists, and Chinese artists began to experiment with new subjects and techniques.

== Hong Kong culture ==
The culture of Hong Kong is primarily a mix of Chinese and British influences, stemming from Lingnan Cantonese roots and Hong Kong's status as a British colony from 1841 to 1997. As a result, after the 1997 transfer of sovereignty to the People's Republic of China, Hong Kong has continued to develop a unique identity under the framework of One Country, Two Systems.

== Macau culture ==
Macau's urban landscape was shaped by the lengthy confluence of the Portuguese urban tradition with that of vernacular Chinese settlements. From Macau's formative years onwards, the fortified Christian city, ordered by strategic placements of civic and religious institutions, was surrounded by the commercial Chinese city. It has also been deemed to possess the oldest, most intact and consolidated array of striking architectural heritage of predominantly European influence interwoven with Chinese settlements.

== Contemporary performing arts ==
=== Motion pictures ===
Motion pictures were introduced to China in 1896, but the film industry was not started until 1917. During the 1920s, film technicians from the United States trained Chinese technicians in Shanghai, an early filmmaking center, and American influence continued to be felt there for the next two decades. In the 1930s and 1940s, several socially and politically important films were produced.

The film industry continued to develop after 1949. In the 17 years between the founding of the People's Republic and the Cultural Revolution, 603 feature films and 8,342 reels of documentaries and newsreels were produced. The first wide-screen film was produced in 1960. Animated films using a variety of folk arts, such as papercuts, shadow plays, puppetry, and traditional paintings, also were very popular for entertaining and educating children.

During the Cultural Revolution, the film industry was severely restricted. Most previous films were banned, and only a few new ones were produced. In the years immediately following the Cultural Revolution, the film industry again flourished as a medium of popular entertainment. Domestically produced films played to large audiences, and tickets for foreign film festivals sold quickly.

In the 1980s, the film industry fell on hard times, faced with the dual problems of competition from other forms of entertainment and concern on the part of the authorities that many of the popular thriller and martial arts films were socially unacceptable. In January 1986, the film industry was transferred from the Ministry of Culture to the newly formed Ministry of Radio, Cinema, and Television to bring it under "stricter control and management" and to "strengthen supervision over production."

=== Radio and television ===
Radio and television expanded rapidly in the 1980s as important means of mass communication and popular entertainment. By 1985 radio reached 75 percent of the population through 167 radio stations, 215 million radios, and a vast wired loudspeaker system. Television, growing at an even more rapid rate, reached two-thirds of the population through more than 104 stations (up from 52 in 1984 and 44 in 1983); an estimated 85 percent of the urban population had access to television.

- As radio and television stations grew, the content of the programming changed drastically from the political lectures and statistical lists of the previous period. Typical radio listening included soap operas based on popular novels and a variety of Chinese and foreign music.
- Most television shows were entertainment, including feature films, sports, drama, music, dance, and children's programming. In 1985 a survey of a typical week of television programming made by the Shanghai publication Wuxiandian Yu Dianshi (Journal of Radio and Television) revealed that more than half of the programming could be termed entertainment; education made up 24 percent of the remainder of the programming and news 15 percent. A wide cross-section of international news was presented each evening.
- Most news broadcasts had been borrowed from foreign news organizations, and a Chinese summary was dubbed over. China Central Television also contracted with several foreign broadcasters for entertainment programs. Between 1982 and 1985, six United States television companies signed agreements to provide American programs to China.

Chinese television drama has also become popular (similar to K-dramas), with Chinese television dramas such as Princess Agents, Nirvana in Fire, The Journey of Flower, Eternal Love, The Princess Weiyoung, Just One Smile Is Very Alluring, The Legend of Mi Yue, Scarlet Heart, General and I and others garnering billions of views on Chinese video websites, including iQiyi, Youku, QQ Video and Le Video. Some dramas have been remade into different languages or had sequels.

Chinese variety TV has also become widely successful with popular shows such as Happy Camp, Super Voice Girl, Sing! China, The Rap of China, The Singer, and more are gaining worldwide recognition, garnering from millions to billions of viewership and winning numerous awards.

=== Folk and variety arts ===
Folk and variety arts have a long history in China. One of the oldest forms of folk art is puppetry. Puppeteers use various kinds of puppets, including marionettes, rod puppets, cloth puppets, and wire puppets in performances incorporating folk songs and dances and some dialogues. The subject matter is derived mainly from children's stories and fables. The shadow play is a form of puppetry that is performed by moving figures made of animal skins or cardboard held behind a screen lit by lamplight. The subject matter and singing style in shadow plays are closely related to local opera. Another popular folk art is the quyi, which consists of various kinds of storytelling and comic monologues and dialogues, often to the accompaniment of clappers, drums, or stringed instruments.

Variety arts, including tightrope walking, acrobatics, animal acts, and sleight of hand, date back at least as far as the Han dynasty (206 BCE – 220 CE) and were very popular in the imperial court. Later, many of these feats were incorporated into traditional theater, and they continued to be performed by itinerant troupes. As these troupes traveled around the countryside, they developed and enriched their repertoire. Since 1949 these art forms have gained new respectability. Troupes have been established in the provinces, autonomous regions, and special municipalities, and theaters specifically dedicated to the variety arts have been built in major cities. Some troupes have become world-famous, playing to packed houses at home and on foreign tours.

=== Stand-up comedy ===
Stand-up comedy is an emerging art form. At least until 2008, China blocked access to Comedy Central's website, deeming the website unsuitable for China's citizens. Hong Kong is the only city in China to offer a full-time comedy club, where both English and Cantonese speaking comedians perform.

Each October, Hong Kong hosts an annual comedy festival, the HK International Comedy Festival.

== Publishing ==
Publishing in China dated from the invention of woodblock printing around the eighth century CE and was greatly expanded with the invention of movable clay type in the eleventh century. From the tenth to the twelfth century, Kaifeng, Meishan, Hangzhou, and Jianyang were major printing centers. In the nineteenth century, China acquired movable lead type and photogravure printing plates and entered the age of modern book and magazine printing. The largest of the early publishing houses were the Commercial Press (Shangwu Yinshuguan), established in 1897, and the China Publishing House (Zhonghua Shuju), established in 1912, both of which were still operating in 1987. Following the May Fourth Movement of 1919, publishers, especially those associated with various groups of intellectuals, proliferated. During the Chinese Civil War, New China Booksellers (Xinhua Shudian) published a large amount of Marxist literature and educational materials in the communist-controlled areas. On the eve of the establishment of the People's Republic in 1949, there were over 700 New China Booksellers offices.

Between 1949 and 1952, the New China Booksellers offices scattered throughout the country were nationalized and given responsibility for publishing, printing, and distribution. Also, several small private publishers were brought under joint state/private ownership, and by 1956 all private publishers had been nationalized. After a brief flourishing during the Hundred Flowers Campaign of 1956–57, the publishing industry came under strong political pressure in the Anti-Rightist Campaign of 1957. The industry had not fully recovered from this campaign when it was plunged into the Cultural Revolution, a period in which publishing was severely curtailed and limited mainly to political tracts supporting various campaigns. Following the Cultural Revolution, publishing again flourished in unprecedented ways. In 1982 the China National Publishing Administration, the umbrella organization of Chinese publishers, was placed under the Ministry of Culture, but the actual management of the industry was directed through four systems of administration: direct state administration; administration by committees or organizations of the State Council or the party Central Committee; armed forces administration; and administration by provinces, autonomous regions, or special municipalities.

In 1984 statistics showed that 17 of the country's 418 publishing establishments were in Shanghai, whereas Beijing was home to 160 publishers. In 1985 plans were announced to foster the growth of the publishing industry in Chongqing, Xi'an, Wuhan, and Shenyang to take some of the workloads from Beijing and Shanghai.

Different publishers were assigned to specific kinds of publications. For example, the People's Publishing House was responsible for publishing works on politics, philosophy, and the social sciences; the People's Literature Publishing House produced ancient and modern Chinese and foreign literature and literary history and theory; the China Publishing House had the principal responsibility for collating and publishing Chinese classical literary, historical, and philosophical works; and the Commercial Press was the principal publisher of Chinese-to-foreign-language reference works and translations of foreign works in the social sciences. Other publishers dealt with works in specialized fields of science.

In addition to the routine method of distributing books to bookstores in major cities, other methods of distribution were devised to meet the special needs of readers in urban and rural areas throughout the country. Mobile bookshops made regular visits to factories, mines, rural villages, and People's Liberation Army units, and service was provided in those locations through which individuals could request books. Arrangements were made with the libraries of educational institutions and enterprises to supply them with the books that they required, and books specifically applicable to certain industries were systematically recommended and provided to the departments concerned. Also, book fairs and exhibits frequently were provided at meetings and in public parks on holidays and other special occasions.

== Deregulation of Chinese video game market ==
In the fall of 2013, the government of China announced that they were admitting foreign game companies to sell their games in China.

=== Background and before the deregulation ===
In 2000, the CCP government banned people in China from selling stationary-type home game machines made by foreign companies because the government thought the game machines were harmful to young people. However, one year after the ban, online games became popular, and the game problem of young people was not solved. In addition, Nintendo cooperated with Wei Yen to sell iQue Player, which can play Nintendo 64 games in China legally. On the other hand, underground video game copies prevailed. For example, Wii consoles were copied and sold as Vii. PS3s were also copied. As a result, the regulation did not make sense.

=== The response of several companies ===
The CPC government canceled temporarily the sales prohibition measures of the foreign-made-goods game machines, which had continued over the past 14 years. Thereby, a business opportunity was born to the game machine maker. However, many dealers were adopting unlicensed software, forcing each company to fight with an illegal copy first. In addition, many Chinese consumers like the free game on a personal computer or a personal digital assistant, so this also becomes a barrier with which each company advances to the market. The reaction to the removal of the ban on the China game market varies by company. For example, Sony's PlayStation is excellent in security compared with a competition model, and since illegal software-oriented reconstruction is comparatively difficult, an infringement problem is not a threat so much to the business of the company. It has been suggested that a console company could find a niche if it catered to users of unauthorized video game copies. Nevertheless, the press officer of Sony Computer Entertainment only commented, "it is recognized as the Chinese market being promising, and for possibility succeedingly." Microsoft has not mentioned concrete plans for the China game machine market, either. On the other hand, it was said to Reuters that there is no plan for the press officer of Nintendo to advance to the Chinese market. The game market in China is the third in the world which ranks next to the United States and Japan, and is an attractive market for each company.

=== Consideration and comparison of articles about the deregulation of selling games in China ===
Yomiuri picks up on Sony and only estimates that many Chinese people will buy games from Sony. However, Asahi, who picks up Sony too, says that it is difficult for Sony to sell their games in China, because there are a lot of games that are copied illegally and it is likely to be censored by the government of China and happen competition between game companies. Zaikei Shimbun says about Sony and Microsoft, and says that these two companies will not be able to benefit in China, because of the response of the government and the current situation of China. Reuter picks up on Nintendo and says that Nintendo will release a new game for developing countries, including China. According to this article, Nintendo will sell its game in a new way that other game companies had not used yet. Unlike many other articles, this article implies that Nintendo will be able to benefit in China. Yahoo News, like Yomiuri, does not say about many obstacles for game companies. Nikkei’s article was written when selling games was not deregulated, but it was written the reason why the government of China regulated something, why they considered deregulation, and what process they needed to deregulate selling games. It was also written that what will happen in the game industry after they deregulate about selling games and will Sony, Microsoft, and Nintendo be able to benefit from selling their games. Like this, each media have various opinions. So, it is important that we consider many facts and recognize what is a true fact.

=== Games in the world and in China ===
==== Sales of major Companies ====
On April 16, 2014, Sony Interactive Entertainment publicized its sales figures. According to them, they had sold seven million PlayStation 4 consoles in China, as well as 20 million pieces of game software. Microsoft revealed that they had sold three million Xbox One consoles as of 2013.(7) Nintendo revealed that they had sold sixteen million Nintendo 3DS and Wii U consoles.

==== People’s reaction ====
A Chinese portal site, NetEase, did a questionnaire survey. People were asked which game console they want to buy after the deregulation. PS4, PS Vita, Xbox One, and so on were included in the choices. Until July 15, 2014, 6488 people had given answers to this question, and PS4 was selected by more than half of them. The number of those who had chosen Xbox One was about presumably 640, only 10 percent of all. Nintendo was not mentioned.

According to the article written by Forbes, the stock prices of Sony and Nintendo rose in Japan after China had declared deregulation. This means people expected that these two companies will succeed in China. Microsoft stock also rose, but far lower. These two companies have been stronger than Microsoft in Asia. Therefore, in the future, we may see Sony and Nintendo compete intensively in China.

==== Future in China ====
Judging from this information, Sony seems to win Microsoft, perhaps and Nintendo, in the video game market, both in the world and in China. However, the situation is not so simple. There is some concern for game companies. First, PRC government official said that the deregulation is temporary; in other words, selling games will be banned again someday. Second, if game companies want to sell their products, they must produce in a free-trade zone in Shanghai, and foreign companies’ games will have to undergo strict censorship by the PRC government.

== Cultural policy ==
Cultural policy in the People's Republic of China (PRC) since the beginning of Xi Jinping's administration in 2012 has largely continued the trend since reform and opening up that the state will "manage culture" but no longer "run culture". State bodies that set cultural policies or regulations include the Publicity Department of the Chinese Communist Party, the National Radio and Television Administration, among other bodies. Cultural policy milestones during Xi's administration include the 2014 Beijing Forum on Literature and Art and the formulation of Xi Jinping Thought on Culture.

During the Mao Zedong era, the ideological basis of the PRC's cultural policy was the Yan'an Forum. These 1942 speeches emphasized that art should translate the concepts of the Chinese Communist Revolution for rural peasants. In this view, revolutionary art should portray the lives of the peasants, who should be the principal audience for it. Ranges of artistic style and criticisms increased during the Hundred Flowers Movement. During the Cultural Revolution, cultural policy institutions were greatly disrupted.

In the era of reform and opening up begun by Deng Xiaoping, many artists and art works that had been criticized during the Cultural Revolution were politically rehabilitated, and cultural policy institutions were restored to normal operation. The state also reduced its financial support for funding culture as part of the principle that the state would "manage culture" but no longer "run culture". Subsequent administrations have generally continued the policy approach of "managing" but not "running" culture.

=== Tainted artists ===
The Chinese Government considers artists and celebrities who engage in illegal and/or problematic behavior such as drug use, prostitution, tax evasion, extramarital affairs, and support for political positions other than those held by the CCP to be "tainted artists." In 2014 all "tainted artists" were blocked on all Chinese broadcasting platforms by order of the State Administration of Press, Publication, Radio, Film and Television.

== See also ==
- Color in Chinese culture
- Education in the People's Republic of China
- Libraries in China
- Museums in China
- Numbers in Chinese culture
- Social issues in the People's Republic of China
