= Beijing Forum on Literature and Art =

2014 Forum on Culture in the PRC

During the October 2014 Forum on the Work of Literature and the Arts in Beijing (wenyi gongzuo zuotanhui 文艺工作座谈会, or commonly, the Beijing Forum on Literature and Art), Xi Jinping delivered a speech on cultural policy and the role of literature and the arts in society. Xi emphasized that literary and artistic workers should create art that helps build moral qualities and socialist core values.

== Background ==
Consistent with Mao Zedong's view articulated during the Yan'an Forum on Literature and Art, Xi believes works of art should be judged by political criteria. On 15 October 2014, General Secretary XI Jinping emulated the Yan'an Forum on Literature and Art with his speech at the Beijing Forum on Literature and Art. Xi gathered representatives of literary and artistic circles, such as the China Writers Association, for the forum.

== Xi's speech ==
Describing the global significance of literature, Xi stated, "History and reality both show that human civilization is created collectively by all countries and all peoples. When I go abroad for visits, what enthuses me most are the products of civilization created by the peoples of various countries and nations. The treasures of world civilization are everywhere." Xi cited examples from ancient Greece, Russia, the United States, and India, before turning to Chinese examples. Xi stated, "China has produced stellar masters of literature and art, leaving behind a vast multitude of exquisite works, not only providing the Chinese nation with ample nourishment, but contributing a glorious chapter to world civilization."

Regarding literature, Xi primarily emphasized moral qualities, stating:

Literature and arts help build the soul, and writers and artists are the engineers of the human soul. Good works of literature and art ought to be like sunlight in a blue sky, like a gentle breeze in spring. They can inspire one's mind, warm one's spirit, mold one's life, and wipe out all corrupt and decadent trends. "He who writes works to be passed on to future generations, must first have a mind that can be passed on to those generations."

Xi also referenced Reform-era cultural discourses of "truth, goodness, and beauty", stating, "[W]e must transmit truth, goodness, and beauty, as well as a sense of value that is directed towards improvement and goodness. We must guide people to strengthen their moral judgment and their sense of moral pride, guide them to yearn for and to pursue a life in which they heed morality, respect morality, and observe morality."

Xi stated that literature and art "play a unique role in cultivating and spreading socialist core values". According to Xi, literary and artistic workers "should vividly embody core socialist values in literary and artistic creations, and with their vivid and life-like writings and images tell people what is supposed to be affirmed and praised and what must be opposed and denied. Like the breeze and rain in spring, they should quietly nurture the world." Among the socialist core values, Xi emphasized patriotism as "the most profound, most fundamental, and most eternal."

Xi praised the work of two writers of online literature, Zhou Xiaoping and Hua Qianfang, for spreading positive energy.

Xi's speech at the forum influenced the December 2014 Guiding Opinions for the Healthy Development of Online Literature issued by the State Administration of Press, Publication, Radio, Film and Television.

== See also ==
- Xi Jinping Thought on Culture
