= Chen Xuezhao =

Chinese writer and journalist

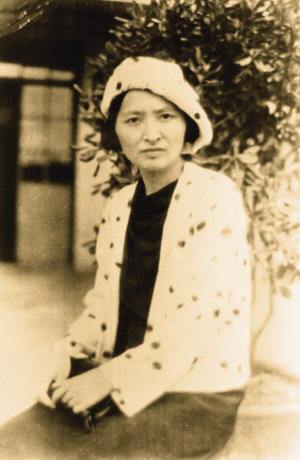
Chen Xuezhao in 1936

Chen Xuezhao (Chinese: 陈学昭; Wade–Giles: Ch'en Hsueh-chao; April 17, 1906 – 1991) was a Chinese writer and journalist. She was earlier known as Chen Shuzhang or Chen Shuying. She used the pen names Ye Qu, Shi Wei, Xue Zhao and Hui. She was one of the most prolific Chinese women writers of the 20th century. Chen gave her support to Mao Zedong's policy on Art and Literature.

== Life ==
The daughter of parents from Henan province, Chen was born in Haining in Zhejiang province in 1906. She was educated at the first Girls' Normal School in China in Nantong County. This school was founded in 1902 by Zhang Jian. Afterwards, she attended Shanghai Patriotic Girls' College. She joined the Qiancao Literary Society and published her first work Wo suo qiwang de xin funü ("The New Women of My Ideal") in 1923. Furthermore, in 1927, Chen published an article in the New Woman magazine "explaining the new phenomenon of women choosing to remain single" and instead of raising a family, "participated in civic life" as many other Chinese New Women were doing. Chen taught school in Zhejiang and Beijing. In 1924, she published Juanlu ("Weary Travels"). She helped establish the magazines Yusi and Xin nüxing. From 1927 to 1935, Chen studied western literature in Paris. From 1927 to 1931, she was a special correspondent for the Dàgōng bào newspaper. During this time, she married a Chinese medical student in France. After completing a PhD at the University of Clermont-Ferrand in 1935, she returned to China with her husband; the couple divorced in 1941.

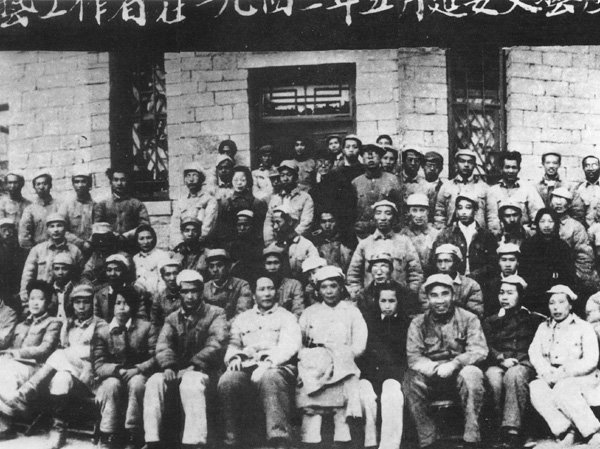
Mao Zedong and others at the Yan'an Forum on Literature and Art including Chen (5th from the left in the third row)

In 1940, she went to Yan'an and became editor of the fourth section of the Jiefang ribao newspaper and a literacy teacher at the Central Party School of the Chinese Communist Party there. In 1942 she attended the Yan'an Forum with Mao Zedong to determine Chinese communist policy on the Arts. Mao published a paper entitled "Talks at the Ya'nan Conference on Arts and Literature". This was an important document of national policy which Chen supported and this was the basis for a major cultural rectification programme.

In 1945, she heard that she had been specifically praised by Mao Zedong. Later that year, she joined the Chinese Communist Party and her application was swiftly approved with only a note to study more Lenin. The following year she became editor of the fourth section of the Dongbei ribao newspaper. In 1949, she became CCP committee secretary at Zhejiang University. In 1953, she was part of a Chinese delegation to the USSR. In 1957, she was labelled as a rightist and fell out of favour. During the Cultural Revolution, Chen took a hiatus from writing. She resumed her writing in 1978.

Chen also translated some works by Balzac and Charles de Gaulle's L'Appel from French into Chinese. She died in 1991.

== Selected works ==
- Yi Bali (Memories of Paris), essays (1929)
- Ru meng (Like a dream), essays (1929)
- Nanfeng de meng (Dream of the south wind), novel (1929)
- Gongzuozhe shi meilide (To be working is beautiful), novel, largely autobiographical (1949)
- Tudi (The land), novel (1953)
- Chun cha (Spring tea), novel (1957)
- Fuchen zayi (Random Reflections of Life) (1981), translated into English as Surviving the storm : a memoir (1990)
