= Zhou Xiaoping =

Chinese essayist and popular blogger (born 1981)

- 周小平
- Born: Zhou Ping (周平); Zigong, Sichuan, China
- Occupations: Essayist, blogger
- Spouse: Wang Fang
- Writing career
- Language: Chinese
- Period: 1996–present
- Genre: Prose
- Notable work: Please Do Not Fail This Era!

Zhou Xiaoping (Chinese: 周小平; pinyin: Zhōu Xiǎopíng) is a Chinese essayist and popular blogger. He is known for his support of the ruling Chinese Communist Party, and for his most well-known work, Please Do Not Fail This Era!.

== Early life ==
Zhou Xiaoping was born and raised in Zigong, Sichuan.

== Career ==
After junior high school, Zhou started to publish works in 1996. "Cutlassfish Zhou" (周带鱼) became the nickname for his nationalist, pro-Communist, pro-Chinese government and anti-American writing.

He is a supporter of the Chinese Communist Party and has expressed nationalist, anti-American and anti-Western sentiment.

Zhou is noted for praising Xi Jinping, the General Secretary of the Chinese Communist Party, at the 2014 Beijing Forum on Literature and Art. Xi praised Zhou along with Hua Qianfang, another internet writer, for spreading positive energy in 2014.

== Personal life ==
On 25 March 2017, he married opera singer Wang Fang.

== Works ==
- Please Do Not Fail This Era! (请不要辜负这个时代)
- Young, do you really know about this country? (少年，你真的了解这个国家吗？)
- Where did our heroes go? (我们的英雄都去哪儿了)
- Nine Tricks of the United States Cultural Cold War (美国对华文化冷战的九大绝招)
