= Superstition in China =

As an ancient civilization with a long history and rich cultural traditions, China's "superstition" phenomenon is not only deeply rooted in people's daily lives, but also closely linked to national governance, religious development and social structure evolution. The origin of superstition can be traced back to primitive society. Its early forms were nature worship, totem beliefs and shamanic rituals. These religious prototypes left a large number of archaeological traces in the Yangshao culture, such as painted pottery totems and sacrificial sites. With the replacement of the Xia, Shang and Zhou dynasties, the belief in ghosts and gods and destiny was gradually institutionalized and became an important tool for political legitimacy and moral education.

With the changes and development of the times and the spread and development of Taoism and Buddhism, superstition gradually merged with religious beliefs, imperial power ideas and social behavior patterns. It shows a strong political and ideological color. The pursuit of immortality and destiny prophecy in the Qin Shihuang era is a typical example of superstitious culture serving the power structure. In the later period of the development of the times, folk customs such as feng shui, eight characters, and sacrifices, which were regarded as superstitions, gradually became common among the people.

== The origin of Chinese superstition ==
The origin of Chinese superstition can be traced back to ancient times and is closely related to primitive society's nature worship, belief in spirits and deities, and shamanistic culture.

=== Totem beliefs in primitive Chinese society ===
==== Yangshao culture ====
The Yangshao Culture (circa 5000–3000 BCE) was one of the core cultures of China's Neolithic period. Its painted pottery designs, settlement remains, and burial customs contain rich traces of totemic beliefs.

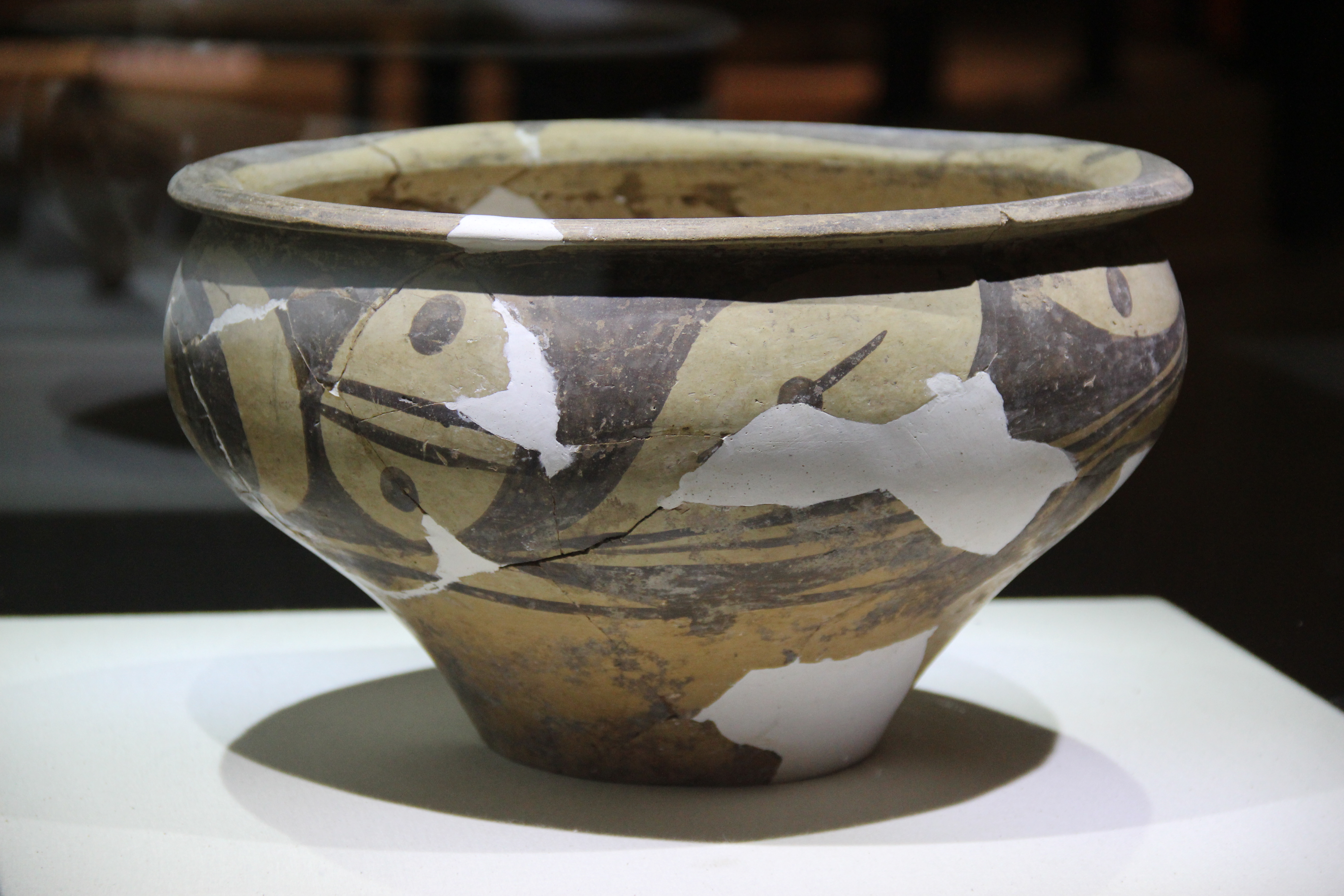
Yangshao culture

A totem is a form of belief in which a primitive clan regards a certain animal, plant, or natural object as its ancestor or guardian deity. Archaeological discoveries from the Yangshao Culture provide important evidence for studying early totem worship in China.

=== Xia ===
During the Xia Dynasty, religious beliefs mainly continued the witchcraft tradition of primitive religion, emphasizing the mysterious connection between man, nature and ancestors. Sacrificial activities were frequent, and ancestor worship became an important part of the national religion. The Analects of Confucius: Taibo records that Xia Yu "showed filial piety to ghosts and gods", indicating that the belief in ghosts and gods had been incorporated into the national ritual system at that time.

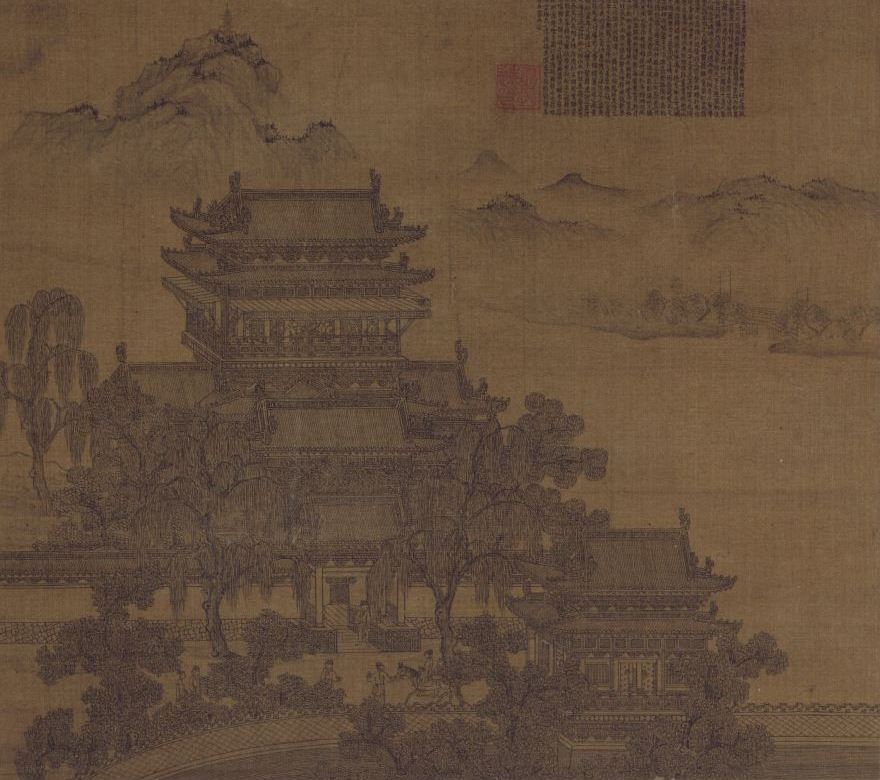

"Book of Rites: Biaoji" records: "The Xia Dynasty respected destiny, served ghosts, revered gods but kept them at a distance, and was close to people but loyal to them." This shows that although the Xia Dynasty respected gods, it emphasized human affairs and morality more, and advocated "respecting ghosts and gods but keeping them at a distance", which reflected the awe of gods while paying attention to practical human relations.

==== Shang ====
The Shang Dynasty worshipped the "Emperor" as the supreme god. The "Emperor" had extensive powers. He not only controlled the wind, clouds, thunder and rain in nature, but also controlled the disasters and blessings in the world. With the development of civilization and the improvement of productivity, the worship of the supreme god "Emperor" was replaced by the worship of ancestor gods. The concept of human king gradually became clear and prominent.

==== Zhou ====
The Zhou people proposed the concept of "Heaven's Mandate", believing that "Heaven" was the supreme god who gave the monarch the legitimacy of rule. "The Book of Documents: Zhoushu" states: "Heaven's Mandate is not constant, only virtue is its support." This emphasizes that virtue is the key to obtaining Heaven's Mandate, reflecting the combination of politics and morality. The Zhou Dynasty also developed a ritual system, using the ritual and music system to regulate social order, institutionalizing and ethicalizing the concept of Heaven's Mandate.

=== Qin and Han Dynasties to Tang and Song Dynasties: Fusion of Taoism, Buddhism and Folk Beliefs (221 BC–1279) ===
==== Qin ====
After Qin Shihuang unified the six kingdoms, he strongly advocated the concept of divine authority and destiny to consolidate the legitimacy of his rule. He frequently offered sacrifices to the heavens, the earth, and the mountains, and sent alchemists such as Xu Fu to the east to seek immortality, trying to achieve immortality through the protection of the gods. At the same time, the theory of "prophecy" was prevalent during the Qin Dynasty, that is, to prove the destiny of the imperial power through mysterious prophecies and auspicious signs.

As a cultural phenomenon that combines mysterious prophecies and political propaganda, prophecy showed a strong function of social mobilization and public opinion guidance during the Qin Dynasty. Although the Qin Dynasty was short-lived, it produced a large number of prophecies of the country's demise. These prophecies are mainly divided into three categories: curse type, deification type, and vague type. They were spread by cursing Qin Shihuang, deifying anti-Qin figures, and implicitly hinting at the ownership of the future regime, which played an important role in inciting people to resist and gathering anti-Qin forces.

== Customs regarded as superstitions ==
=== Feng shui ===
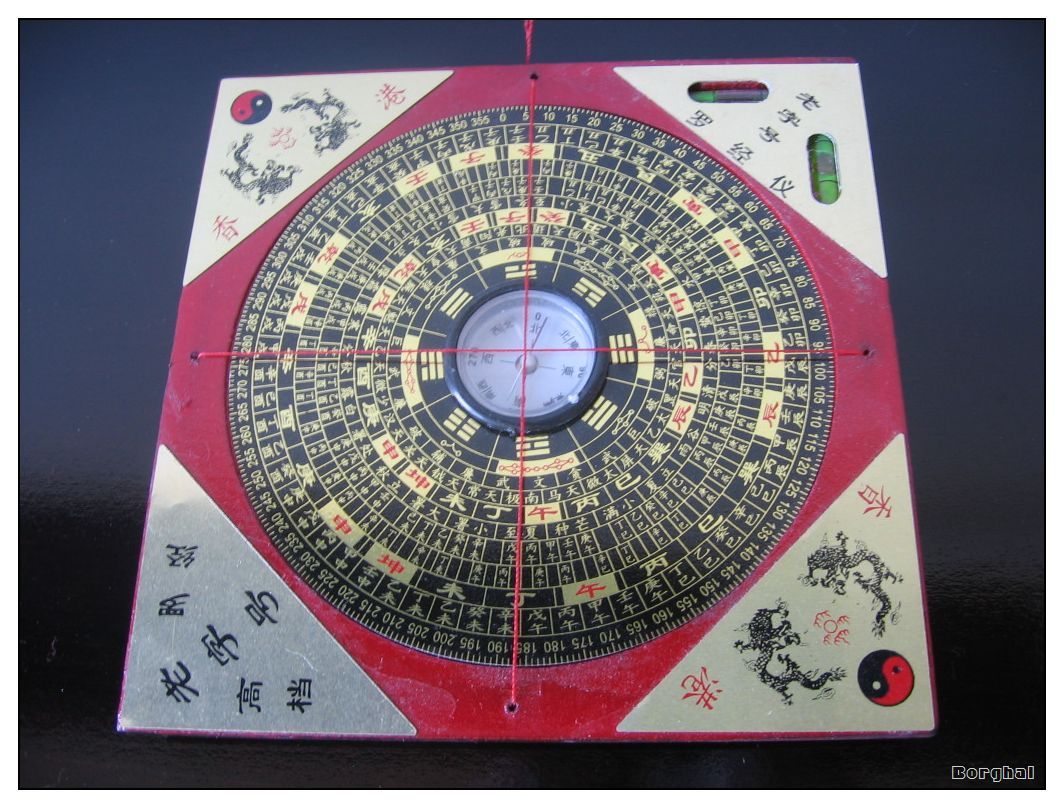

Feng shui, also known as Kan Yu, is an ancient Chinese philosophy of environmental planning and spatial arrangement, aimed at harmonizing the relationship between humans and their natural surroundings to attract good fortune and avoid misfortune. It originated from the observation of natural laws and integrates concepts such as Yin and Yang, the Five Elements, the Bagua (Eight Trigrams), and the flow of qi (energy). Feng shui is defined as an environmental healing art based on the flow and balance of qi, rather than merely a technique for arranging furniture or buildings. It emphasizes that Feng shui is not just about adjusting external spaces, but also a means to achieve holistic harmony of the body, mind, and spirit.

=== Ba Zi ===
Bazi, also known as the Four Pillars of Destiny, is an important tool in traditional Chinese metaphysics used to analyze a person's fate and character. The term "Bazi" refers to the eight characters derived from the year, month, day, and hour of a person's birth, with each time point consisting of one Heavenly Stem and one Earthly Branch. Therefore, it is called "Bazi" or "Eight Characters."

=== Sacrifice ===
Sacrifice, originating from the belief in the harmonious coexistence of heaven and earth, is rooted in ancient faith. According to the findings of modern anthropology and archaeology, the two most primitive beliefs in human history are the belief in heaven and earth, and the belief in ancestors. These beliefs arose from early humans' reverence for nature and their ancestors, which led to various forms of worship and sacrificial rituals. Festivals like the Spring Festival, Dragon Boat Festival, Qingming Festival, and Chongyang Festival are holidays that originated from these primitive beliefs, dedicated to sacrificing to the gods of heaven and earth and to ancestors. The grand sacrificial ceremonies to heaven and earth are, in the ultimate sense of human thinking, a spiritual experience of communication between humans and deities, connecting the upper and lower realms, and realizing the harmonious coexistence of humans, deities, and nature. Sacrificial activities involve offerings, burning incense, and bowing with solemnity and precision. The rituals and offerings have specific guidelines. Traditional customs dictate that offerings are presented to deities or ancestors as a sign of reverence, seeking their protection and blessings.

== 20th–21st centuries ==
When the modern Christian and secular views of superstition became significant in China, various practices of Confucianism, Daoism, Buddhism, and folk religion became frequently characterized as superstitious. After the founding of the Republic of China, intellectuals and politicians increasingly viewed folk religion as superstitious and believed that it demonstrated the backwardness and political weakness of the Chinese people. The ROC's campaigns against superstition included efforts to modernize funeral practices.

Shortly after the October 1949 proclamation of the People's Republic of China in 1949, the newly-formed state under the Chinese Communist Party (CCP) labeled folk religion as "feudal superstition" (封建迷信 fèngjiàn míxìn, a phrase also sometimes used to characterize traditional marriage practices, gambling, or obscene literature). In the 1950s, the Communist Party largely viewed superstition as a "thought issue" (sixang wenti 思想问题) that could only be solved gradually. Mao Zedong illustrated this view in this statement that "peasants themselves erected pusa [Bodhisattva] and they would use their own hands to cast aside pusa at some point."

Since the Reform and Opening Up period starting in 1978, activities once deemed superstitious have become more publicly accepted. After the early 2000s, many formerly superstitious activities came to be viewed as part of China's intangible cultural heritage.

In urban areas, especially first-tier cities, traditional superstitions such as feng shui, fortune-telling, and choosing auspicious dates are considered "superstitious" by many young people, but they still play a role in important moments such as real estate design, weddings, and business openings. Some entrepreneurs and decision makers still consult feng shui masters or fortune-telling experts before making major business decisions, showing the deep connection between traditional beliefs and modern economic behavior. In the 21st century, some government officials who had consulted feng shui and fortune tellers have been expelled from the CCP.

In rural or remote areas, traditional sacrificial rituals and worship of gods are still regarded as important community activities, which not only have cultural inheritance functions, but also strengthen the cohesion within the village. For example, on important festivals such as Qingming Festival and Spring Festival, ancestor worship, burning paper, and offerings are still indispensable rituals for many families. In some places, phenomena such as "inviting gods", "exorcism", and "feng shui masters going to the village" still have a certain social influence.
