= Li Song (painter) =

Chinese court painter in the Song dynasty

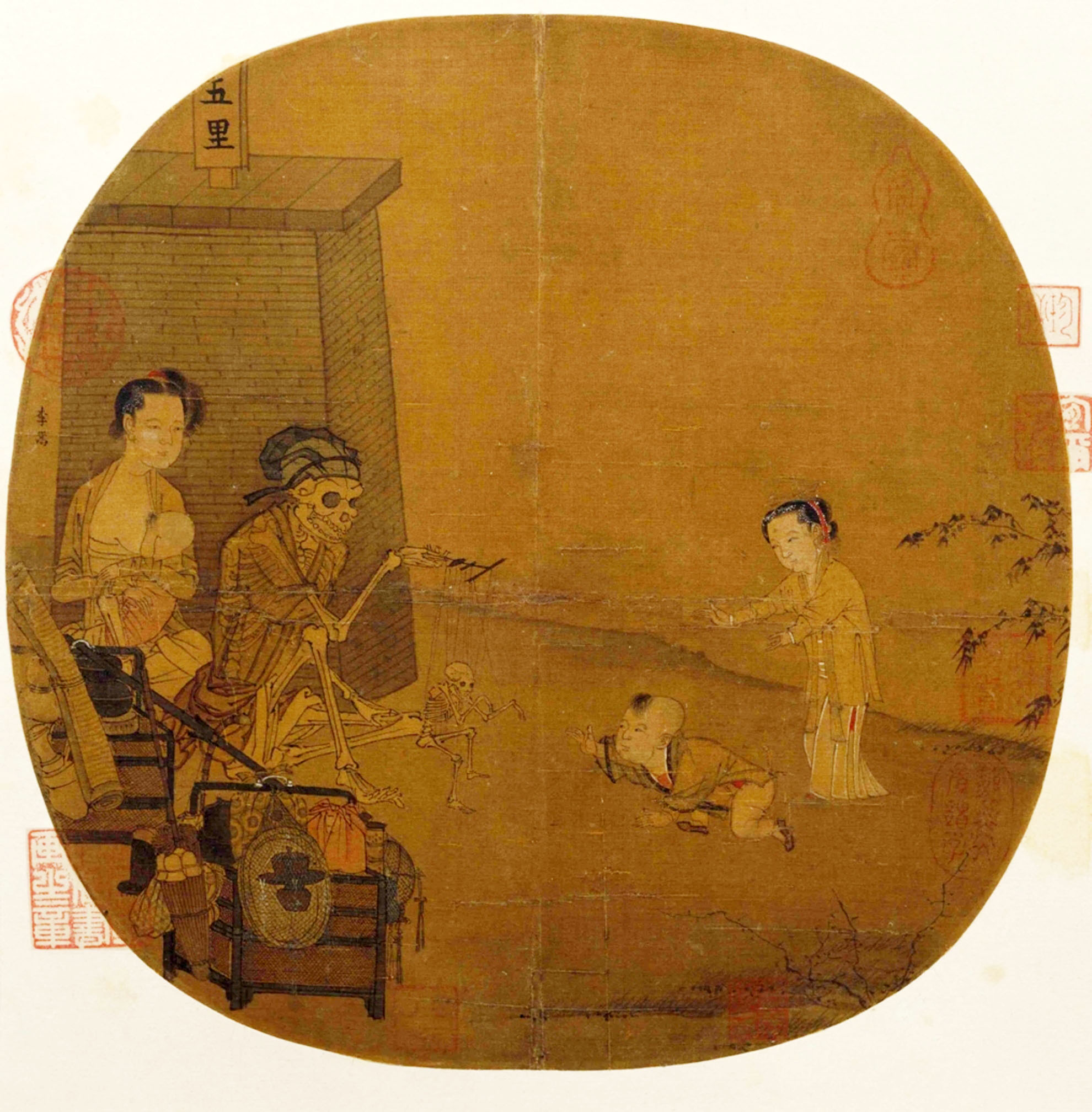
Skeleton Fantasy Show (骷髏幻戲圖)

Li Song (Chinese: 李嵩; pinyin: Lǐ Sōng; Wade–Giles: Li Sung; active 1190–1230) was a Chinese imperial court painter in the Song dynasty.

Song was born in Qian Tang (錢塘 – present day Hangzhou). He was originally a carpenter by trade, but was later adopted and trained by the court painter Li Congxun (李從訓). He was known for painting human figures.

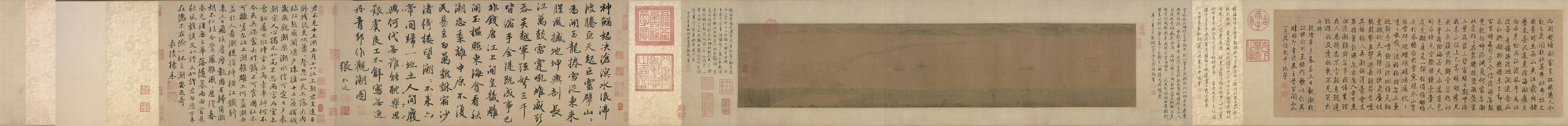
View of Qiantang Tide-hand scroll – ink and color on silk, 17.4 high x 83 wide cm. Located at the Palace Museum, Beijing.

A notable painting by Li Song is Skeleton Fantasy Show, in which a skeleton uses a dancing skeleton puppet to attract children, while a mother breastfeeding her child is looking at them.
