= Positive energy (China) =

Chinese Communist Party slogan

- Simplified Chinese: 正能量
Transcriptions
Standard Mandarin
- Hanyu Pinyin: Zhèng néngliàng

Positive energy is an expression commonly used in Chinese Communist Party political discourse, referring to the need for uplifting messages as opposed to critical or negative ones. First popularized in 2012 by Xi Jinping at the 18th National Congress of the Chinese Communist Party, it has since become central to other areas of CCP and government policy. Chinese internet censors typically remove content that is not deemed to promote positive energy.

== Definition ==
The term refers to the need for uplifting messages in the news as opposed to critical or negative ones. It is closely related to public opinion guidance.

== Background ==
The term "positive energy" originated from a book called The Hidden Messages in Water written by Japanese author Masaru Emoto in 2005, which was published in China in 2009. The term first appeared in the public eye in China in 2010. At that time, a Shenzhen court found Song Shanmu, the owner of a local education company, guilty of raping a female employee. According to reports, Song Shanmu told the female employee before raping her: "You are full of negative energy now, I need to help you deal with it." This statement evolved into a meme on the Internet: "You are full of negative energy, I need to inject you with positive energy."

At the end of 2012, "positive energy" was selected by Yaowen Jiaozi as one of the top ten popular online terms in China in 2012. According to the editorial department of Yaowen Jiaozi, positive energy was originally a physics term, but due to the book Rip It Up published by British psychology professor Richard Wiseman, which was translated to Chinese as Positive Energy, the term positive energy was given a concept in psychology and other social sciences. In 2013, Xinhua Daily interpreted the "performance principle" of the book Positive Energy as follows: behavior leads to the generation of emotions. People can obtain corresponding emotional feelings by expressing certain emotions. It also stated that behaviors such as trust, open-mindedness, joy, and enterprising make people have positive energy, while behaviors such as avoidance, selfishness, suspicion, frustration, and depression make people have negative energy.

== Use in policy ==
The term was popularized in 2012 by General Secretary Xi Jinping at the 18th National Congress of the Chinese Communist Party where he used the phrase to call on officials to enhance the country's soft power and promote better relations with the United States. In 2013, Lu Wei, then director of the State Internet Information Office, made a high-profile demand that Internet companies spread positive energy on the Internet. Lu Wei addressed more than two million propaganda workers in China, explaining how to positively guide public opinion to meet the leader's expectations in order to spread positive energy on the Internet; the relevant hot topics listed in the examples included economic trends, price control, reform, employment, housing, social security and income distribution.

In August 2013, Lu Wei hosted the "Internet Celebrity Social Responsibility Forum" and released the Seven Bottom Lines, saying: "Everyone agrees that internet celebrities should assume more social responsibility and spread positive energy." In November 2013, Xi Jinping, during his inspection tour in Shandong, demanded that Party committees at all levels must unify their thinking and actions with the central government's decisions and plans, and gather powerful positive energy to comprehensively promote reform and opening up. For a time, "positive energy" swept across Chinese society. From political propaganda to school education, from commercial advertisements to casual family chats, "positive energy" was everywhere.

On August 10, 2013, the "Internet Celebrity Social Responsibility Forum" hosted by Lu Wei, in Beijing invited Pan Shiyi, Charles Xue and other internet celebrities to participate. It was broadcast as a China Central Television program on August 18. The People's Daily published a press release on the forum. News websites and traditional media were required to publish the press release entitled "Internet Celebrities Consensus on Upholding the Seven Bottom Lines" in a prominent position. The press release mentioned the word "positive energy":

Everyone agreed that online celebrities should shoulder more social responsibility and spread positive energy. A consensus was reached to jointly uphold seven bottom lines: first, the bottom line of laws and regulations; second, the bottom line of the socialist system; third, the bottom line of national interests; fourth, the bottom line of citizens' legitimate rights and interests; fifth, the bottom line of social public order; sixth, the bottom line of moral standards; and seventh, the bottom line of information authenticity.

On August 14, 2013, the Capital Internet Association issued an initiative that all industries and netizens should adhere to theSeven Bottom Lines, gather the Chinese Dream online, actively spread positive energy, "guide the whole society to strive for the great rejuvenation of the Chinese nation", and "build the Internet into a new front for spreading advanced socialist culture".

On October 15, 2014, CCP general Secretary Xi Jinping convened a symposium on literary and artistic work in Beijing. Among the attendees were authoritative figures from the literary, film and television, and folk art circles, as well as two young online writers who were specifically named by Xi Jinping: Zhou Xiaoping and Hua Qianfang. Xi Jinping encouraged the two to write more works with positive energy. Liao Hong, president of People's Daily Online, pointed out that "the Internet is not only a pressure relief valve to resolve public grievances, but should also become a ballast stone for the national mentality, discover the truth, goodness and beauty in the grassroots, revitalize integrity, and transmit positive energy."

Chinese internet censors typically remove content, such as discussions of "lying flat" or major disasters, not deemed to promote positive energy.

== See also ==
- Censorship in China
- Positive mental attitude
- Self-revolution
