= Two Integrations =

Chinese Communist Party slogan

The Two Integrations (Chinese: 两个结合; pinyin: Liǎng gè jiéhé) is a Chinese Communist Party (CCP) political slogan that refers to integrating Marxism with China's specific conditions and China's traditional culture. The CCP's theoretical journal Qiushi describes it as "integrating the basic principles of Marxism with China's specific reality and with China's excellent traditional culture".

== History ==
The term was first coined in July 2021 at the speech commemorating the 100th Anniversary of the Chinese Communist Party. It was mentioned at the Resolution on the Major Achievements and Historical Experience of the Party over the Past Century adopted in November 2021. At a symposium on cultural heritage development on 2 June 2023, CCP General Secretary Xi Jinping stressed the importance of "combining Marxist theory with China's outstanding traditional culture". Xi said this combination was necessary to realize "modern Chinese civilization".

== See also ==
- Sinicization of Marxism
- Two Creates
