= Both red and expert =

Political term from Mao-era China

- Traditional Chinese: 又紅又專
- Simplified Chinese: 又红又专
- Literal meaning: "Both red and expert"
Transcriptions
Standard Mandarin
- Hanyu Pinyin: Yòu hóng yòu zhuān

Both red and expert, also translated as both socialist-minded and professionally competent or red and expert, is a Chinese phrase that originated in Mao-era China. "Red" refers to having a Marxist worldview and political stance, while "expert" refers to having professional knowledge and skills. The phrase represents the unity of political work and professional, technical work.

The opposite of a "red expert" is a "white expert" (simplified Chinese: 白专; traditional Chinese: 白專; pinyin: bái zhuān), referring to someone with professional, technical skills who has political views aligned with the bourgeoisie, placing them in opposition to the people.

Derivative terms exist, such as "advancing in both socialism and professional competence" (Chinese: 红专并进; pinyin: hóng zhuān bìngjìn; lit. 'red and expert advancing together').

== History ==
The phrase was first coined during the Third Plenary Session of the 8th Central Committee of the Chinese Communist Party in 1957, where the Great Leap Forward was first outlined. On November 6, 1957, Liu Shaoqi used the phrase in a speech entitled "On the Significance of the October Revolution", where he called for the working class to develop both the correct socialist stance and professional expertise. It was used by Mao Zedong in his "Sixty Points on Working Methods" document, published February 2, 1958: "It is beyond any doubt that politics and economy, politics and technology must be unified. This must be so and will for ever be so. This is the meaning of 'both red and expert'." CCP leaders emphasized that the "red" half meant loyalty to the party and the working class. "Red and expert universities" were established in some communes beginning in 1958, where peasants could develop technical and political skills.

The phrase was used in the "Sixty Articles on Higher Education" (Chinese: 高教六十条; pinyin: gāojiào liùshí tiáo) draft document, issued by the CCP Central Committee in September 1961.

The slogan was increasingly applied to the cultural sphere in the early 1960s. In the cultural context, this slogan criticized the idea of "artistic genius" as a bourgeois trick to deny the artistic abilities of ordinary people.

Deng Xiaoping used the phrase at the National Science Conference in 1978, proposing that the scientific workforce should become "both red and expert".

Chen Baosheng, Minister of Education, spoke about the need to cultivate "both red and expert" university graduates in a 2017 speech. The use of the phrase received notice online, attracting attention from some Chinese netizens who pointed out the phrase's association with the Cultural Revolution and criticized its use. The Diplomat, a United States magazine about Asian affairs, argued that use of the phrase was tied to a government push to encourage loyalty to the Communist Party. The Diplomat suggested it could also indicate a shift towards Mao-era policy, a notion disputed in an article by Lin Aiyue on the Chinese website Chawang, which argued that "red" solely meant patriotism and loyalty to one's people.

== Analysis ==
The term has been connected to socialist realism in Mao-era Chinese art, which emphasized "red" socialist messaging along with realistic depictions of "expert" productive development and the lives of skilled workers. According to Liu Je-Hung of National Taiwan Normal University, Mao's difficulty in balancing being "red" and being "expert" among party cadres led him to increasingly value generalized over specialized knowledge. The eventual result was that being "red" within the party was valued over being "expert", leading to a lack of specialized expertise within leadership that caused the failure of the Great Leap Forward.

Western scholars have analyzed the phrase as a symbol of conflicting interest groups in the People's Republic of China. "Red" versus "expert" is a common framework for analyzing the government of the People's Republic of China, in both the Mao era and the present, and is used as a shorthand for ideological versus technocratic rule. Sinologist Martin Bernal, writing in 1966 about the Cultural Revolution, argued that conflict between "experts" and "reds" was the principle contradiction in China at the time:

...in order to function efficiently and receive the rewards they feel they deserve, “experts” want rationality and hierarchy. The “reds” are veterans of the Revolutionary war or active, poor peasants whose skills are fighting, agitation, and mobilizing people. Believing that they can rely on the spontaneity of “the masses,” the “reds” aim for passion, struggle, and equality—at least outside the Party—so as to liberate popular energy. In 1957 they led the attacks on bureaucratic privileges, misuse of official cars, special education facilities for children, and so on. It is the “red” element in Party and government that for the past nine years has insisted that all office workers should go for periods of days, months, or even years to the factories and villages to do manual labor.

After Mao, Deng Xiaoping de-emphasized the importance of being "red" over being "expert", instead giving equal weight to both.

In the modern People's Republic of China, the term is associated with loyalty to the Communist Party and the government. On Chinese leftist websites, it is also associated with the promotion of grassroots knowledge and its integration with top-down institutional knowledge. Historian Sigrid Schmalzer argued that when used in this second sense, the intent is to encourage intellectuals to understand and communicate with the working class their research is meant to aid, and that "the 'participatory action research' approach adopted from the West was itself shaped by Maoist theories of knowledge."
