= Intangible Cultural Heritage of Finland =

Ratified in Finland in May 2013

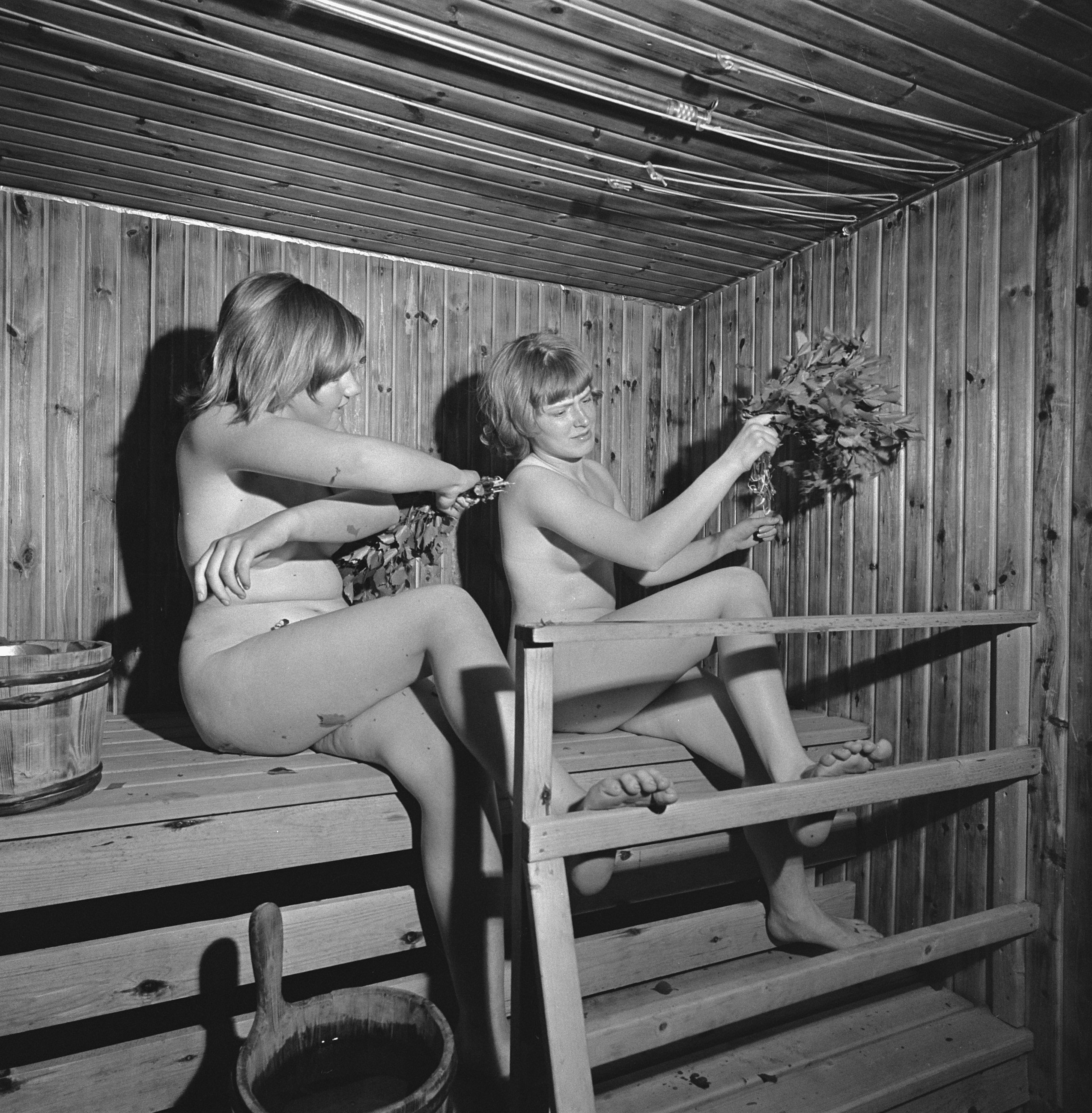
The Finnish sauna is an Intangible Cultural Heritage of Finland

The Convention for the Safeguarding of the Intangible Cultural Heritage was ratified in Finland in May 2013. The Finnish Ministry of Education and Culture has assigned the responsibility for implementing the convention to the National Board of Antiquities which is currently drafting a model for its execution in Finland.

The Finnish Foundation for Cultural Policy Research (CUPORE) is collaborating in this work in the context of research. Based on the conducted research and hearing of stakeholder groups, the National Board of Antiquities will draft a proposal in May 2015 for the Finnish Ministry of Education and Culture on how the convention will be realized in practice in Finland.

A comparative study "Intangible Cultural Heritage. Examples of the implementation of the UNESCO 2003 Convention in selected countries under comparison" was published by CUPORE in October 2014. The aim of the study is to provide background information on how the convention has been implemented in 15 countries. Another objective is to find interesting examples of the elements inscribed on the intangible cultural heritage lists, with the purpose of creating a roadmap for a Finnish model for implementing the convention and fostering intangible cultural heritage more generally as well.

== See also ==
- List of Intangible Cultural Heritage elements in Northern Europe
