= Yan'an Forum =

1942 forum on revolutionary cultural production

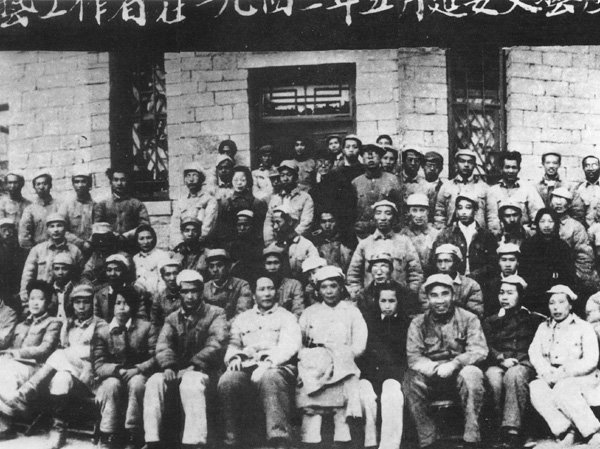
Chairman Mao Zedong and others at the Yan'an Forum on Literature and Art including Chen Xuezhao (5th from the left in the third row)

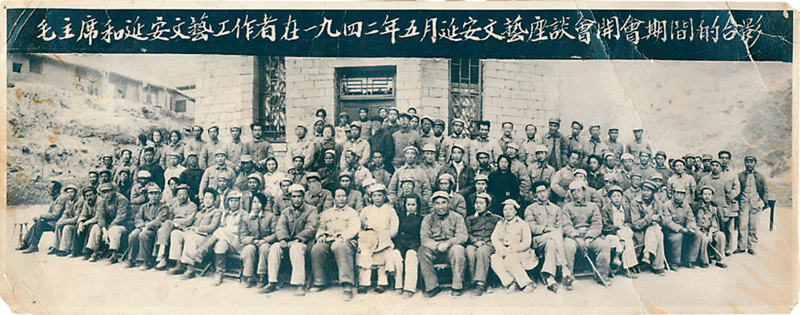
Group photo of representatives of the Yan'an Forum

The Yan'an Forum on Literature and Art (simplified Chinese: 延安文艺座谈会; traditional Chinese: 延安文藝座談會; pinyin: Yán'ān Wén Yì Zuòtánhuì) was a May 1942 forum held in the Yan'an Soviet and a significant event in the Chinese Communist Party's Yan'an Rectification Movement. It is most notable for the speeches given by Mao Zedong, later edited and published as Talks at the Yan'an Forum on Literature and Art (Chinese: 在延安文艺座谈会上的讲话; pinyin: Zài Yán'ān Wén Yì Zuòtánhuì shàng de Jiǎnghuà) which dealt with the role of literature and art in the country. The two main points were that (1) all art should reflect the life of the working class and consider them as an audience, and (2) that art should serve politics, and specifically the advancement of socialism.

== Background ==
Previous 20th century cultural movements in mainland China, such as the New Culture Movement, presumed a hierarchical relation between intellectuals and the masses. In the perspective of Mao Zedong and those who agreed with his cultural views, intellectuals' choice of literary forms, language, and separate relationship from the masses meant that they were unable to achieve more than a politics of representation.

Because it sought to mobilise mostly illiterate rural people, the Communist Party traditionally favored oral and visual art forms. During the Long March (1934–1935), the Chinese Communist Party (CCP) and its People's Liberation Army (PLA) used song, drama, and dance to appeal to the civilian population, but did not have a unified cultural policy. For three years after the outbreak of the Second Sino-Japanese War in 1937, the main message of the CCP art organizations, such as the Chinese People's Anti-Japanese Drama Society, was to "oppose Japan" (反日, fǎnrì) or "resist Japan" (抗日, kàngrì). In 1938, the CCP established the Lu Xun Academy of Fine Arts in Yan'an (Yenan), which was to train people in literature, music, fine arts, and drama.

In 1940, Mao issued a policy statement in his text, On New Democracy: "The content of China's new culture at the present stage is... the anti-imperialist anti-feudal new democracy of the popular masses led by the culture and thought of the proletariat".

After the New Fourth Army Incident, Nationalist forces and CCP forces fought each other in central China. The Nationalists blockaded Yan'an, leading to economic difficulties including inflation, reduced access to daily necessities, and increased taxes. Along with the Mass Production Movement, the Yan'an Rectification Movement (1942–1944) was one of the responses to the situation. During the Rectification Movement, The CCP used various methods to consolidate ideological unity among its cadres around Maoism (as opposed to Soviet-style Marxism–Leninism). The immediate spur to the Yan'an talks was a request by a concerned writer for Mao Zedong to clarify the ambiguous role of intellectuals in the CCP. Thus began a three-week conference at the Lu Xun Academy about the objectives of and methods of creating CCP art.

In April 1942, Mao announced that the Yan'an Forum on Literature and Art would convene the next month. Following this announcement, he met with various writers in the base area individually to discuss their views.

Mao delivered the Yan'an Talks in May 1942. The "Talks" consists of Mao's speech at the 2 May opening session and the 23 May closing session of the Yan'an Forum.

== Content ==
The Yan'an Talks outlined the CCP's policy on "mass culture" (Chinese: 群众文化; pinyin: qúnzhòng wénhuà) in China, which was to be "revolutionary culture" (Chinese: 革命文化; pinyin: gémìng wénhuà). The core concept of the Yan'an Talks was that art should translate the ideas of the Chinese Communist Revolution for rural peasants. This was an effort to reconfigure the social relationship in China between those who worked with their hands and those who wrote. In this view, cultural workers and the masses would both serve as teacher and student for each other. This revolutionary style of art would portray the lives of peasants and be directed towards them as an audience.

Mao scolded artists for neglecting "The cadres, party workers of all types, fighters in the army, workers in the factories and peasants in the villages" as audiences, just because they were illiterate. He was particularly critical of Chinese opera as a courtly art form, rather than one directed towards the masses. However, he encouraged artists to draw from China's artistic legacy as well as international art forms in order to further socialism. This view emphasized developing "national" forms of art and rejecting cosmopolitan or international approaches.

Mao discussed the relationship between "dissemination" and "raising standards". Mao emphasized the need to disseminate knowledge and art widely to the people and that this was consistent, not at tension with, the raising of standards. Academics Christine I. Ho and Sigrid Schmalzer write that this approach inverted conventional intellectual hierarchies, "prioritizing the needs of the laboring classes over those of intellectuals and valuing popular education over ivory-tower research while still recognizing the importance of 'standards' that imply a role for experts.

In the Yan'an Talks, Mao argued that it was important for art to depict allies and enemies clearly, urging artists to expose the cruelty of enemies and the inevitability of their defeat. Artists were also instructed to extol "the masses of the people, their toil and their struggle, their army and their Party."

Mao stated that transformations in the social relations of production required development of a new societal consciousness. Mao stated that in addition to reorganizing production, a revolution should create a culture in which the interests and needs of a working culture take priority. In this view, socialist literature should not merely reflect existing culture, but should help culturally produce the consciousness of a new society. In particular, cultural work should be viewed as a transformative experience which would built revolutionary relationships among cultural workers, the masses, and the CCP. According to Mao, "[T]hrough the creative labor of revolutionary writers and artists, the raw materials found in the life of the people are shaped into the ideological form of literature and art serving the masses of the people".

In Mao's view, artists and writers had to "enter deeply into the actual struggle" and "move over to the side of workers, peasants, and soldiers." Mao also encouraged literary people to transform themselves by living in the countryside, and to study the popular music and folk culture of the areas, incorporating both into their works. Mao stated, "rich deposits of literature and art actually exist in popular life itself: they are things in their natural forms, crude but also extremely lively, rich and fundamental: they made all processed forms of literature pale in comparison, they are the sole and inexhaustible source of processed forms of literature and art."

Mao articulated five independent although related categories of creative consideration for cultural production: (1) class stand, (2) attitude, (3) audience, (4) work style, and (5) popularization/massification. Mao expressed that there are no absolute criteria for evaluating art, only contextual and pragmatic considerations. In this view, there is no such thing as art-for-art's-sake.

== Legacy ==
The Talks became the most important guiding document of the Yan'an Rectification Movement. Throughout the rest of 1942, the content of the Talks and texts arising from the Rectification movement became a focus. After the formal publication of the Talks in October 1943, the CCP Central Committee issued two circulars stating that all CCP members should study the Talks, stating that they were the Sinicization of Marxism and Leninism. Mao followed the Talks with his report The Culture Workers Must Amalgamate with the Workers, Peasants, and Soldiers, in which he wrote, "Writers and artists must draw their materials from the workers, soldiers, and peasants, but so too must they become friends with the workers, soldiers, and peasants, they must be like brothers and sisters."

Implementing the principles of the Yan'an Talks involved the creation of new literary forms and content tailored to the socialist transformation of China and its culture, an endeavor that was much more complex than applying ideological standards to measure existing artistic forms. As summarized by academic Cai Xiang, the great writers of the period embraced this endeavor, while the practice was essentially inaccessible to hacks. In March 1943, the CCP Central Committee and the Central Organization Department held a conference and announced that more cultural workers would be sent to villages in the countryside.

The principles from the Yan'an Talks developed into the mass line in the context of arts and science.

An immediate change in Chinese music that resulted from the Yan'an Talks was the growth in respectability of folk styles. The Yan'an Talks also provided political legitimacy to traditional Chinese novel forms such as episodic chapters.

Key quotations from Yan'an Talks form the basis of the section on "Culture and Art" in the Maoist text Quotations from Chairman Mao Zedong. The Gang of Four's dramatic interpretation of the Yan'an Talks during the Cultural Revolution led to a new CCP-sanctioned form of political art, revolutionary opera. Conversely, certain forms of art, such as the works of Beethoven, Respighi, Dvorak, and Chopin, were condemned in CCP papers as "bourgeois decadence".

Seeking emulate the Yan'an Talks, Jiang Qing organized an arts forum with the People's Liberation Army in 1966. This was the Military Arts & Literature Work Conference, which she planned in conjunction with Lin Biao. The group gathered at the forum contended that cultural workers should be totally reorganised. A summary of Jiang's analysis at the forum was later distributed widely during the Cultural Revolution and became a significant document.

Academic Cai Xiang writes that over time, the important principles of the Yan'an Talks became increasingly simplified, ultimately resulting in the dogmatizing of the requirements for literature during the Cultural Revolution, which undermined the radicalism of China's socialist literature. After the death of Mao and the rise of reformist leaders like Deng Xiaoping, who condemned the Cultural Revolution, the Yan'an talks were officially reevaluated. In 1982, the CCP declared that Mao's doctrine that "literature and art are subordinate to politics" was an "incorrect formulation", but it reaffirmed his main points about art needing to reflect the reality of the workers and peasantry.

=== 21st century ===
For the 70th anniversary of the Yan'an Talks in May 2012, a group of 100 Chinese writers and artists including Mo Yan participated in hand-copying the text of the Yan'an Talks as a celebration.

On 15 October 2014, General Secretary XI Jinping emulated the Yan'an Talks with his Speech at the Forum on Literature and Art. Consistent with Mao's view in the Yan'an Talks, Xi believes works of art should be judged by political criteria. In 2021, Xi quoted the Yan'an Talks during the opening ceremony of the Eleventh National Congress of the Federation of Literature and Art and the Tenth National Congress of the Chinese Writers Association.

== See also ==
- Cultural policy of China
- Socialist realism
- Red Detachment of Women
