= Xi Jinping Thought on Culture =

Ideological policies of China

Xi Jinping Thought on Culture (Chinese: 习近平文化思想) is the current cultural, ideological, and propaganda doctrine of the Chinese Communist Party. It is a part of the larger Xi Jinping Thought, which is derived from the speeches of general secretary of the Chinese Communist Party Xi Jinping. It was established during the National Conference on Publicity, Ideology and Cultural Work, held in October 2023.

== History ==
The Xi Jinping Thought on Culture was put forward during the National Conference on Publicity, Ideology and Cultural Work, held between 7–8 October 2023. According to Xinhua News Agency, the "new ideas and judgments about cultural development in the new era put forward by Xi have enriched and developed Marxist cultural theories", forming the Xi Jinping Thought on Culture. CCP Politburo Standing Committee member Cai Qi, who chaired the meeting, read an instruction from Xi, which called on cultural, ideological, and propaganda work to focus on the "primary political task of arming the whole party and educating the people with the party's innovative theories".

== Content ==
According to the People's Daily, there are eleven major points for Xi Jinping Thought on Culture:

- Adhering to the Party's cultural leadership.
- Promoting the coordinated development of material and spiritual civilizations.
- Adhering to the "two integrations".
- Undertaking new cultural missions.
- Strengthening cultural confidence.
- Cultivating and practicing the core socialist values.
- Mastering the leading power of public opinion under the conditions of informatization, and widely constructing a social consensus.
- Adhering to the people-centered work orientation.
- Protecting historical and cultural heritage.
- Building a Chinese discourse and narrative system.
- Promoting exchanges and mutual learning among civilizations.

The People's Daily also outlined 16 aspects, which it said were the "main connotation of this important thought at the 'utilization' level".

== See also ==
- Beijing Forum on Literature and Art
