= Politics of Liaoning =

Politics of a province of China

The politics of Liaoning Province in the People's Republic of China is structured in a single party-government system like all other governing institutions in mainland China.

The Governor of Liaoning (辽宁省省长) is the highest-ranking official in the People's Government of Liaoning. However, in the province's single party-government governing system, the Governor has less power than the Liaoning Chinese Communist Party (CCP) Provincial Committee Secretary (辽宁省委书记), colloquially termed the "Liaoning CCP Party Chief".

Previous to 1949 and the takeover of the Communist forces, Liaoning was governed by the Fengtian Clique of warlords and interchangeably officials of the Chiang Kai-shek bureaucracy. During the Qing dynasty Liaoning was known as the province of Fengtian, and was governed by a zongdu or Viceroy (The Viceroy of the Three Eastern Provinces 东三省总督), along with the provinces of Jilin and Heilongjiang. The province itself also had a governor (xunfu).

== List of CCP Committee Secretaries ==
Image	Name (English)	Name (Chinese)	Term start	Term end	Ref.
	Huang Oudong	黄欧东	1 August 1954	September 1959	
	Huang Huoqing	黄火青	September 1959		
	Chen Xilian	陈锡联	January 1971	December 1973	
	Zeng Shaoshan	曾绍山	September 1975	September 1978	
	Ren Zhongyi	任仲夷	September 1978	November 1980	
	Guo Feng	郭峰	November 1980	June 1985	
	Li Guixian	李贵鲜	June 1985	April 1986	
	Quan Shuren	全树仁	April 1986	October 1993	
	Gu Jinchi	顾金池	October 1993	August 1997	
	Wen Shizhen	闻世震	August 1997	13 December 2004	
	Li Keqiang	李克强	13 December 2004	29 October 2007	
	Zhang Wenyue	张文岳	29 October 2007	30 October 2009	
	Wang Min	王珉	30 October 2009	4 May 2015	
	Li Xi	李希	4 May 2015	28 October 2017	
	Chen Qiufa	陈求发	28 October 2017	1 September 2020	
	Zhang Guoqing	张国清	1 September 2020	28 November 2022	
	Hao Peng	郝鹏	28 November 2022	30 September 2025	
	Xu Kunlin	许昆林	30 September 2025	Incumbent	

== List of governors ==
Governor	Chinese name	Term	Notes
Du Zheheng	杜者蘅	August 1954 – October 1958	
Huang Oudong	黄欧东	October 1958 – January 1967	
Chen Xilian	陈锡联	May 1968 – December 1973	Politically disgraced after the Cultural Revolution
Zeng Shaoshan	曾绍山	September 1975 – September 1978	
Ren Zhongyi	任仲夷	September 1978 – January 1979	
Chen Puru	陈璞如	January 1980 – April 1982	
Quan Shuren	全树仁	April 1983 – July 1986	
Li Changchun	李长春	July 1986 – July 1990	Politburo Standing Committee (2002 – 2012)
Yue Qifeng	岳歧峰	July 1990 – May 1994	
Wen Shizhen	闻世震	May 1994 – January 1998	
Zhang Guoguang	张国光	January 1998 – January 2001	
Bo Xilai	薄熙来	January 2001 – February 2004	Later Minister of Commerce, Party Secretary of Chongqing; Politburo (2007 – 2012); Charged and convicted of bribery and abuse of power in 2013, jailed.
Zhang Wenyue	张文岳	February 2004 – December 2007	Promoted to party chief
Chen Zhenggao	陈政高	December 2007 – May 2014	Later Minister of Housing and Urban-Rural Development
Li Xi	李希	May 2014 – May 2015	Promoted to party chief
Chen Qiufa	陈求发	May 2015 – October 2017	Promoted to party chief
Tang Yijun	唐一军	October 2017 – April 2020	
Liu Ning	刘宁	April 2020 – October 2021	
Li Lecheng	李乐成	October 2021 – February 2025	Promoted to Minister of Industry and Information Technology
Wang Xinwei	王新伟	February 2025 – present	Acting governor and deputy governor

== List of chairmen of Liaoning People's Congress ==
1. Huang Oudong (黄欧东): 1980–1983
2. Zhang Zhengde (张正德): 1983–1988
3. Wang Guangzhong (王光中): 1988–1993
4. Quan Shuren (全树仁):1993–1998
5. Wang Huaiyuan (王怀远): 1998–2003
6. Wen Shizhen (闻世震): 2003–2005
7. Li Keqiang (李克强): 2005–2007
8. Zhang Xilin (张锡林): 2007–2010
9. Wang Min (王珉): 2010–2015
10. Li Xi (李希): 2015– 2018
11. Chen Qiufa (陈求发): 2018–2021
12. Zhang Guoqing (张国清): 2021–present

== List of chairmen of Liaoning CPPCC ==
1. Huang Oudong (黄欧东): 1955–1959
2. Huang Huoqing: 1959–1967
3. Huang Oudong (黄欧东): 1977–1980
4. Li Huang (李荒): 1980–1982
5. Song Li (宋黎): 1982–1985
6. Xu Shaofu (徐少甫): 1985–1993
7. Sun Qi (孙奇): 1993–2001
8. Xiao Zuofu (肖作福): 2001–2003
9. Zhang Wenyue (张文岳): 2003–2004
10. Guo Tingbiao (郭廷标): 2004–2008
11. Luo Lin (骆琳): 2008
12. Yue Fuhong (岳福洪): 2009–2013
13. Xia Deren: 2013– 2021
14. Zhou Bo: 2021–present

== See also ==
- Politics of the People's Republic of China
