= Liaoning Provincial People's Government =

Liaoning Provincial People's Government 辽宁省人民政府
- Established: June 1954; 71 years ago

Leadership
- Governor: Wang Xinwei; 1 March 2025
- Parent body: Central People's Government; Liaoning Provincial People's Congress
- Elected by: Liaoning Provincial People's Congress

Website
- www.ln.gov.cn

The Liaoning Provincial People's Government is the local administrative agency of Liaoning. It is officially elected by the Liaoning Provincial People's Congress and is formally responsible to the Liaoning Provincial People's Congress and its Standing Committee. Under the country's one-party system, the governor is subordinate to the secretary of the Liaoning Provincial Committee of the Chinese Communist Party. The Provincial government is headed by a governor, currently Wang Xinwei.

== History ==
In June 1954, according to the decision of the 32nd meeting of the Central People's Government Committee, it was established by merging the former Liaodong Provincial People's Government, Liaoxi Provincial People's Government and the Dalian People's Administrative Office. In 1955, it was reorganized into the Liaoning Provincial People's Committee. In 1968, the Liaoning Provincial Revolutionary Committee was established. In January 1980, the Liaoning Provincial Revolutionary Committee was abolished and the Liaoning Provincial People's Government was re-established.

== Organization ==
The organization of the Liaoning Provincial People's Government includes:

- General Office of the Liaoning Provincial People's Government

=== Component Departments ===
- Liaoning Provincial Development and Reform Commission
- Liaoning Provincial Department of Education
- Liaoning Provincial Department of Science and Technology
- Liaoning Provincial Department of Industry and Information Technology
- Liaoning Provincial Ethnic and Religious Affairs Committee
- Liaoning Provincial Public Security Department
- Liaoning Provincial Civil Affairs Department
- Liaoning Provincial Department of Justice
- Liaoning Provincial Department of Finance
- Liaoning Provincial Department of Human Resources and Social Security
- Liaoning Provincial Department of Natural Resources
- Liaoning Provincial Department of Ecology and Environment
- Liaoning Provincial Department of Housing and Urban-Rural Development
- Liaoning Provincial Department of Transportation
- Liaoning Provincial Water Resources Department
- Liaoning Provincial Department of Agriculture and Rural Affairs
- Liaoning Provincial Department of Commerce
- Liaoning Provincial Department of Culture and Tourism
- Liaoning Provincial Health Commission
- Liaoning Provincial Department of Veterans Affairs
- Liaoning Provincial Emergency Management Department
- Liaoning Provincial Audit Office
- Foreign Affairs Office of Liaoning Provincial People's Government

=== Directly affiliated special institution ===
- State-owned Assets Supervision and Administration Commission of Liaoning Provincial People's Government

=== Organizations under the government ===
- Liaoning Provincial Market Supervision Administration
- Liaoning Provincial Radio and Television Bureau
- Liaoning Provincial Sports Bureau
- Liaoning Provincial Bureau of Statistics
- Liaoning Provincial People's Government Research Office
- Liaoning Provincial National Defense Mobilization Office
- Liaoning Provincial Business Environment Construction Bureau
- Liaoning Provincial Medical Insurance Bureau
- Liaoning Provincial Rural Revitalization Bureau
- Liaoning Provincial Government Affairs Bureau

=== Departmental management organization ===
- The Liaoning Provincial Bureau of Grain and Material Reserves is managed by the Provincial Development and Reform Commission.
- The Liaoning Provincial Prison Administration Bureau is managed by the Provincial Department of Justice.
- Liaoning Provincial Forestry and Grassland Bureau is managed by the Provincial Department of Natural Resources.
- The Liaoning Provincial Local Coal Mine Safety Supervision Bureau is managed by the Provincial Emergency Management Department.
- The Liaoning Provincial Drug Administration is managed by the Provincial Market Supervision Administration.
- The Liaoning Provincial Intellectual Property Office is managed by the Provincial Market Supervision Administration.

=== Directly affiliated institutions ===
- Liaoning Academy of Agriculture and Forestry Sciences
- Liaoning Provincial Information Center
- Liaoning Inspection, Testing and Certification Center
- Liaoning Provincial Public Resources Trading Center
- Liaoning Academy of Social Sciences
- Liaoning Provincial Supply and Marketing Cooperatives Federation
- Liaoning Province Advanced Equipment Manufacturing Base Construction Engineering Center
- Liaoning Province Major Technology Equipment Strategic Base Construction Engineering Center
- Liaoning National New Raw Materials Base Construction Engineering Center
- Liaoning Province Modern Agricultural Production Base Construction Engineering Center
- Liaoning Province Important Technology Innovation and R&D Base Construction Engineering Center

== See also ==
- Politics of Liaoning
  - Liaoning Provincial People's Congress
  - Liaoning Provincial People's Government
    - Governor of Liaoning
  - Liaoning Provincial Committee of the Chinese Communist Party
    - Party Secretary of Liaoning
  - Liaoning Provincial Committee of the Chinese People's Political Consultative Conference
