= Governor of Liaoning =

Governor of the Liaoning Provincial People's Government
- 辽宁省人民政府省长
- National Emblem of China

- Flag of China
- Incumbent; Wang Xinwei since 1 March 2025
- Liaoning Provincial People's Government
- Type: Governor
- Status: Provincial and ministerial-level official
- Reports to: Liaoning Provincial People's Congress and its Standing Committee
- Nominator: Presidium of the Liaoning Provincial People's Congress
- Appointer: Liaoning Provincial People's Congress
- Term length: Five years, renewable
- Inaugural holder: Du Zheheng
- Formation: August 1954
- Deputy: Deputy Governors; Secretary-General

The governor of Liaoning, officially the Governor of the Liaoning Provincial People's Government, is the head of Liaoning Province and leader of the Liaoning Provincial People's Government.

The governor is elected by the Liaoning Provincial People's Congress, and responsible to it and its Standing Committee. The governor is a provincial level official and is responsible for the overall decision-making of the provincial government. The governor is assisted by an executive vice governor as well as several vice governors. The governor generally serves as the deputy secretary of the Liaoning Provincial Committee of the Chinese Communist Party and as a member of the CCP Central Committee. The governor is the second highest-ranking official in the province after the secretary of the CCP Liaoning Committee. The current governor is Wang Xinwei, who took office on 1 March 2025.

== List of governors ==
=== People's Republic of China ===
No.	Officeholder	Term of office		Party	Ref.
No.	Officeholder	Took office	Left office	Party	Ref.
Governor of the Liaoning Provincial People's Government
1	Du Zheheng (1910–1975)	August 1954	February 1955	Chinese Communist Party	
Governor of the Liaoning Provincial People's Committee
(1)	Du Zheheng (1910–1975)	February 1955	December 1958	Chinese Communist Party	
2	Huang Oudong (1905–1993)	December 1958	May 1968	Chinese Communist Party	
Director of the Liaoning Revolutionary Committee
3	Chen Xilian (1915–1999)	May 1968	December 1973	Chinese Communist Party	
4	Zeng Shaoshan (1914–1995)	September 1975	September 1978	Chinese Communist Party	
5	Ren Zhongyi (1914–2005)	September 1978	January 1980	Chinese Communist Party	
Governor of the Liaoning Provincial People's Government
6	Chen Puru (1918–1998)	January 1980	April 1982	Chinese Communist Party	
7	Quan Shuren (1930–2008)	April 1982	July 1986	Chinese Communist Party	
8	Li Changchun (born 1944)	July 1986	July 1990	Chinese Communist Party	
9	Yue Qifeng (1931–2008)	July 1990	July 1990	Chinese Communist Party	
10	Wen Shizhen (1940–2021)	May 1994	January 1998	Chinese Communist Party	
11	Zhang Guoguang (born 1945)	January 1998	January 2001	Chinese Communist Party	
12	Bo Xilai (born 1949)	24 February 2001	17 February 2004	Chinese Communist Party	
13	Zhang Wenyue (born 1944)	17 February 2004	22 December 2007	Chinese Communist Party	
14	Chen Zhenggao (1952–2024)	22 December 2007	5 May 2014	Chinese Communist Party	
15	Li Xi (born 1953)	5 May 2014	4 May 2015	Chinese Communist Party	
16	Chen Qiufa (born 1954)	4 May 2015	30 October 2017	Chinese Communist Party	
17	Tang Yijun (born 1961)	30 October 2017	11 May 2020	Chinese Communist Party	
18	Liu Ning (born 1962)	1 July 2020	19 October 2021	Chinese Communist Party	
19	Li Lecheng (born 1965)	20 October 2021	1 March 2025	Chinese Communist Party	
20	Wang Xinwei (born 1967)	1 March 2025	Incumbent	Chinese Communist Party	
