= Quan Shuren =

Chinese politician (1930–2008)

- 全树仁

Party Secretary of Liaoning
- In office April 1986 – March 1993
- Preceded by: Li Guixian
- Succeeded by: Gu Jinchi

Chairman of Liaoning People's Congress
- In office March 1993 – January 1998
- Preceded by: Wang Guangzhong
- Succeeded by: Wang Huaiyuan

Governor of Liaoning
- In office March 1983 – April 1986
- Party Secretary: Li Guixian
- Preceded by: Chen Puru
- Succeeded by: Yan Haiwang

Personal details
- Born: 26 August 1930 Xinmin County, Liaoning, China
- Died: 1 December 2008 (aged 78) Shenyang, Liaoning, China
- Party: Chinese Communist Party

Chinese name
- Simplified Chinese: 全树仁
- Traditional Chinese: 全樹仁
Transcriptions
Standard Mandarin
- Hanyu Pinyin: Quán Shùrén

Quan Shuren (Chinese: 全树仁; 26 August 1930 – 1 December 2008) was a Chinese politician who served as governor of Liaoning from 1983 to 1986, party secretary of Liaoning from 1986 to 1993, and chairman of Liaoning People's Congress from 1993 to 1998.

He was an alternate member of the 12th Central Committee of the Chinese Communist Party and a member of the 13th and 14th Central Committee of the Chinese Communist Party. He was a representative of the 13th, 14th, and 15th National Congress of the Chinese Communist Party. He was a delegate to the 6th, 7th, and 8th National People's Congress. He was a member of the Standing Committee of the 9th Chinese People's Political Consultative Conference.

== Biography ==
Quan was born into a family of farming background in Xinmin County (now Xinmin), Liaoning, on 26 August 1930. He attended Harbin Nangang Primary School and Harbin Municipal No. 3 Middle School.

He joined the Northeast Democratic Youth League in 1946, and joined the Chinese Communist Party (CCP) in April 1949. Starting in 1948, he served in several posts in Fushun. In 1966, the Cultural Revolution broke out, he was brought to be persecuted and was sent to the May Seventh Cadre Schools to do farm works. He was reinstated in June 1969 and was despatched to the Fushun Steel Factory (now Fushun Special Steel). Since 1980, he successively served as deputy party secretary, mayor, and party secretary of Fushun. In October 1982, he was named acting head of the Organization Department of the CCP Liaoning Provincial Committee and was admitted to member of the Standing Committee of the CCP Liaoning Provincial Committee, the province's top authority. He served as governor of Liaoning from March 1983 to April 1986, and party secretary, the top political position in the province, from April 1986 to March 1993. During his tenure, he vigorously promoted the reform of the urban economic system and the work of streamlining administration and delegating power at the provincial level. At the same time, he also attached great importance to the work of "agriculture, rural areas and farmers", attached importance to the development of agriculture and rural areas and the improvement of farmers' income, and made positive contributions to the leap from shortage agriculture to self-supporting agriculture, and actively promoted the rural household contract responsibility system with output linked. He was chosen as chairman of Liaoning People's Congress in March 1993, and held that office until January 1998.

On 1 December 2008, he died from an illness in Shenyang, Liaoning, at the age of 78.

Government offices
Preceded by Chen Puru	Governor of Liaoning; 1983–1986	Succeeded by Yan Haiwang
Party political offices
Preceded by Li Guixian	Party Secretary of Liaoning; 1986–1993	Succeeded by Gu Jinchi
Assembly seats
Preceded by Wang Guangzhong	Chairman of Liaoning People's Congress; 1993–1998	Succeeded by Wang Huaiyuan
