= Party Secretary of Liaoning =

Provincial government position in China

Secretary of the Liaoning Provincial Committee of the Chinese Communist Party
- 中国共产党辽宁省委员会书记
- Emblem of the Chinese Communist Party

- Flag of the Chinese Communist Party

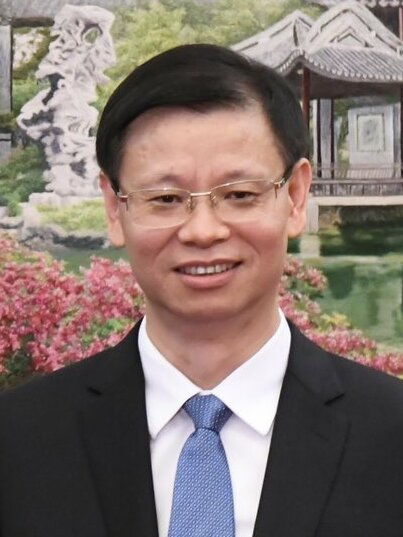
- Incumbent; Xu Kunlin since 30 September 2025
- Liaoning Provincial Committee of the Chinese Communist Party
- Type: Party Committee Secretary
- Status: Provincial and ministerial-level official
- Member of: Liaoning Provincial Standing Committee
- Nominator: Central Committee
- Appointer: Liaoning Provincial Committee; Central Committee
- Inaugural holder: Huang Oudong
- Formation: 1 August 1954
- Deputy: Deputy Secretary; Secretary-General

The secretary of the Liaoning Provincial Committee of the Chinese Communist Party is the leader of the Liaoning Provincial Committee of the Chinese Communist Party (CCP). As the CCP is the sole ruling party of the People's Republic of China (PRC), the secretary is the highest ranking post in Liaoning.

The secretary is officially appointed by the CCP Central Committee based on the recommendation of the CCP Organization Department, which is then approved by the Politburo and its Standing Committee. The secretary can be also appointed by a plenary meeting of the Liaoning Provincial Committee, but the candidate must be the same as the one approved by the central government. The secretary leads the Standing Committee of the Liaoning Provincial Committee, and is usually a member of the CCP Central Committee. The secretary leads the work of the Provincial Committee and its Standing Committee. The secretary is outranks the governor, who is generally the deputy secretary of the committee.

The current secretary is Xu Kunlin, who took office on 30 September 2025.

== List of party secretaries ==
Image	Name (English)	Name (Chinese)	Term start	Term end	Ref.
	Huang Oudong	黄欧东	1 August 1954	September 1959	
	Huang Huoqing	黄火青	September 1959		
	Chen Xilian	陈锡联	January 1971	December 1973	
	Zeng Shaoshan	曾绍山	September 1975	September 1978	
	Ren Zhongyi	任仲夷	September 1978	November 1980	
	Guo Feng	郭峰	November 1980	June 1985	
	Li Guixian	李贵鲜	June 1985	April 1986	
	Quan Shuren	全树仁	April 1986	October 1993	
	Gu Jinchi	顾金池	October 1993	August 1997	
	Wen Shizhen	闻世震	August 1997	13 December 2004	
	Li Keqiang	李克强	13 December 2004	29 October 2007	
	Zhang Wenyue	张文岳	29 October 2007	30 October 2009	
	Wang Min	王珉	30 October 2009	4 May 2015	
	Li Xi	李希	4 May 2015	28 October 2017	
	Chen Qiufa	陈求发	28 October 2017	1 September 2020	
	Zhang Guoqing	张国清	1 September 2020	28 November 2022	
	Hao Peng	郝鹏	28 November 2022	30 September 2025	
	Xu Kunlin	许昆林	30 September 2025	Incumbent	
