= Gu Jinchi =

Chinese politician

- 顾金池

Party Secretary of Liaoning
- In office September 1993 – August 1997
- Deputy: Yue Qifeng; Wen Shizhen (governor)
- Preceded by: Quan Shuren
- Succeeded by: Wen Shizhen

Party Secretary of Gansu
- In office October 1990 – September 1993
- Deputy: Jia Zhijie; Yan Haiwang (governor)
- Preceded by: Li Ziqi
- Succeeded by: Yan Haiwang

Personal details
- Born: February 1932 Xiong County, Hebei, China
- Died: 17 March 2009 (aged 77) Beijing, China
- Party: Chinese Communist Party

Chinese name
- Simplified Chinese: 顾金池
- Traditional Chinese: 顧金池
Transcriptions
Standard Mandarin
- Hanyu Pinyin: Gù Jīnchí

Gu Jinchi (Chinese: 顾金池; February 1932 – 17 March 2009) was a Chinese Communist politician who served as party secretary of Gansu from 1990 to 1993 and party secretary of Liaoning.

He was a member of the 13th and 14th Central Committee of the Chinese Communist Party. He was a representative of the 15th National Congress of the Chinese Communist Party. He was a delegate to the 8th National People's Congress and a member of the Standing Committee of the 9th National People's Congress.

== Biography ==
Gu was born in Xiong County, Hebei, in February 1932. He worked at Beijing Machinery Factory in 1947. He joined the Chinese Communist Party (CCP) in October 1949.

In 1952, he was assigned to the Beijing No. 1 Machine Tool Factory, he remained at the factory until 1965, when he was transferred to southwest China's Sichuan province and appointed party secretary of the newly founded Changzheng Machine Tool Plant (长征机床厂). In 1966, the Cultural Revolution broke out, he was sent to the May Seventh Cadre Schools to do farm works. He was removed from office but reinstated two years later. Gu got involved in politics in 1978, when he was appointed vice mayor and party secretary of Zigong. At the same time, he was admitted to member of the Standing Committee of the CCP Zigong Municipal Committee, the city's top authority. In 1982, he was promoted to become vice governor of Sichuan and was admitted to member of the Standing Committee of the CCP Sichuan Provincial Committee, the province's top authority. He was chosen as deputy party secretary of Sichuan in 1987.

In October 1990, he was promoted again to become party secretary of Gansu, succeeding Li Ziqi.

In September 1993, he was despatched to northeast China's Liaoning province and appointed party secretary, the top political position in the province.

In March 1998, he took office as vice chairperson of the National People's Congress Supervisory and Judicial Affairs Committee.

On 17 March 2009, he died from an illness in Beijing, at the age of 77.

Party political offices
Preceded by Li Ziqi	Party Secretary of Gansu; 1990–1993	Succeeded by Yan Haiwang
Preceded by Quan Shuren	Party Secretary of Liaoning; 1993–1997	Succeeded by Wen Shizhen
