= Li Xi =

Chinese politician (born 1956)

- 李希
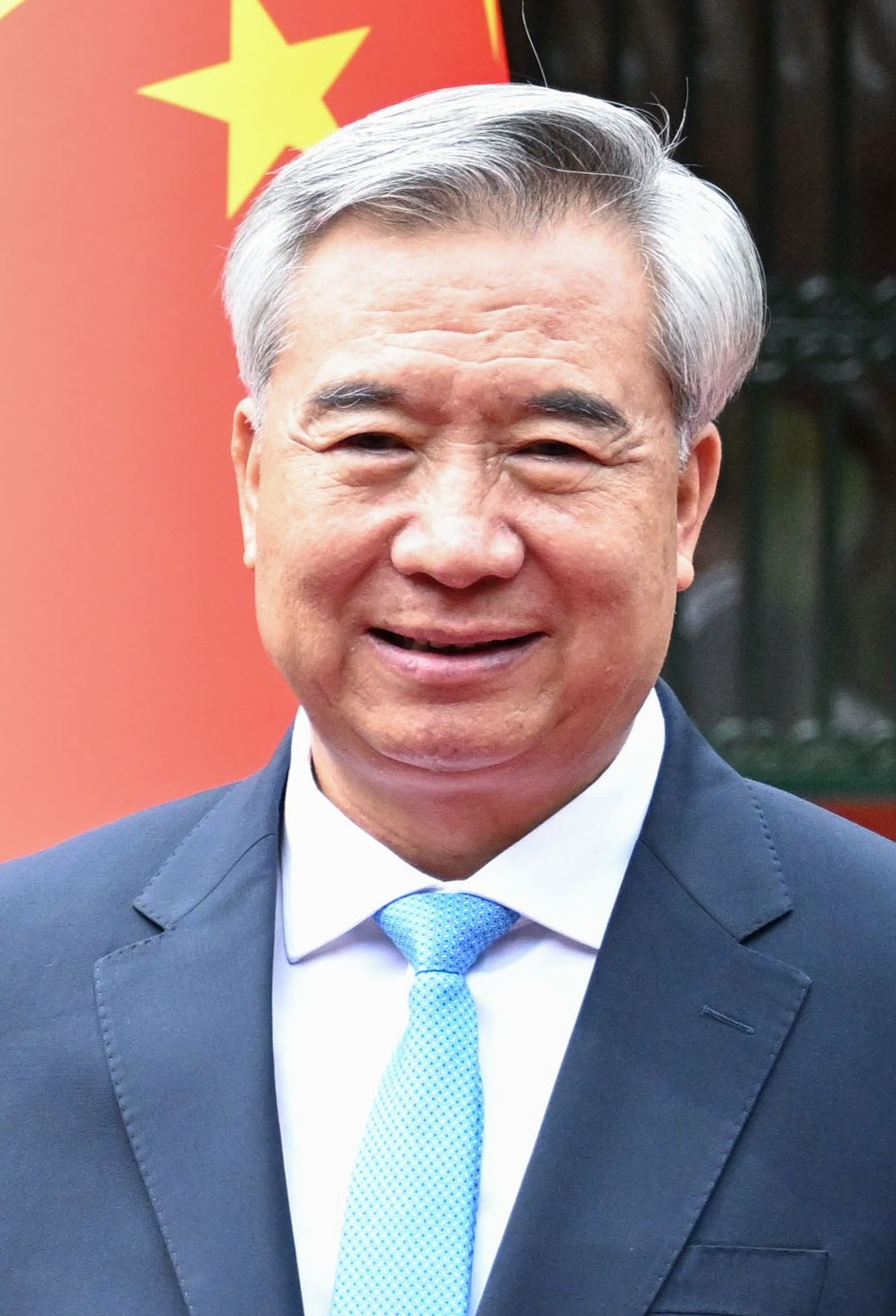
- Li in 2025

Secretary of the Central Commission for Discipline Inspection
- Incumbent
- Assumed office 23 October 2022
- Deputy: Liu Jinguo (First-ranked)
- General Secretary: Xi Jinping
- Preceded by: Zhao Leji

Party Secretary of Guangdong
- In office 28 October 2017 – 28 October 2022
- Deputy: Ma Xingrui (Governor); Wang Weizhong
- General Secretary: Xi Jinping
- Preceded by: Hu Chunhua
- Succeeded by: Huang Kunming

Party Secretary of Liaoning
- In office 4 May 2015 – 28 October 2017
- Deputy: Chen Qiufa (Governor)
- General Secretary: Xi Jinping
- Preceded by: Wang Min
- Succeeded by: Chen Qiufa

Governor of Liaoning
- In office 5 May 2014 – 8 May 2015; Acting: 5 May 2014 – 17 October 2014
- Party Secretary: Wang Min
- Preceded by: Chen Zhenggao
- Succeeded by: Chen Qiufa

Personal details
- Born: October 1956 (age 70) Liangdang County, Gansu, China
- Party: Chinese Communist Party
- Education: Northwest Normal University

Li Xi (Note: Chinese: 李希; pinyin: Lǐ Xī) (born October 1956) is a Chinese politician who is the current secretary of the Central Commission for Discipline Inspection, the highest supervisory organ of the Chinese Communist Party (CCP), and the seventh-ranking member of the Politburo Standing Committee of the Chinese Communist Party.

Li spent much of his career in northwestern China, and served as the party secretary of the revolutionary base of Yan'an. He then served as the deputy party secretary of Shanghai, then Governor of Liaoning, then promoted to party secretary. From 2017 to 2022, he was the party secretary of Guangdong province and a member of the 19th Politburo of the Chinese Communist Party.

== Early life ==
Li Xi was born on 16 October 1956 in Liangdang County, Gansu province. He was sent to the Yunping People's Commune in Liangdang County in 1975 as a "sent-down youth". He became a clerk at the Liangdang County Party Committee's Culture and Education Bureau in 1976, and enrolled as an undergraduate in Northwest Normal University to study Chinese language and literature. Li became a member of the Chinese Communist Party (CCP) in January 1982, and graduated from university later the same year.

== Political career ==
=== Gansu ===
Li started his career working as a mishu in the publicity department of the CCP Gansu Provincial Committee in 1982. In 1985, he became a mishu in the office of the Gansu Party Secretary Li Ziqi. Li began his tenure at the provincial organization department of Gansu in 1986 as an official, subsequently ascending to deputy division head in 1987 and division chief in 1990, remaining in that position until 1995. Li was designated as the Party Secretary of Xigu District in the provincial capital of Lanzhou in 1995, thereafter assuming the role of director of the provincial organization department in 1996. In 1999, he became the Deputy Party Secretary of Lanzhou, and was later appointed as the Party secretary of Zhangye prefecture in 2001. In 2004, during his tenure in Zhangye, Li attended a four-month mid-career training program offered by the Central Party School. In 2004, he served as the secretary-general of the Gansu Provincial Party Committee for a few months.

=== Shaanxi ===
In 2004, Li was transferred to Shaanxi, where he became the secretary-general of the CCP Shaanxi Provincial Committee and a member of the Provincial Standing Committee. In 2006, Li became the Party secretary of Yan'an, which had been the center of the Chinese Communist Revolution from the end of the Long March, in late 1935, until early 1947. In October 2017, he was elected as an alternate member of the 17th Central Committee of the Chinese Communist Party after the 17th National Congress of the Chinese Communist Party in Beijing. In 2008, he enrolled in the School of Economics and Management at Tsinghua University in Beijing, gaining a Master of Business Administration via part-time studies in 2011.

=== Shanghai ===
In May 2011, Li Xi was transferred to the Standing Committee of the Shanghai Municipal Committee of the Chinese Communist Party and Minister of the Organization Department. In April 2013, he was promoted to Deputy Secretary of the CCP Shanghai Municipal Committee. At the 18th CCP National Congress in 2012, he was re-elected as an alternate member to the 18th Central Committee.

=== Liaoning ===
On 5 May 2014, he was transferred again to Liaoning province in Northeast China, and was appointed Acting Governor and Deputy Party secretary of the province, replacing outgoing governor Chen Zhenggao. He was confirmed by the provincial legislature as governor later that year and served as governor until 8 May 2015. In May 2015, he succeeded Wang Min as Party Secretary of Liaoning, becoming the highest ranking official of the province.

=== Guangdong ===
At the 19th Party Congress, Li Xi was named a member of the Politburo of the Chinese Communist Party. On October 28, 2017, shortly after the party congress, Li was transferred to take over from Hu Chunhua as party secretary of the politically important southern province of Guangdong.

During his tenure, Li was highly visible in checking Guangdong's response to the COVID-19 pandemic. During a conference about promoting the Greater Bay Area in February 2022, Li urged cadres to give priority building Qianhai and Hengqin, two border areas which were selected as pilot testing zones in areas such as finance and technology. He also called for attracting global talent, and deepening cooperation with Hong Kong and Macau in infrastructure, technology, COVID-19, and people-to-people exchange between the cities. In response to heavy rains in southern China in May 2022, Li held a meeting urging officials to be vigilant in ensuring food supply and disaster aid.

=== Central Commission for Discipline Inspection ===
In October 2022, following the first plenary session of the 20th Central Committee of the Chinese Communist Party, Li was appointed to the 20th Politburo Standing Committee of the Chinese Communist Party. Li also succeeded Zhao Leji as Secretary of the Central Commission for Discipline Inspection. Li was succeeded by Huang Kunming as the Party Secretary of Guangdong.

In March 2023, the CCDI announced a round of self-inspection, which Li called an "important political task" to ensure its power is not abused. He called on cadres to "clean up, rectify and purify the organization" and take "most powerful measures and most decisive action". In the same month, the CCDI started an investigation campaign in the China Investment Corporation, the China Development Bank, the Agricultural Development Bank of China, the China Everbright Group and the People's Insurance Company of China, which Li said would solve outstanding issues in the financial industry. On 1 September 2023, Li gave a keynote address at the 11th National Congress of Returned Overseas Chinese and Their Relatives, where he called on overseas Chinese to "resolutely oppose" the independence of Taiwan and "promote reunification". He praised overseas Chinese for various contributions to China, called on them to join achieving the CCP's second centenary goals, and described them as a bridge between China and their countries of residence.

In October 2023, the Belt and Road Forum convened in Beijing, where Li Xi engaged with President Ruto of Kenya, Prime Minister Kakar of Pakistan, and President Khürelsükh of Mongolia and discussed joint anti-corruption efforts. In the same month, Li called on investigations to five departments: the Ministry of Science and Technology, the Ministry of Industry and Information Technology, the State-owned Assets Supervision and Administration Commission, the State Administration of Science, Technology and Industry for National Defense, and the State Tobacco Monopoly Administration – as well as 26 state-owned enterprises, and said the CCDI would strengthen supervision of department and SOE heads, as well as increase collaboration with audit, financial, statistics, petition and other departments. Li attended the Group of 77 summit in Havana, Cuba later in the month. During the summit, Li said that China wanted to work with developing countries to make global governance fairer, and that "certain countries" imposed unilateral sanctions that damaged the Global South. Li also visited Brazil and Egypt. In November 2023, he met with Central Inspection Commission of the Communist Party of Vietnam Chairman Trần Cẩm Tú and promised together to increase cooperation in anti-corruption.

Li delivered a work report of the CCDI in January 2024, which promised anti-corruption work both in China and overseas. It said the CCDI would target "unhealthy practices and corruption" in rural revitalization, ensure anti-corruption work within the Belt and Road Initiative, ensure political security, and "show no mercy to those who form political gangs, cliques and interest groups". Li visited Kenya in November 2024, where he met with Kenyan President William Ruto, who revealed there were advanced discussions on China financing the Rironi-Mau Summit road. In the same month, addressing anti-corruption checks in villages by the CCDI, Li called them necessary to remove "misconduct and corruption that occur on people's doorsteps". In July 2025, Li held a CCDI Standing Committee meeting, calling for a crackdown on fraud in scientific research funding. He said China must create a good environment for development, and that it must "resolutely crack down on corruption that abuses project management authority to accept bribes, or colludes to embezzle research funds".

On 24 February 2026, Cai Qi convened a meeting in Beijing with Li Xi to start a campaign to urge officials to correct any deviations from the "correct" line in their own duties and in assessments of their subordinates. In June 2026, he attended the National Conference on Party Building, where the Xi Jinping Thought on Party Building was created. Li was part of the drafting team led by Xi that drafted the resolution adopted in October 2026 by the fifth plenary session of the 20th Central Committee; the team began its work in February 2026. In November 2026, Li published a commentary in the People's Daily, where he called for further combating corruption and institutional oversight and cited the case of former Politburo members Ma Xingrui, Zhang Youxia and He Weidong as an example of the courage to "scrape poison from the bone and cut off a poisoned limb", while adding that the country's "path has contributed a Chinese solution to the international community’s challenges in combating corruption". In the same month, he also praised the Law on Countering Cross-Border Corruption, saying "legislation should be enacted to combat cross-border corruption, to strengthen efforts to track down fugitives, prevent flight and recover illicit assets, along with greater enforcement in cross-border corruption cases".

== Notes ==
Party political offices
Preceded by Zhao Leji	Secretary of the Central Commission for Discipline Inspection; 2022–present	Incumbent
Preceded by Hu Chunhua	Party Secretary of Guangdong; 2017–2022	Succeeded by Huang Kunming
Preceded by Wang Min	Party Secretary of Liaoning; 2015–2017	Succeeded by Chen Qiufa
Preceded by Yin Yicui	Deputy Party Secretary of Shanghai; 2013–2014	Succeeded by Ying Yong
Government offices
Preceded by Chen Zhenggao	Governor of Liaoning; 2014–2015	Succeeded by Chen Qiufa
Order of precedence
Preceded by Ding Xuexiang as Member of the Politburo Standing Committee of the Chinese Communist Party	Order of precedence of China as Member of the Politburo Standing Committee of the Chinese Communist Party	Succeeded by Han Zheng as Vice President
