= Li Ningping =

Chinese politician and business executive

- 李宁平

Chairman of Gansu Electric Power Investment Co., Ltd.
- In office November 2013 – November 2016
- Preceded by: Position established
- Succeeded by: Pu Peiwen

General Manager of Gansu Electric Power Investment Co., Ltd.
- In office October 2005 – November 2013
- Succeeded by: Ma Zixue (马自学)

Communist Party Secretary of Gansu Electric Power Investment Co., Ltd.
- In office December 1999 – November 2016

Mayor of Wuwei
- In office April 1989 – April 1992

Personal details
- Born: September 1951 (age 75) Shenmu, Shaanxi, China
- Party: Chinese Communist Party
- Parent: Li Ziqi
- Education: Gansu Traffic School; Gansu Provincial Party School
- Occupation: Politician, business executive

Chinese name
- Traditional Chinese: 李寧平
- Simplified Chinese: 李宁平
Transcriptions
Standard Mandarin
- Hanyu Pinyin: Lǐ Níngpíng

Li Ningping (Chinese: 李宁平; born September 1951) is a retired Chinese politician and business executive. He entered the workforce in December 1968, and joined the Chinese Communist Party in August 1977. He worked in Gansu Electric Power Investment Co., Ltd. for 22 years, ultimately being appointed party chief and chairman. He was investigated by China's top anti-graft agency in December 2020. Before he stepped down, he had been retired for four years. He was a delegate to the 11th National People's Congress.

Li is the son of Li Ziqi, also a politician who served as executive vice governor, deputy party chief, and party chief of Gansu province.

== Biography ==
Li was born in Shenmu, Shaanxi, in September 1951, the son of Li Ziqi, former party chief of Gansu. At the dawn of the Cultural Revolution, in December 1968, he became a worker at the Fourth Metallurgical Construction Company. Four years later, he was transferred to Lanzhou Automobile Repair Factory. During that time, he was a part-time student at Gansu Traffic School between March 1979 and October 1979.

Li entered politics in January 1981 as an official in the Personnel Division of Gansu Material Reserve Bureau, while his father reinstated in the government as director and party branch secretary of Gansu Light Industry Bureau. In September 1983, he entered Gansu Provincial Party School, majoring in party and government management. After graduating in September 1985, he was promoted to be deputy party chief of Wuwei, concurrently holding the mayor position in April 1989.

He was appointed deputy manager of Gansu Electric Power Construction Investment and Development Company (now Gansu Electric Power Investment Co., Ltd.; 甘肃省电力投资集团有限责任公司), in November 1994, becoming manager in September 2002 and general manager in October 2005. He has been entitled to honor as the "National Model Worker" in 2010. He rose to become chairman in November 2013, serving in the post until his retirement in November 2016.

== Investigation ==
On December 18, 2020, he was put under investigation for alleged "serious violations of discipline and laws", the Central Commission for Discipline Inspection said in a statement on its website, without elaborating.

Business positions
New title	Chairman of Gansu Electric Power Investment Co., Ltd. 2013–2016	Succeeded by Pu Peiwen (蒲培文)
