= Ren Yi =

Ren Yi may refer to:

- Ren Bonian, also known as Ren Yi, Chinese painter
- Ren Yi (writer), Chinese political columnist
