= Liaoning Military District =

- 中国人民解放军辽宁省军区
- Founded: August 28, 1954; 71 years ago
- Country: China
- Allegiance: Chinese Communist Party
- Type: Military district
- Role: Command and control
- Part of: People's Liberation Army
- Headquarters: Shenyang, Liaoning

Commanders
- Commander: Major general (shaojiang) Lin Huomao
- Political Commisar: Major general (shaojiang) Liang Ping

Chinese name
- Simplified Chinese: 中国人民解放军辽宁省军区
- Traditional Chinese: 中國人民解放軍遼寧省軍區
Transcriptions
Standard Mandarin
- Hanyu Pinyin: Zhōngguó Rénmín Jiěfàngjūn Liáoníngshěng Jūnqū

The Liaoning Military District (Chinese: 中国人民解放军辽宁省军区; full name People's Liberation Army Liaoning Military District or PLA Liaoning Military District) is a military district of the National Defense Mobilization Department of the Central Military Commission in China.

== History ==
On 28 August 1954, the East Liaoning Military District and the West Liaoning Military District were merged to form the Liaoning Military District.

== Leaders ==
=== Commanders ===
Name (English)	Name (Chinese)	Tenure begins	Tenure ends	Note
He Qingji	贺庆积	July 1955	February 1968	
Zhang Haitang	张海堂	February 1968	June 1975	
Yang Dayi	杨大易	June 1975	May 1983	
Ding Jianrui	丁剑锐	May 1983	August 1985	
Wang Youhan	王有翰	August 1985	June 1990	
Xiang Jingyuan	向经源	June 1990	July 1996	
Liu Shuming	刘书明	July 1996	May 1997	
Wang Guiqin	王贵勤	May 1997	October 2002	
Qian Nanzhong	钱南忠	October 2002	October 2009	
Bao Tieyin	鲍铁印	October 2009	October 2012	
Zhou Hanjiang	周汉江	October 2012	September 2016	
Zhang Lianyi	张联义	September 2016	June 2021	
Lin Huomao	林火茂	June 2021		

=== Political commissars ===
Name (English)	Name (Chinese)	Tenure begins	Tenure ends	Note
Huang Oudong	黄欧东	August 1954	September 1959	
Huang Huoqing	黄火青	September 1959	January 1967	
Yang Qi	杨弃	January 1967	April 1975	
Li Daozhi	李道之	April 1975	April 1978	
Ren Zhongyi	任仲夷	April 1978	November 1980	
Guo Feng	郭峰	November 1980	June 1985	
Liu Dongfan	刘东藩	June 1985	June 1990	
Ma Shenglin	马盛林	June 1990	December 1992	
Gao Diancheng	高殿成	May 1993	June 1998	
Liu Shensi	刘慎思	June 1998	April 2001	
Zhang Deyou	张德友	April 2001	December 2006	
Zhuang Hongjun	庄红军	December 2006	August 2009	
Zhang Lin	张林	August 2009	December 2014	
Wang Bianjiang	王边疆	December 2004	October 2020	
Liang Ping	梁平	October 2020		
