= Xiang Jingyuan =

- 向经源

Commander of the Liaoning Military District
- In office June 1990 – July 1996
- Preceded by: Wang Youhan
- Succeeded by: Liu Shuming

Personal details
- Born: 1934 Yingshan County, Hubei, China
- Died: 2024 (aged 89–90) Shenyang, Liaoning, China
- Party: Chinese Communist Party
- Education: PLA Seventh Infantry School

Military service
- Allegiance: People's Republic of China
- Branch/service: People's Liberation Army Ground Force
- Years of service: 1951–1996
- Rank: Major general

Chinese name
- Simplified Chinese: 向经源
- Traditional Chinese: 向經源
Transcriptions
Standard Mandarin
- Hanyu Pinyin: Xiàng Jīngyuán

Xiang Jingyuan (Chinese: 向经源; 1934 – 21 January 2024) was a major general in the People's Liberation Army of China who served as commander of the Liaoning Military District from 1990 to 1996.

== Biography ==
Xiang was born in Yingshan County (now Guangshui), Hubei, in 1934.

Xiang enlisted in the People's Liberation Army (PLA) in 1951, and joined the Chinese Communist Party (CCP) in June 1956. He attained the rank of major general (shaojiang) in 1988. Xiang became commander of the Liaoning Military District in June 1996, and served until July 1996.

Xiang died in Shenyang, Liaoning, on 21 January 2024.

Military offices
Preceded by Wang Youhan	Commander of the Liaoning Military District; 1990–1996	Succeeded by Liu Shuming
