= Lin Ruo =

Chinese politician (1924–2012)

- 林若

Party Secretary of Guangdong
- In office July 1985 – January 1991
- Preceded by: Ren Zhongyi
- Succeeded by: Xie Fei

Personal details
- Born: July 19, 1924 Chao'an District, Chaozhou City, Guangdong
- Died: October 7, 2012 (aged 88) Guangzhou, Guangdong
- Party: Chinese Communist Party
- Education: Sun Yat-sen University

Chinese name
- Traditional Chinese: 林若
Transcriptions
Standard Mandarin
- Hanyu Pinyin: Lín Ruò
Yue: Cantonese
- Jyutping: Lam^{4} Joek^{6}
Southern Min
- Teochew Peng'im: Lim^{5} Riag^{8}

Lin Ruo (Chinese: 林若; pinyin: Lín Ruò; July 19, 1924 – October 7, 2012) was a Chinese politician who served as Party Committee Secretary of Guangdong Province. He held the post from 1985 to 1991. He was also a member of the 12th and 13th Central Committees of the Chinese Communist Party.

== Biography ==
Lin was a native of Chao'an District, Chaozhou City, Guangdong. He joined the Chinese Communist Party (CCP) in May 1945. In July 1945, he enrolled in the Sun Yat-sen University School of Literature. In 1947, he traveled to the Dong River guerilla warfare region to provide political guidance.

In March 1950, he was named the head of the CCP Guangdong Pearl River Local Committee Policy Research Office Group, as well as local positions in Zhongshan and Dongguan. In 1952, he was named party committee secretary of Dongguan. Lin was attacked during the Cultural Revolution.

In February 1971, he was named to the Zhenjiang local party committee, and in 1973 became the deputy party secretary and deputy Revolutionary Committee director of the Nanfang Daily newspaper. In 1975, Lin became the Guangzhou municipal party committee first secretary, and in 1982 transferred to become the Guangdong provincial party committee first secretary.

From 1985 to 1991, Lin served as the Guangdong provincial party committee secretary. From 1990 through December 1996, he served as chairman and party group secretary of the Guangdong provincial people's congress standing committee. He retired in September 2004.

Lin died on October 7, 2012, in Guangzhou following an illness.

Lin Ruo was a delegate to each National Congress of the Chinese Communist Party from the 12th through the 17th, a member of the 12th and 13th Central Committees of the Chinese Communist Party, and a delegate to the 7th and 8th National People's Congresses.

Party political offices
Preceded by Ren Zhongyi	Secretary of the CCP Guangdong Committee; 1985–1991	Succeeded by Xie Fei
