= Ren Yi (writer) =

Chinese writer

- 任意
- Born: 1980s
- Education: Harvard University
- Occupation: Social commentator
- Political party: Chinese Communist Party

Ren Yi (Chinese: 任意; pinyin: Rén Yì; born 1980s), known by his online alias Chairman Rabbit (Chinese: 兔主席; pinyin: Tù Zhǔxí), is a Chinese political columnist, active on social media platforms.

== Early life ==
Ren is the grandson of Ren Zhongyi, a Chinese Communist Party veteran and former first secretary of the CCP Guangdong Provincial Committee, and the son of Ren Kening, director of the China Aerospace Foundation. He grew up in Guangzhou and is fluent in Cantonese.

Ren studied in the United Kingdom and was invited by his grandfather Ren Zhongyi to serve as a research assistant for Professor Ezra F. Vogel, an American sinologist, on his book "China's Reform Era". He also assisted him in his research on Deng Xiaoping and the Transformation of China. He later obtained a master's degree from Harvard University's Kennedy School of Government and worked at the Fairbank Center for East Asian Studies. After graduation, he worked for a Chinese investment bank in Beijing and traveled between Beijing and Hong Kong.

== Publications ==
Ren has published articles in media such as Southern Metropolis Daily, Southern Weekly, and Yangcheng Evening News. His comments on Weibo are mainly social, political, and historical comments, and are often quoted by mainstream media. He claims that some of his articles were used as "internal reference" by the Chinese government. His 2020 article "It is not the Chinese government that awakened Chinese nationalism, but American politicians" was reprinted by People's Daily Online.

During the 2019–2020 Hong Kong protests, Ren published a large number of articles on Hong Kong issues from the perspective of the pro-Beijing camp, attracting a large number of mainland Chinese netizens' attention. The relevant articles were compiled into a collection titled "Torn City: Mysteries and Thoughts of the Hong Kong Movement" by Zhonghua Book Company in 2020.

After United States House Speaker Nancy Pelosi visited Taiwan in 2022, Ren harshly criticized Hu Xijin online.

After the outbreak of the White Paper Protests, Ren said he believed that "foreign forces" were involved in the protests.

== Works ==
- Torn City: Mysteries and Thoughts on the Hong Kong Movement. Hong Kong: Zhonghua Book Company. 8 October 2020. ISBN 9789888676293.
- "China's Road" and Parallel Worlds: Observations from a Chinese Perspective in the COVID-19 Era. Joint Publishing (Hong Kong) Co., Ltd. October 2022. ISBN 9789620450563.
