= Hao Peng (PRC) =

Chinese politician

- 郝鹏

Party Secretary of Liaoning
- In office 27 November 2022 – 30 September 2025
- Deputy: Li Lecheng; Wang Xinwei (governor)
- Preceded by: Zhang Guoqing
- Succeeded by: Xu Kunlin

Head of the State-owned Assets Supervision and Administration Commission
- In office 17 May 2019 – 3 February 2023
- Premier: Li Keqiang
- Preceded by: Xiao Yaqing
- Succeeded by: Zhang Yuzhuo

Governor of Qinghai
- In office 28 April 2013 – 20 December 2016
- Party Secretary: Luo Huining; Wang Guosheng
- Preceded by: Luo Huining
- Succeeded by: Wang Jianjun

Personal details
- Born: July 1960 (age 66) Fengxiang County, Shaanxi, China
- Party: Chinese Communist Party
- Education: Northwestern Polytechnical University

Chinese name
- Simplified Chinese: 郝鹏
- Traditional Chinese: 郝鵬
Transcriptions
Standard Mandarin
- Hanyu Pinyin: Hǎo Péng

Hao Peng (Chinese: 郝鹏; born July 1960, Shaanxi) is a Chinese politician and business executive. He served as the Party Secretary of Liaoning between 2022 and 2025, the governor of Qinghai between 2013 and 2016, and prior to that, a vice chairman of Tibet Autonomous Region. He additionally served as the chairman of the State-owned Assets Supervision and Administration Commission (SASAC) between 2019 and 2023.

== Career ==
=== Education and industry ===
Hao Peng is a native of Fengxiang County, Shaanxi province. He entered the work force in January 1976 as a sent-down youth in Weiyuan County, Gansu province.

After the Cultural Revolution, in October 1978 Hao entered Northwestern Polytechnical University in Xi'an, Shaanxi, majoring in aircraft manufacturing. He joined the Chinese Communist Party in March 1982 and graduated in July 1982.

After university Hao Peng joined the Aviation Industry Corporation of China, working at its flight control system factory in Lanzhou, Gansu. He started as a technician, becoming the Director of the factory in 1994, a position he held for five years.

=== Government ===
In February 1999 Hao Peng began his government career, becoming the Deputy Director of the Economic and Trade Committee of Gansu province. In August 2000 he was appointed Vice Mayor of the provincial capital Lanzhou.

Hao Peng was transferred to Tibet Autonomous Region in November 2003, where he was appointed Vice Chairman (governor). In 2006 he was promoted to Deputy Communist Party Chief and Executive Vice Chairman of Tibet.

In March 2013 Hao Peng was transferred again, to become the Deputy Communist Party Chief and Acting Governor of neighbouring Qinghai province. He succeeded the outgoing governor Luo Huining, who had been appointed the provincial party chief. In April Hao was officially elected Governor by the Qinghai Provincial Congress. In December 2016, he was appointed as the CCP Secretary of the State-owned Assets Supervision and Administration Commission. He was also appointed the Chairman of SASAC in May 2019.

In November 2022 Hao Peng was transferred to become the Party Secretary of Liaoning. On 3 February 2023, he was replaced by Zhang Yuzhuo as the chairman of the State-owned Assets Supervision and Administration Commission.

Hao is an alternate of the 18th Central Committee of the Chinese Communist Party, and a full member of the 19th Central Committee.

Party political offices
Preceded by Zhang Yijiong	Secretary of the Political and Legal Affairs Commission of the Tibet Autonomous Regional Committee of the Chinese Communist Party; 2010–2012	Succeeded by Deng Xiaogang
Preceded by Zhang Yijiong	President of the Party School of CCP Tibet Autonomous Region; 2011–2012	Succeeded by Han Yong
Preceded by Zhang Yi	Party Secretary of the State-owned Assets Supervision and Administration Commission; 2016–2022	Succeeded by Zhang Yuzhuo
Preceded by Zhang Guoqing	Party Secretary of Liaoning; 2022–2025	Succeeded by Xu Kunlin
Government offices
Preceded by Luo Huining	Governor of Qinghai; 2013–2016	Succeeded by Wang Jianjun
Preceded by Xiao Yaqing	Chairman of the State-owned Assets Supervision and Administration Commission; 2019–2022	Succeeded by Zhang Yuzhuo
