= Wen Shizhen (politician, born 1940) =

Chinese politician (1940–2021)

- 闻世震
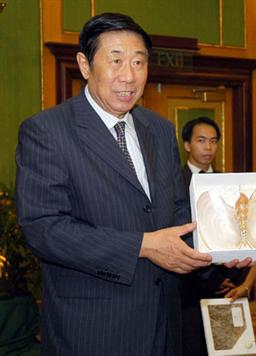
- Wen in 2006

Chairman of the Standing Committee of Liaoning People's Congress
- In office January 2003 – February 2005
- Preceded by: Wang Huaiyuan
- Succeeded by: Li Keqiang

Party Secretary of Liaoning
- In office August 1997 – December 2004
- Preceded by: Gu Jinchi
- Succeeded by: Li Keqiang

Governor of Liaoning
- In office May 1994 – 1998
- Preceded by: Yue Qifeng
- Succeeded by: Zhang Guoguang

Personal details
- Born: January 1940 Haicheng County, Fengtian Province, Manchukuo
- Died: 27 July 2021 (aged 81) Beijing, China
- Party: Chinese Communist Party
- Education: Dalian University of Technology

Chinese name
- Simplified Chinese: 闻世震
- Traditional Chinese: 聞世震
Transcriptions
Standard Mandarin
- Hanyu Pinyin: Wén Shìzhèn

Wen Shizhen (Chinese: 闻世震; January 1940 – 27 July 2021) was a Chinese politician who served as governor of Liaoning from 1994 to 1998, party secretary of Liaoning from 1997 to 2004, and chairman of the Standing Committee of Liaoning People's Congress from 2003 to 2005. He was a delegate to the 11th National People's Congress. He was a member of the 15th and 16th Central Committee of the Chinese Communist Party. He was a delegate to the 19th National Congress of the Chinese Communist Party.

== Early life and education ==
Wen was born in Haicheng County, Fengtian Province, Manchukuo (now Liaoning, China), in January 1940. He secondary studied at Shenyang No.5 High School. In 1960, he was admitted to Dalian University of Technology, majoring in mechanical manufacturing. After graduating in 1965, he was despatched to the Dalian Oil Pump and Nozzle Factory, where he finally was its factory manager.

== Career ==
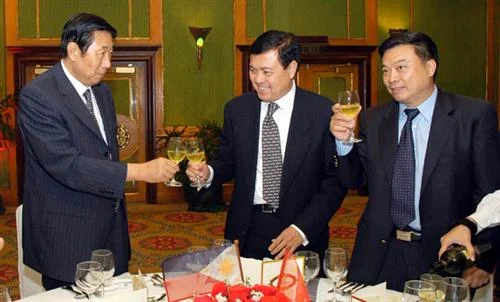
Wen (left) as Vice-Chairman of the Financial and Economic Affairs Committee with Philippine Senate President Manny Villar (center) at Century Park Hotel, November 2006

He joined the Chinese Communist Party in December 1979. He was deputy director of Dalian Machinery Industry Bureau in 1982 and one year later became deputy director of Liaoning Machinery Industry Department. In 1985, he was assistant governor of Liaoning, but having held the position for only one year, he was appointed vice governor and deputy party chief of Liaoning. In August 1995, he was elected governor of Liaoning on the First Session of the 8th Liaoning People's Congress, and held that office until 1998. In August 1997, he was appointed party chief of Liaoning, a position he held until December 2004. He became chairman of the Standing Committee of Liaoning People's Congress in January 2003, and served until February 2005.

In February 2005, he was appointed vice chairperson of the National People's Congress Financial and Economic Affairs Committee, serving in the post until his retirement in 2013.

== Death ==
He died of illness in Beijing on 27 July 2021, aged 81. On 31 July 2021, he was buried in Huilonggang Revolutionary Cemetery in Shenyang, Liaoning.

Government offices
Preceded by Yue Qifeng	Governor of Liaoning; 1994–1998	Succeeded by Zhang Guoguang
Party political offices
Preceded by Gu Jinchi	Party Secretary of Liaoning; 1997–2004	Succeeded by Li Keqiang
Assembly seats
Preceded by Wang Huaiyuan	Chairman of the Standing Committee of Liaoning People's Congress; 2003–2005	Succeeded by Li Keqiang
