= Su Hongzhang =

Chinese politician

- 苏宏章

Secretary of the Political and Legal Affairs Commission of Liaoning
- In office October 2011 – April 6, 2016
- Preceded by: Li Feng (李峰)
- Succeeded by: Li Wenzhang (李文章)

Personal details
- Born: May 1959 (age 67) Shenyang, Liaoning
- Party: Chinese Communist Party (expelled)
- Education: Liaoning University

Su Hongzhang (Chinese: 苏宏章; born May 1959) is a former Chinese politician, and Secretary of the Political and Legal Affairs Commission of Liaoning Province. He was dismissed from his position in April 2016 for investigation by the Central Commission for Discipline Inspection.

== Early life and education ==
Su Hongzhang was born in Shenyang, Liaoning. He joined the Chinese Communist Party (CCP) in 1985 and graduated from Liaoning University with a bachelor's degree in philosophy in 1983.

== Career ==
In 1995, Su served as deputy governor of Heishan County and deputy head of the CCP Publicity Department of Liaoning. In 2000 he became the CCP Deputy Committee Secretary of Fushun and moved to the post of the deputy party chief of Shenyang in 2007. Su was promoted to head the Political and Legal Affairs Commission of Liaoning in October 2011, and a member of the provincial party standing committee, a part of the province's highest echelon of power.

== Investigation ==
On April 6, 2016, Su Hongzhang was placed under investigation by the Central Commission for Discipline Inspection, the party's internal disciplinary body, for "serious violations of regulations". Su was the first provincial-level Zhengfawei chief to fall under the axe of the anti-corruption campaign under Xi Jinping.

The investigation against Su was opened shortly after the downfall of the one-time party chief of Liaoning, Wang Min. Chinese media reported that Su had given gold-plated materials to his superiors as a bribe in order to be promoted. It was considered highly unusual that he was elevated directly from the Shenyang deputy party chief position to a provincial party standing committee position overnight. The conjecture of events led the media to report that in all likelihood the "superior" Su had bribed was Wang Min.

Su was expelled from the CCP on July 25, 2016. He was said to have bribed people during the "democratic consultation process" and internal party election, interfered in specific judicial cases, taken bribes in exchange for promotions, and conducted illicit "money-for-sex transactions".

On May 19, 2017, Su was sentenced on 14 years in prison for taking bribes worth 19.96 million yuan (~$2.93 million) and giving bribes worth 1.1 million yuan (~$0.16 million) by the Intermediate People's Court in Harbin.
