= Li Changchun =

Chinese politician

- 李长春
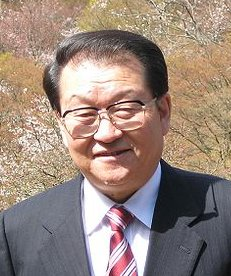
- Li in 2009

Chairman of the Central Guidance Commission for Building Spiritual Civilization
- In office 15 November 2002 – 18 January 2013
- Deputy: Liu Yunshan; Chen Zhili; Liu Yandong; Liu Qi
- General Secretary: Hu Jintao
- Preceded by: Ding Guangen
- Succeeded by: Liu Yunshan

Party Secretary of Guangdong
- In office March 1998 – November 2002
- Deputy: Lu Ruihua (governor)
- Preceded by: Xie Fei
- Succeeded by: Zhang Dejiang

Personal details
- Born: February 1, 1944 (age 82) Kwantung Leased Territory, Japanese Empire (Now Dalian, China)
- Party: Chinese Communist Party (1965–present)
- Education: Harbin Institute of Technology

Li Changchun
- Simplified Chinese: 李长春
- Traditional Chinese: 李長春
Transcriptions
Standard Mandarin
- Hanyu Pinyin: Lǐ Chángchūn

Li Changchun (born February 1, 1944) is a retired Chinese politician and a former senior leader of the Chinese Communist Party. He served on the Politburo Standing Committee, the party's top leadership council, and as the top official in charge of propaganda, between 2002 and 2012. He also served as Chairman of the CCP Central Guidance Commission for Building Spiritual Civilization, de facto head of propaganda and media relations.

Li had a widely varying political career spanning three provinces, first as Governor of Liaoning, then Party Secretary of Henan, and then CCP Committee Secretary of Guangdong, before being promoted to the national leadership in 2002. He retired in 2012.

== Biography ==
=== Early life and career ===
Li Changchun was born in February 1944 in modern-day Dalian, Liaoning, then administered by the Empire of Japan as "Dairen", Kwantung Leased Territory. He joined the Chinese Communist Party (CCP) in 1965 and graduated with a degree in electrical engineering from the Harbin Institute of Technology in 1966. In 1983, at age 39, he became the youngest mayor and Party secretary of a major city, of Shenyang, the capital of Liaoning. In 1982, he was also made an alternate member of the Central Committee of the Chinese Communist Party at the age of 38, the youngest member of the body at the time. In 1987, he became governor of Liaoning province, a post he kept until 1990. As governor, mainland China's first expressway was built in the province, linking the cities of Shenyang and Dalian. In addition, Li pushed for the reform of state-owned enterprises, aiming to decrease state involvement in their operations.

After General Secretary Zhao Ziyang was purged from the party leadership in 1989 during the fallout from the Tiananmen Square protests that same year, Li was initially also thought to have been removed from the leadership because he was a supporter of Zhao. Li's appearance on state television weeks later showed that this was not the case.

In 1990, Li was transferred from his job in Liaoning province to central Henan province. In his memoirs, Li recounted that he was ill-prepared for his new assignment and felt homesick. The central authorities had not given him much prior notice about his transfer, and did not inform him why he was being moved or facilitate an orderly transition process. Li, as a result, was somewhat critical of the party's transfer process but nonetheless duly accepted his new assignment. He had succeeded then-Henan governor Cheng Weigao, who had been transferred to Hebei province as part of a three-province 'leader swap' orchestrated by the party's leaders. Henan, a populous agricultural province without a strong industrial base, presented Li with significant challenges, and Li had experienced unease settling into his new home.

Two years later, in 1992, Li was promoted to party chief of Henan. It would be Li's first job as "first-in-charge" of a province. Being accustomed to serving in government administration, Li's tenure in Henan was his first taste of being in charge of party affairs. Li said that initially being the top leader in the province made him uncomfortable as he had to shoulder all responsibility, especially at a time when other regions were developing economically at a pace much faster than that of Henan. Overall, his tenure in Henan was seen as mediocre. Rural incomes remained stagnant during his term, and his government was also criticized for its role in the Plasma Economy, where farmers were encouraged to donate blood through unsafe practices, triggering China's largest outbreak of HIV/AIDS.

=== Guangdong ===
Li was promoted to the Politburo of the Chinese Communist Party in 1997, largely due to having secured the patronage of the paramount leader and Party General Secretary Jiang Zemin. In his memoirs, Li said that he was surprised at having been appointed to the Politburo. In 1998, Jiang dispatched Li to serve as Guangdong Party Secretary. It was said that Jiang wanted to use Li as a counterbalance to the entrenched local political establishment composed mostly of people native to the province. In Guangdong, Li cracked down on corruption to "put the house in order." During the 1997 Asian financial crisis, Li set up a special task force to evaluate what to do with non-performing loans owed by two of the province's largest financial companies. He appointed former central bank deputy governor Wang Qishan to oversee the task force. Li shook up the local banking sector and closed a plethora of local credit unions and agencies. He also increased access to the legal aid system for the poor in the province. His tenure in Guangdong was seen as largely successful, having averted the brunt of the 1997 Asian financial crisis and also bringing Guangdong back to the political control of the central leadership under Jiang Zemin after sidelined many local officials promoted by Ye Xuanping, former Governor of Guangdong and the elder son of Marshal Ye Jianying.

Li's tenure in Guangdong made him one of Jiang's favourites and as such Jiang was preparing to groom him for succession for the premiership upon incumbent Premier Zhu Rongji's scheduled retirement in 2003. However, Zhu had been favouring Wen Jiabao for the Premier office, and criticized Li over his handling of an "export rebate fraud" scandal in the coastal city of Shantou in 2000, which took place during Li's term as Guangdong party chief. By the end, Wen won this competition and became Premier of China in March 2003. Li's intention to promote Huang Liman, a female friend of Jiang's who was considered incompetent, to the party chief position in the coastal city of Shenzhen became a sticking point for Jiang's political opponents.

=== Politburo Standing Committee ===
As expected, Li was named a member of the Politburo Standing Committee after Jiang's departure as General Secretary of the CCP in 2002. By then, Li was seen by political observers as firmly belonging to Jiang's camp. He was considered one of Jiang's major 'patronage appointments' to the top ruling council along with other staunch Jiang loyalists such as Jia Qinglin and Huang Ju. Li was ranked eighth in the party hierarchy out of the nine members of the new PSC, given the portfolio of supervising the Party organs that dealt with propaganda and ideology while taking on no other official party or state titles.

Li was the first propaganda chief to preside over the growth of the internet in China, and as a result was largely seen as having been the forerunner in developing the internet censorship regime that became increasingly extensive over the course of his tenure. In October 2007, at the 17th Party Congress, it was announced that Li, then aged 63 (below the unofficial age of retirement for PSC members, 67), would serve another term as propaganda chief. In addition, Li was elevated from eight position in the protocol sequence to fifth, in front of Hu Jintao's putative successor Xi Jinping.

There were high hopes among some in media circles that Li would signal a more liberal change from the strictures of former propaganda chief Ding Guangen. Li had made a major speech advocating that media stay "close to the public" and to real events, "instead of mechanically following Party directives." In addition, Li was also seen as a leading reformer due to his legacy in Guangdong, where he was not afraid to take on entrenched interests and introduce further market economic reforms. The hopes were short-lived however, though, after the Central Publicity Department began closing newspapers, firing journalists, and would not allow foreign companies to produce content for TV stations in China. Many editors were punished and Li Changchun "started sounding and acting like another Ding Guangen."

In his position as China's propaganda chief from 2002 to 2012, Li was said to have contributed heavily to China's censorship campaign and frequently ordered media to downplay or not report on certain events. In 2006, he told the members of the All-China Journalists Association to "closely encircle the overall work of the party and state". Li approved the construction of the National Museum in 2006 after a series of disputes and delays about the building of the museum. He was the guest of honor at the opening of the National Center for the Performing Arts.

Li has put his support behind a number of creative projects that might otherwise have been censored by the government. He supported Zen Shaolin, a music, dance and martial arts show intended to increase tourism that opened in 2007 in Henan, despite the producers' concerns that a celebration of religion and sacred music would be opposed by the government. Li allowed a 2009 movie Nanking! Nanking! by Lu Chuan to continue running in theaters in the face of strong pressure from nationalists who objected to the sympathetic characterization in the film of a Japanese soldier. The film was one of ten chosen to help commemorate 60th anniversary of the People's Republic of China.

In May 2009, American diplomats reported in a cable that was later leaked that Li was a driving force behind China's renewed pressure against Google to comply with Chinese censorship laws. Li was reportedly unhappy that Chinese Google search results for his and his children's names contained results critical of them. He subsequently ordered major Chinese firms to cease doing business with Google, and one source with connections to political elite claimed Li had directed a subsequent cyberattack against Google in retaliation. In 2009, at a theoretical seminar to commemorate the 30th anniversary of the 3rd plenary session of the 11th CCP Central Committee, Li coined the Six Why's, insisting on the political primacy of the CCP. The Six Why's was seen as a counterattack against Premier Wen Jiabao's speech in support of universal values.

In June 2012, Li made a speech at a political theories seminar, where he emphasized the importance of popularizing Chinese-style Marxism, saying it was important to "enhance public faith in the country’s political theory amid social conflict" and "to answer the public’s doubts, reach a consensus and generate strength".

Li retired from PSC in 2012, when Liu Yunshan succeeded his position as the propaganda chief.

== Personal life ==
Li is married to Zhang Shurong (张淑荣), his college sweetheart. Zhang was an engineer.

Party political offices
Preceded by Hou Zongbin	Party Secretary of Henan; 1992–1998	Succeeded by Ma Zhongchen
Preceded by Xie Fei	Party Secretary of Guangdong; 1998–2002	Succeeded by Zhang Dejiang
Preceded by Ding Guangen	Chairman of the CCP Central Guidance Commission for Building Spiritual Civilization; 2002–2013	Succeeded by Liu Yunshan
Preceded by Ding Guangen	Leader of the Leading Group for Propaganda and Ideological Work; 2002–2013	Succeeded by Liu Yunshan
Political offices
Preceded by Quan Shuren	Governor of Liaoning; 1987–1990	Succeeded by Yue Qifeng
Preceded by Cheng Weigao	Governor of Henan; 1990–1992	Succeeded by Ma Zhongchen
Preceded by Lin Xiao	Chairman of the Henan People's Standing Congress; 1993–1998	Succeeded by Ren Keli
Order of precedence
Preceded by Jia Qinglin; Conference Chairman	5th Rank of the Chinese Communist Party; 17th Politburo Standing Committee	Succeeded by Xi Jinping; Vice President
Preceded by Wu Guanzheng; Discipline Secretary	8th Rank of the Chinese Communist Party; 16th Politburo Standing Committee	Succeeded by Luo Gan; Political and Legislative
