= Zhan'erxiang =

Zhan'erxiang 站儿巷镇
- Town
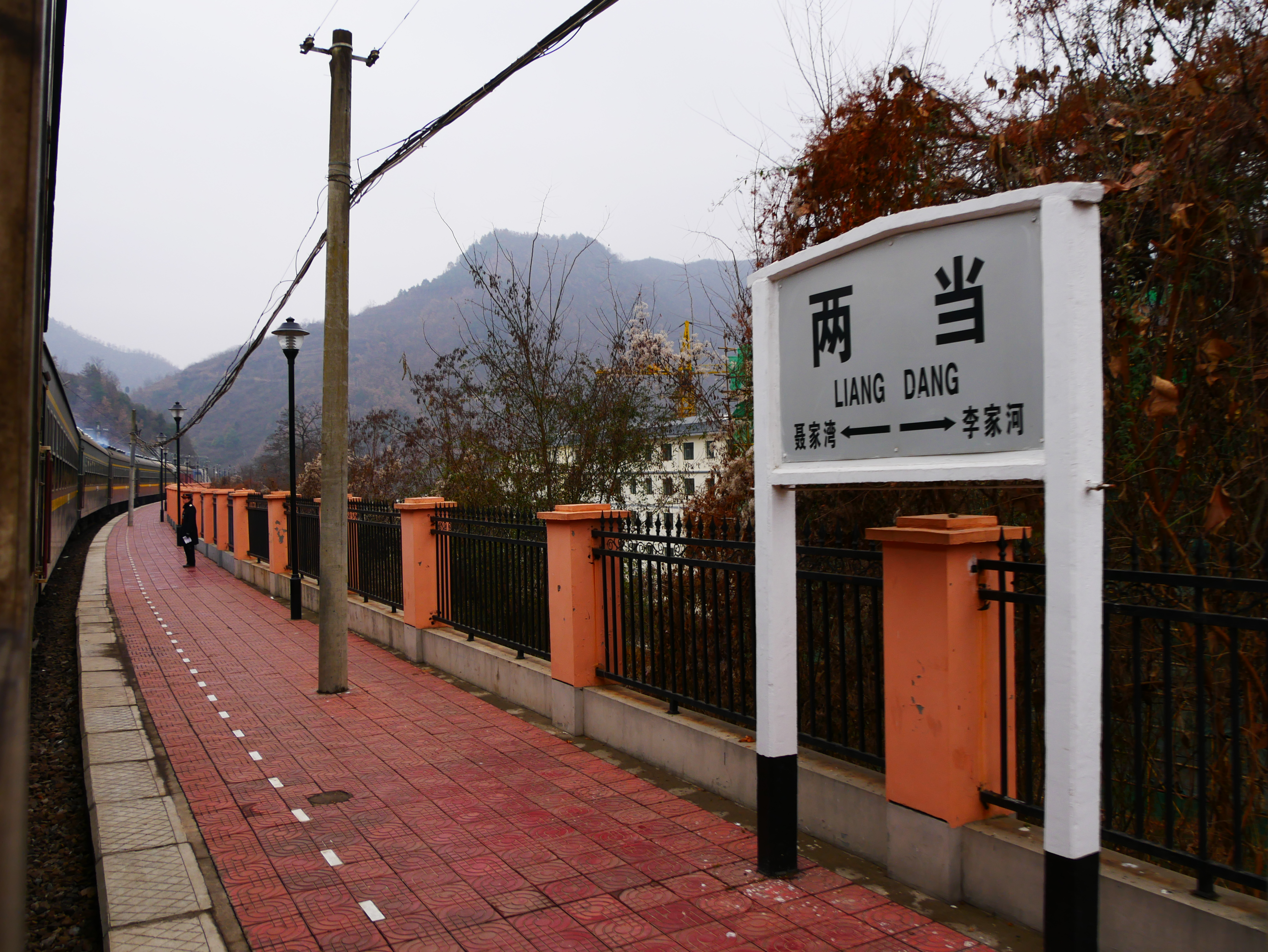
- Liangdang railway station

- Location within China Location within Gansu
- Coordinates: 33°46′N 106°18′E

Area
  - Total: 98.77 km^{2} (38.14 sq mi)
- Elevation: 1,596.5 m (5,238 ft)

Population (2008)
  - Total: 3,944

Zhan'erxiang is a town of Liangdang County, Gansu, China, located around 20 kms from Liangdang's county seat. In 2008 it had a population of 3,944. Liangdang railway station, which opened in 1955, is the only station in Liangdang handling passengers.

In 1962 it was established as Zhan'erxiang commune, in 1983 it became a township and in 2003 it received its current town status.

Locals cultivate morchella and matsutake mushrooms, Chinese herbal medicine and engage in aquaculture.
