= Six Why's =

Political term by Li Changchun

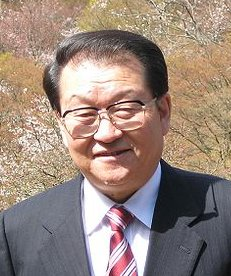
Li Changchun

Six Why's (Chinese: 六个为什么; pinyin: Liù gè wèishéme) is a political term coined by Li Changchun, a member of the Politburo Standing Committee of the Chinese Communist Party, in his speech at a theoretical seminar in 2009 to commemorate the 30th anniversary of the 3rd plenary session of the 11th CCP Central Committee. It is seen as a counterattack against Premier Wen Jiabao's speech in support of universal values.

== Content ==
The six whys are:

1. Why we must uphold Marxism's guiding role in the ideological field and not diversify our guiding ideology.
2. Why only socialism can save China, and only socialism with Chinese characteristics can develop China, but not democratic socialism and capitalism.
3. Why we must adhere to the system of people's congresses and not the separation of powers.
4. Why we must adhere to the multi-party cooperation and political consultation system under the leadership of the Chinese Communist Party, and not adopt the Western multi-party system.
5. Why we must adhere to the basic economic system with public ownership as the main body and multiple ownership economies developing together, and not privatization or pure public ownership.
6. Why we must unswervingly adhere to reform and opening up and not go back.
