= Li Ziqi (politician) =

Chinese politician

- 李子奇

Delegate to the 9th National People's Congress
- In office March 1998 – March 2003
- Chairman: Li Peng

Member of the 8th Standing Committee of the Chinese People's Political Consultative Conference
- In office March 1993 – March 1998
- Chairman: Li Ruihuan

Director of Gansu Provincial Advisory Commission
- In office November 1990 – December 1993

Party Secretary of Gansu
- In office March 1983 – November 1990
- Preceded by: Feng Jixin
- Succeeded by: Gu Jinchi

Personal details
- Born: September 29, 1923 Shenmu County, Shaanxi, China
- Died: January 11, 2014 (aged 90) Shanghai, China
- Party: Chinese Communist Party
- Children: Li Ningping
- Occupation: Revolutionist, politician

Li Ziqi (Chinese: 李子奇; pinyin: Lǐ Zǐqí; September 29, 1923 – January 11, 2014) was a Chinese politician who was Communist Party Secretary of Gansu from 1983 to 1990 and Director of Gansu Provincial Advisory Commission from 1990 to 1993.

== Personal life ==
Li's son, Li Ningping (born 1951), is a retired politician and business executive who has been investigated by China's top anti-graft agency in December 2020.

Party political offices
Preceded by Feng Jixin	Party Secretary of Gansu; 1983–1990	Succeeded by Gu Jinchi
