= Liangdang County =

Liangdang County 两当县 Liangtang
- County
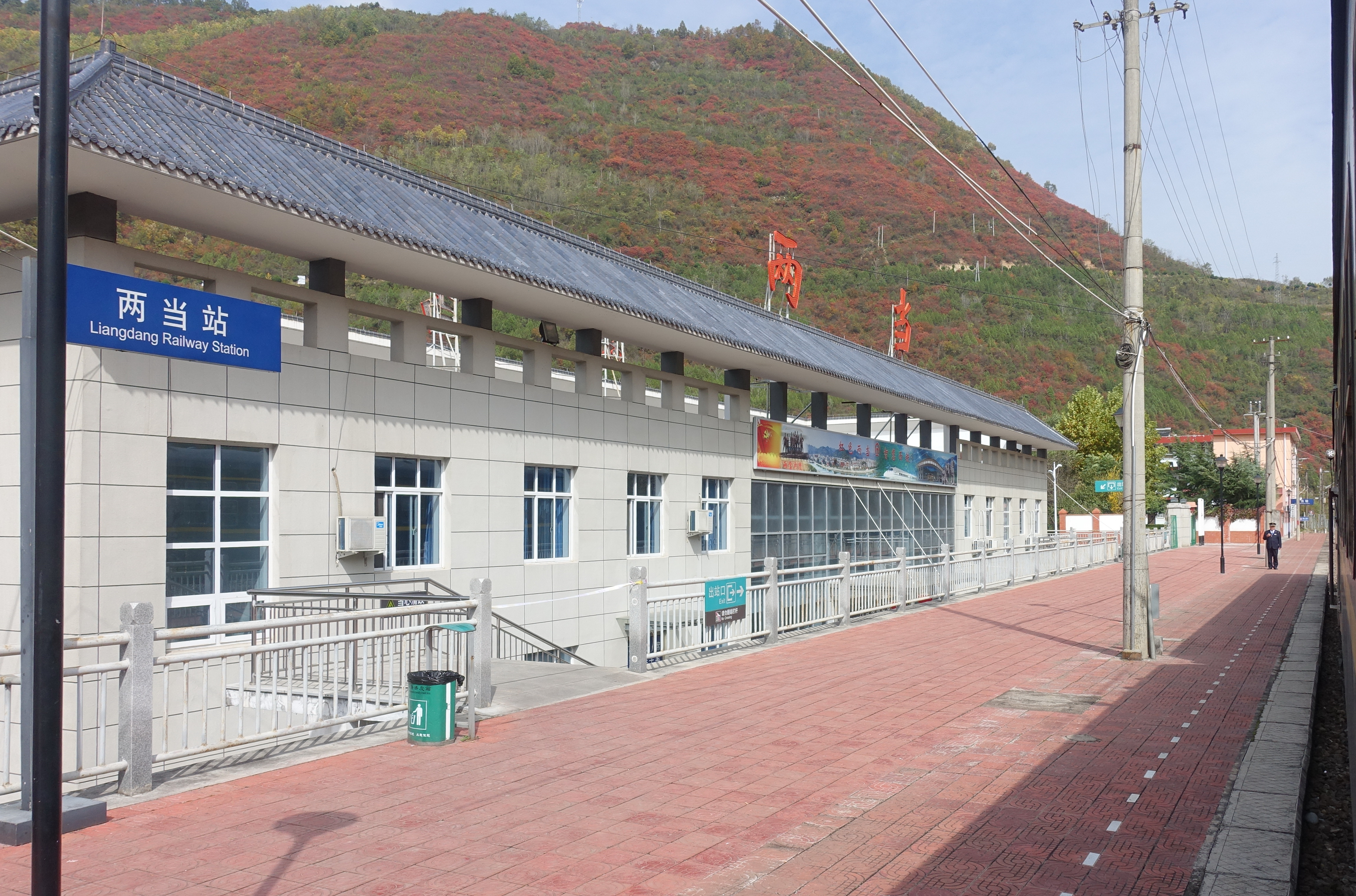
- Liangdang railway station

- Location of the seat in Gansu
- Coordinates: 33°47′55″N 106°23′43″E
- Country: China
- Province: Gansu
- Prefecture-level city: Longnan
- County seat: Chengguan

Area
  - Total: 1,408.73 km^{2} (543.91 sq mi)

Population (2010)
  - Total: 50,429
  - Density: 35.797/km^{2} (92.715/sq mi)
- Time zone: UTC+8 (China Standard)
- Postal code: 742400

Liangdang County (simplified Chinese: 两当县; traditional Chinese: 兩當縣; pinyin: Liǎngdāng Xiàn) is a county under the administration of Longnan City, in the southeast of Gansu Province of China. It has a land area of 1,374 km^{2} (531 sq mi), and a population of 50,000 in 2004. The postal code is 742400. The county seat is located in Chengguan Town. In 2017 it was the poorest county in Gansu.

Liangdang is best known in China for an April 1932 uprising launched by Xi Zhongxun, father of Xi Jinping.

== Administrative divisions ==
Liangdang County is divided to 6 towns and 6 townships.

Towns

- Chengguan (城关镇)

Towns upgraded from townships:

- Zhan'erxiang (站儿巷镇)
- Xipo (西坡镇)
- Yangdian (杨店镇)
- Xianlong (显龙镇)
- Yunping (云屏镇)

Townships

- Zuojia Township (左家乡)
- Yuchi Township (鱼池乡)
- Xinghua Township (兴化乡)
- Zhangjia Township (张家乡)
- Taishan Township (泰山乡)
- Jindong Township (金洞乡)

Former townships:

- Taiyang Township (太阳乡)
- Guangjin Township (广金乡)

== Climate ==
Climate data for Liangdang, elevation 961 m (3,153 ft), (1991–2020 normals, extremes 1981–present)
Month	Jan	Feb	Mar	Apr	May	Jun	Jul	Aug	Sep	Oct	Nov	Dec	Year
Record high °C (°F)	16.8 (62.2)	21.6 (70.9)	30.0 (86.0)	32.9 (91.2)	34.3 (93.7)	37.0 (98.6)	37.3 (99.1)	36.7 (98.1)	35.4 (95.7)	28.5 (83.3)	23.1 (73.6)	16.0 (60.8)	37.3 (99.1)
Mean daily maximum °C (°F)	6.7 (44.1)	9.8 (49.6)	15.2 (59.4)	21.4 (70.5)	24.9 (76.8)	28.2 (82.8)	29.9 (85.8)	28.9 (84.0)	23.3 (73.9)	17.9 (64.2)	12.7 (54.9)	7.7 (45.9)	18.9 (66.0)
Daily mean °C (°F)	0.1 (32.2)	3.4 (38.1)	8.2 (46.8)	13.7 (56.7)	17.6 (63.7)	21.2 (70.2)	23.5 (74.3)	22.5 (72.5)	17.7 (63.9)	12.2 (54.0)	6.4 (43.5)	1.1 (34.0)	12.3 (54.2)
Mean daily minimum °C (°F)	−4.2 (24.4)	−1.1 (30.0)	3.1 (37.6)	7.9 (46.2)	11.9 (53.4)	15.8 (60.4)	18.6 (65.5)	18.1 (64.6)	14.2 (57.6)	8.7 (47.7)	2.4 (36.3)	−3.1 (26.4)	7.7 (45.8)
Record low °C (°F)	−15.4 (4.3)	−10.4 (13.3)	−9.8 (14.4)	−2.1 (28.2)	2.1 (35.8)	6.8 (44.2)	11.7 (53.1)	10.7 (51.3)	4.3 (39.7)	−5.2 (22.6)	−9.5 (14.9)	−16.3 (2.7)	−16.3 (2.7)
Average precipitation mm (inches)	2.9 (0.11)	6.9 (0.27)	18.6 (0.73)	40.5 (1.59)	63.7 (2.51)	78.3 (3.08)	126.0 (4.96)	104.4 (4.11)	102.5 (4.04)	55.8 (2.20)	15.2 (0.60)	3.5 (0.14)	618.3 (24.34)
Average precipitation days (≥ 0.1 mm)	4.3	5.2	8.0	9.1	11.5	11.6	12.5	12.4	13.6	12.7	7.1	4.1	112.1
Average snowy days	7.9	5.0	1.6	0.3	0	0	0	0	0	0.1	1.3	4.0	20.2
Average relative humidity (%)	65	63	62	64	67	71	75	77	82	82	77	69	71
Mean monthly sunshine hours	127.2	108.4	143.3	179.6	197.5	190.5	199.6	186.4	115.9	109.4	114.4	129.8	1,802
Percentage possible sunshine	40	35	38	46	46	44	46	45	32	32	37	42	40
Source: China Meteorological Administrationall-time July record
