= COVID-19 pandemic in Guangdong =

Ongoing COVID-19 viral pandemic in Guangdong Province, China

- Disease: COVID-19
- Pathogen: SARS-CoV-2
- Location: Guangdong, China
- First outbreak: Wuhan, Hubei
- Arrival date: 2020
- Confirmed cases: 12,819
- Recovered: 11,259
- Deaths: 8

The COVID-19 pandemic reached the province of Guangdong, China, in 2020.

== Statistics ==
Division	Active	Confirmed	Deceased	Recovered
Guangdong		82,440	8	11,259
Guangzhou	37,200	1	3,999	
Shenzhen	4,392	3	4,224	
Foshan	1,237	0	472	
Dongguan	734	1	495	
Zhuhai	801	1	465	
Zhanjiang	1,487	0	304	
Huizhou	813	0	156	
Jiangmen	612	0	163	
Zhongshan	852	0	155	
Maoming	1,064	0	90	
Shantou	1,160	0	31	
Zhaoqing	650	1	54	
Meizhou	206	0	19	
Yangjiang	597	0	53	
Shaoguan	441	1	12	
Qingyuan	66	0	24	
Shanwei	130	0	13	
Yunfu	519	0	7	
Jieyang	61	0	11	
Heyuan	146	0	9	
Chaozhou	572	0	7	
As of 4 January 2023 （Confirmed case data includes recovered cases and deaths）

== Related measures ==
On January 26, Shantou City's new coronavirus-infected pneumonia epidemic headquarters announced that from 2 p.m. on the same day, the city's operating passenger cars, urban buses, taxis, and ferries would be suspended, and vehicles, ships, or people will be prohibited from entering Shantou from the early morning of the next day except for the permitted emergency, special, and material support needs. The main line of the expressway passing through the Shantou City area can pass normally, and most of the inter-county passages in the city are closed. In addition, strictly check, screen, and persuade people who enter Shantou from Shantou Station and Chaoyang Station to return. A few hours after the release of the relevant announcement, the Shantou Novel Coronavirus Infected Pneumonia Epidemic Headquarters issued another announcement at 1 p.m. on the same day, canceling the city closure arrangement and instead strengthening the epidemic monitoring and prevention and control of mobile personnel, but the entry and exit of vehicles, ships, personnel, and materials would not be restricted. At 2:00 p.m. on the same day, the Office of the Prevention and Control Headquarters for the Prevention and Control of Pneumonia Infected by the New Coronavirus in Guangdong Province issued a notice, deciding to implement control measures for people entering public places to wear masks within the territory of the province. People who do not wear masks to enter the venue should be dissuaded, and those who do not listen to the dissuasion should report to the relevant competent authorities in accordance with relevant laws and regulations, and the relevant competent authorities will deal with them according to their respective responsibilities. Obstructing emergency response personnel from performing their duties shall be subject to administrative punishment and even criminal responsibility according to law. Following the release of the "Guidelines for the Use of Pneumonia Masks to Prevent Novel Coronavirus Infection" by the National Health Commission, a revised version of the circular was issued on February 5. Various cultural performances and cultural activities originally scheduled to be held in Chaozhou during the Spring Festival and Lantern Festival had been suspended, and all kinds of public cultural and sports venues at all levels in Chaozhou City had been temporarily closed and related activities had been cancelled.

== Related disputes ==
In late January 2020, when the COVID-19 epidemic continued and began to spread to other provinces and cities in the People’s Republic of China, a reporter from the news team on Chinese cable television visited the Guangzhou Flower Market that opened before the Lunar New Year. Among them, a group of middle-aged men and women showed that they were not worried about the epidemic. The two "aunts" danced to the camera and shouted in Cantonese, "Don't be surprised! There is a government, there is a government, don't be surprised!" The reporter asked if they don't even need to wear masks. The woman replied, "Don't wear it! Be healthy! We have today every year! Trust the government!". Many netizens ridiculed their remarks. Fragments and screenshots of this visit were made into stickers and spread widely, resulting in many remaps.

== See also ==
- COVID-19
- COVID-19 pandemic: COVID-19 pandemic in mainland China, COVID-19 pandemic in Hong Kong, COVID-19 pandemic in Macau, COVID-19 pandemic in Taiwan, COVID-19 pandemic in Japan, COVID-19 pandemic in Malaysia, COVID-19 pandemic in Singapore, COVID-19 pandemic in Thailand, COVID-19 pandemic in the United States, COVID-19 pandemic on cruise ships
- COVID-19 pandemic by country and territory: Statistics of the COVID-19 pandemic in mainland China
- SARS-CoV-2
