= Zhang Wenyue =

Chinese politician

Zhang Wenyue (simplified Chinese: 张文岳; traditional Chinese: 張文岳; pinyin: Zhāng Wényuè; born October 1944) was the Party Secretary of Liaoning, succeeding Li Keqiang from October 2007. In 2009 he retired and was succeeded by Wang Min.

== Biography ==
A native of Pucheng, Fujian province and a graduate of the Beijing Institute of Geology, Zhang joined the Chinese Communist Party in June 1965. During the Cultural Revolution, Zhang was placed in an army work troupe, subsequently being sent to Sichuan in 1969. Since then his career had been largely concentrated in the geological field until 1995, when he was transferred to work in Xinjiang as the autonomous region's deputy party secretary.

From 1999 to 2001 he served as the commander-in-chief of the Xinjiang Production and Construction Corps, before moving onto Liaoning to succeed Bo Xilai to become the province's governor in 2004.

Political offices
Preceded by Xiao Zuofu	Chairman of Liaoning CPPCC; 2003–2004	Succeeded by Guo Tingbiao
Government offices
Preceded by Bo Xilai	Governor of Liaoning; 2004–2007	Succeeded by Chen Zhenggao
Party political offices
Preceded by Li Keqiang	Party Secretary of Liaoning; 2007–2009	Succeeded by Wang Min
