= Jia Zhijie =

Chinese politician

Jia Zhijie (Chinese: 贾志杰; born 1935) is a retired politician of the People's Republic of China. He was born in Jilin Province. He graduated from the Moscow Petroleum Institute in 1960, the same year he joined the Chinese Communist Party (CCP). He served as governor of Gansu (1986–1993) and Hubei.

As governor of Gansu, he defended the state's first eugenics law passed in 1989. About 1.2 percent of Gansu's 22 million people were intellectually disabled, the highest rate in China. Jia Zhijie stated that, "Insane, dull-witted and idiotic people must first complete sterilization operations before they can register for marriage. Some people say this is inhumane, but we think just the opposite is true."

== Political career ==
1998—2003	Deputy, 9th NPC
1997—2002	Member, 15th CCP, Central Committee
1994—2000	Secretary, CCP, Provincial Committee Hubei Province
1993—1993	Vice-Governor, People's Government Hubei Province
1993—1994	Deputy Secretary, CCP, Provincial Committee Hubei Province
1993—1993	Acting Governor, People's Government Hubei Province
1993—1994	Governor, People's Government Hubei Province
1992—1997	Member, 14th CCP, Central Committee
1987—1992	Member, 13th CCP, Central Committee
1986—1993	Governor, People's Government Gansu Province
1983—1986	Deputy Secretary, CCP, Provincial Committee Gansu Province
1960	Joined, CCP

Preceded by Chen Guangyi	Governor of Gansu; 1986–1993	Succeeded by Yan Haiwang
