= Li Lecheng =

Chinese politician (born 1965)

- 李乐成
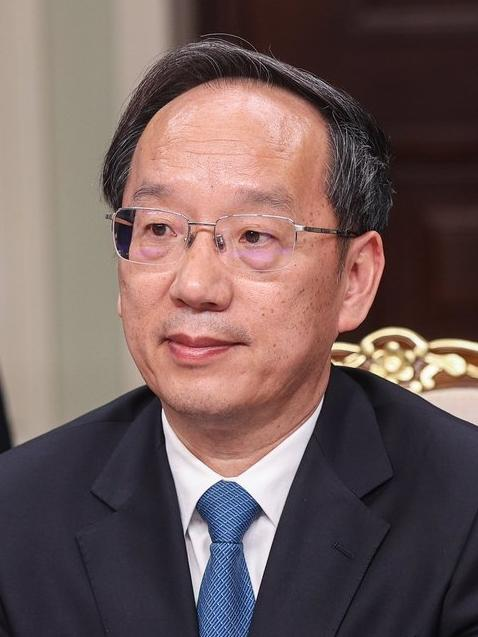
- Li in 2024

Party Secretary of Anhui
- Incumbent
- Assumed office 23 September 2026
- Deputy: Wang Dongwei (Acting Governor); Shan Xiangqian
- Preceded by: Liang Yanshun

Minister of Industry and Information Technology
- In office 30 April 2025 – 6 November 2026
- Premier: Li Qiang
- Preceded by: Jin Zhuanglong
- Succeeded by: Vacant

Governor of Liaoning
- In office 20 October 2021 – 28 February 2025
- Party Secretary: Zhang Guoqing; Hao Peng
- Preceded by: Liu Ning
- Succeeded by: Wang Xinwei

Personal details
- Born: 27 March 1965 (age 61) Jianli County, Hubei, China
- Party: Chinese Communist Party (since 1991)
- Education: Huazhong University of Science and Technology

Chinese name
- Simplified Chinese: 李乐成
- Traditional Chinese: 李樂成
Transcriptions
Standard Mandarin
- Hanyu Pinyin: Lǐ Lèchéng

Li Lecheng (Chinese: 李乐成; born 27 March 1965) is a Chinese politician who is the current Party Secretary of Anhui. Previously he served as Minister of Industry and Information Technology from April 2025 to November 2026 and as governor of Liaoning from October 2021 to February 2025.

== Biography ==
=== Early years and Hubei ===
Li was born in Jianli County, Hubei, on 27 March 1965. In 1980, he entered Huazhong Institute of Technology (now Huazhong University of Science and Technology), majoring in mechanical manufacturing process equipment and automation, where he graduated in 1984.

Li served in several posts at Shayang Machinery Factory in Jingmen since August 1984, including technician, director of Technology Section, director of Technology Development Office, deputy factory director, and factory director. He joined the Chinese Communist Party (CCP) in December 1991. He served as deputy general manager of Jingmen Machinery Metallurgical Industry Corporation in December 1996, and soon promoted to the general manager position in February 1998. In November 2000, he became vice chairman of Hubei Dongguang Group Co., Ltd., rising to chairman the next year.

Li got involved in politics in January 2002, when he was admitted to member of the standing committee of the CCP Jingmen Municipal Committee, the city's top authority. He was appointed president of Jingmen Trade Union Federation in February 2002, concurrently serving as head of Organization Department since September 2003. In January 2007, he was elevated to vice mayor. In February 2008, he was promoted to acting mayor of Yichang, confirmed in March of that same year. In March 2013, he was appointed director of Hubei Provincial Development and Reform Commission, he remained in that position until February 2017, when he was transferred to Xiangyang and appointed party secretary, the top political position in the city. In June 2017, he was promoted to member of the CCP Provincial Standing Committee of Hubei, the province's top authority. He rose to become executive vice governor of Hubei in January 2021.

=== Liaoning ===
On 20 October 2021, he was promoted again to become acting governor of Liaoning, replacing Liu Ning, who was then appointed as the CCP Committee Secretary of Guangxi. He officially engaged in the governor of Liaoning in early 2022.

=== Ministry of Industry and Information Technology ===
On 28 February 2025, Li was appointed as the Party Secretary of the Ministry of Industry and Information Technology, replacing Jin Zhuanglong. He officially took the office of the Minister of Industry and Information Technology on 30 April 2025.

=== Anhui ===
On 23 September 2026, Li was appointed as the Party Secretary of Anhui.

Party political offices
Preceded by Ren Zhenhe	Communist Party Secretary of Xiangyang; 2017–2021	Succeeded by Ma Xuming
Preceded by Liang Yanshun	Party Secretary of Anhui; 2026-	Incumbent
Government offices
Preceded by Guo Youming	Mayor of Yichang; 2008–2013	Succeeded by Ma Xuming
Preceded by Wang Jianming	Director of Hubei Provincial Development and Reform Commission; 2013–2017	Succeeded by Liu Xiaoming
Preceded by Huang Chuping	Executive Vice Governor of Hubei; January–November 2021	Succeeded by Dong Weimin
Preceded by Liu Ning	Governor of Liaoning; 2021–2025	Succeeded by Wang Xinwei
Preceded by Jin Zhuanglong	Minister of Industry and Information Technology; 2025–2026	Succeeded by Vacant
