= Ren Zhongyi =

Chinese politician (1914–2005)

Ren Zhongyi (Chinese: 任仲夷; pinyin: Rén Zhòngyí; September 1914 – November 15, 2005) was a Chinese politician.

== Biography ==
Ren was born in Wei County, Handan, Hebei province. He was a leader in China's reform period since the late 1970s. He is widely regarded as the bold reformer who led Guangdong to come 'one step ahead' in China's reform. He served as the First Communist Party secretary of Harbin, Heilongjiang (1956–1977), the First Party Secretary of Liaoning province (1977–1980), and the First Party Secretary of Guangdong (1980–1985).

After he retired, Ren Zhongyi remained active in public affairs and was bold and outspoken. He was amongst a few influential people in China who still publicly advocated political reform. One example is his iconoclastic article in the May 5, 2000 issue of the Guangdong-based national newspaper Southern Weekly, which sought to re-interpret Deng Xiaoping's theory of the Four Cardinal Principles (upholding the socialist path; upholding the people's democratic dictatorship; upholding the leadership of the Communist Party and upholding Marxist Leninsm Mao Zedong Thought) in order to create more room for democratic reforms. For example, on the principle of upholding the leadership of the Communist Party, he wrote:

Improving the leadership of the Party means establishing a system that can effectively supervise and constrain the Party. Deng Xiaoping thought that the absence of constraints on the Party was dangerous. The Party needs to be led well but it needs to be supervised as well.

I believe this is a fundamental issue that needs to be addressed. Absolute power corrupts absolutely. The Communist Party is no exception to that rule. The Communist Party supervising itself is like having the left hand supervise the right hand. That just won't do. The Party needs to be supervised not just by the Party but by the people, the democratic party groupings and by independent persons. Not only must it be subject to the supervision of society and public opinion, it must be constrained by law as well.

Due to the degree of reputation and influence that he had, the Party leaders could only tolerate and to some extent accommodate his views, whilst at the same time using other means (such as sacking the editors who published his views in their magazines) to minimise the effect of his speeches.

Ren Zhongyi was a pragmatic politician, instead of being an ideologue attached to Marxism-Leninism and communism. This is in fact true for many reformers at the time, such as Deng Xiaoping, Hu Yaobang, Zhao Ziyang, Wan Li, Xiang Nan etc.

Chen Shiji, former head of the PLA Air Force Publicity Department of the Guangzhou Military District, in his 2009 article "Unforgettable Ren Zhongyi" called this 2000 article in Southern Weekend an example of Ren's clear thinking, determination to put to rest the remnants of Cultural Revolution thinking, and his conviction that Marxism must allow for change and progress.

== Family ==
One of Ren Zhongyi's grandsons, Ren Yi, a Harvard Kennedy School alumnus, is a Chinese blogger who writes under the name of Chairman Rabbit.

Government offices
Preceded by Zeng Shaoshan	Governor of Liaoning; 1978	Succeeded by Chen Puru
Preceded by Zeng Shaoshan	Party Secretary of Liaoning; 1978–1980	Succeeded by Guo Feng
Preceded by Xi Zhongxun	Party Secretary of Guangdong; 1980–1985	Succeeded by Lin Ruo
