= Party Secretary of Guangdong =

Provincial government position in China

Secretary of the Guangdong Provincial Committee of the Chinese Communist Party
- 中国共产党广东省委员会书记
- Emblem of the Chinese Communist Party

- Flag of the Chinese Communist Party

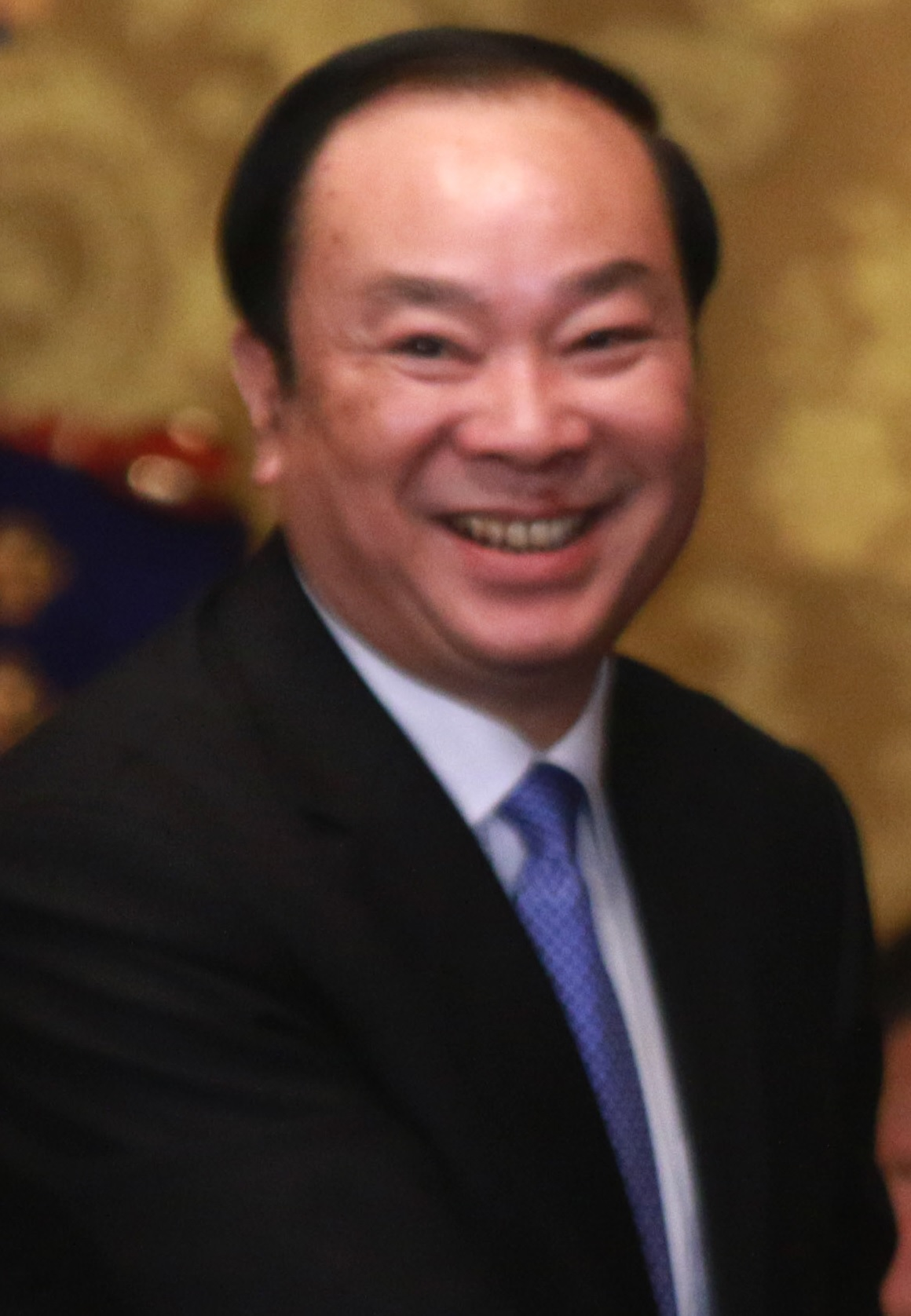
- Incumbent; Huang Kunming since 28 October 2022
- Guangdong Provincial Committee of the Chinese Communist Party
- Type: Party Committee Secretary
- Status: Provincial and ministerial-level official
- Member of: Guangdong Provincial Standing Committee
- Nominator: Central Committee
- Appointer: Guangdong Provincial Committee Central Committee
- Inaugural holder: Ye Jianying
- Formation: August 1949
- Deputy: Deputy Secretary; Secretary-General

The secretary of the Guangdong Provincial Committee of the Chinese Communist Party is the leader of the Guangdong Provincial Committee of the Chinese Communist Party (CCP). As the CCP is the sole ruling party of the People's Republic of China (PRC), the secretary is the highest ranking post in Guangdong.

The secretary is officially appointed by the CCP Central Committee based on the recommendation of the CCP Organization Department, which is then approved by the Politburo and its Standing Committee. The secretary can be also appointed by a plenary meeting of the Guangdong Provincial Committee, but the candidate must be the same as the one approved by the central government. The secretary leads the Standing Committee of the Guangdong Provincial Committee, and since at least 2007, the secretary has consistently been a member of the CCP Politburo. The secretary leads the work of the Provincial Committee and its Standing Committee. The secretary is outranks the governor, who is generally the deputy secretary of the committee.

The current secretary is Huang Kunming, a member of the CCP Politburo, who took office on 28 October 2022.

== List of party secretaries ==
=== First Secretary of the Southern China Bureau ===
No.	Portrait	Name	Took office	Left office
1	Ye Jianying (叶剑英)	Ye Jianying (叶剑英)	August 1949	July 1955

=== Secretary of the Provincial Committee ===
No.	Portrait	Name	Took office	Left office
1	Tao Zhu (陶铸)	Tao Zhu (陶铸)	July 1955	February 1965
2	Zhao Ziyang (赵紫阳)	Zhao Ziyang (赵紫阳)	February 1965	March 1967

=== Chair of the Provincial Revolutionary Committee ===
No.	Portrait	Name	Took office	Left office
1	Huang Yongsheng (黄永胜)	Huang Yongsheng (黄永胜)	February 1968	November 1969
2	Liu Xingyuan (刘兴元)	Liu Xingyuan (刘兴元)	November 1969	December 1972
3	Ding Sheng (丁盛)	Ding Sheng (丁盛)	December 1972	December 1973

=== First Secretary of the Provincial Committee ===
No.	Portrait	Name	Took office	Left office
1	Zhao Ziyang (赵紫阳)	Zhao Ziyang (赵紫阳)	April 1974	October 1975
2	Wei Guoqing (韦国清)	Wei Guoqing (韦国清)	October 1975	December 1978
3	Xi Zhongxun (习仲勋)	Xi Zhongxun (习仲勋)	December 1978	November 1980
4	Ren Zhongyi (任仲夷)	Ren Zhongyi (任仲夷)	November 1980	July 1985

=== Secretary of the Provincial Committee ===
No.	Portrait	Name	Took office	Left office
3	Lin Ruo (林若)	Lin Ruo (林若)	July 1985	January 1991
4	Xie Fei (谢非)	Xie Fei (谢非)	January 1991	March 1998
5	Li Changchun (李长春)	Li Changchun (李长春)	March 1998	November 2002
6	Zhang Dejiang (张德江)	Zhang Dejiang (张德江)	December 24, 2002	December 1, 2007
7	Wang Yang (汪洋)	Wang Yang (汪洋)	December 1, 2007	December 18, 2012
8	Hu Chunhua (胡春华)	Hu Chunhua (胡春华)	December 28, 2012	October 28, 2017
9	Li Xi (李希)	Li Xi (李希)	October 28, 2017	October 18, 2022
10	Huang Kunming (黄坤明)	Huang Kunming (黄坤明)	October 28, 2022	incumbent
