= Wang Min (politician, born 1950) =

Chinese politician (born 1950)

- 王珉

Party Secretary of Liaoning
- In office November 2009 – May 2015
- Preceded by: Zhang Wenyue
- Succeeded by: Li Xi

Party Secretary of Jilin
- In office December 2006 – November 2009
- Preceded by: Wang Yunkun
- Succeeded by: Sun Zhengcai

Governor of Jilin
- In office October 2004 – December 2006
- Preceded by: Hong Hu
- Succeeded by: Han Changfu

Personal details
- Born: March 1950 (age 76) Huainan, Anhui, China
- Party: Chinese Communist Party (expelled)
- Education: Nanjing University of Aeronautics and Astronautics

Wang Min (Chinese: 王珉; born March 1950) is a former politician of the People's Republic of China. He successively served as Party Secretary of Liaoning, Party Secretary and Governor of Jilin, and Vice Governor of Jiangsu. Once considered a promising future leader in the Communist Party, Wang retired from his provincial leadership positions in 2015, before coming under investigation for corruption in 2016. He was sentenced to life in prison upon being convicted on charges of bribery and dereliction of duty.

A native of Huainan, Anhui province, Wang has a doctoral degree in Engineering in Machinery Manufacturing from Nanjing University of Aeronautics and Astronautics and was a professor and vice president of the university.

== Career ==
Starting in September 1968 Wang Min was one of the many sent-down youths sent down to the countryside and then worked in a factory during the Cultural Revolution. Later he studied at Nanjing Institute of Aeronautics (since renamed Nanjing University of Aeronautics and Astronautics) where he obtained a Ph.D. He stayed at the university as a professor, and eventually became its vice president.

Wang Min joined the Chinese Communist Party in July 1985. In July 1994, he was transferred from the university to the provincial government of Jiangsu as an assistant governor. In December 1996, he was appointed as a deputy governor of Jiangsu. In May 2002, he became the Communist Party Chief of the city of Suzhou.

In October 2004, Wang Min was transferred to Jilin province in Northeast China, where he took the positions of deputy party chief, deputy governor, and acting governor. On 29 January 2005, he was elected Governor of Jilin province. In December 2006, he was promoted to the position of Communist Party Chief of Jilin and resigned as governor.

In November 2009, Wang was transferred from Jilin to neighbouring Liaoning province to become its Party Chief. He was succeeded by Sun Zhengcai as the Party Chief of Jilin. After reaching the age of 65, Wang Min was replaced by Governor Li Xi as Party Secretary of Liaoning in May 2015. Subsequently, Wang was named a deputy chair of the National People's Congress Education, Science, Culture and Public Health Committee.

Wang was a member of the 17th and the 18th Central Committees of the Chinese Communist Party.

== Investigation ==
On March 4, 2016, Wang Min was placed under investigation by the Central Commission for Discipline Inspection for "serious discipline violations." He was expelled from the Communist Party on August 10, 2016, for dereliction of duty and negligence during a vote-buying scandal, violating the Eight-point Regulation and for bribery. It was said that the cases of Wang Yang and Su Hongzhang had both involved Wang Min in some capacity. On August 4, 2017, Wang was sentenced to life in prison for taking bribes worth 146 million yuan, plundering the public fund worth 1 million yuan for personal use and dereliction of duty in Luoyang.

Party political offices
Preceded by Zhang Wenyue	Party Secretary of Liaoning; 2009–2015	Succeeded by Li Xi
Preceded by Wang Yunkun	Party Secretary of Jilin; 2006–2009	Succeeded by Sun Zhengcai
Government offices
Preceded by Hong Hu	Governor of Jilin; 2004–2006	Succeeded by Han Changfu
