= Yan Haiwang =

Chinese politician

Yan Haiwang (born 1939) is a Chinese politician. He was born in Zhengzhou, Henan Province and educated in Harbin, Heilongjiang Province. He was governor of Gansu from January to September 1993 and Chinese Communist Party Committee Secretary of Gansu from September 1993 to 1998. He was an alternate member of the 14th Central Committee of the Chinese Communist Party (1992–1997) and a full member of the 15th Central Committee of the Chinese Communist Party (1997–2002) and 16th Central Committee of the Chinese Communist Party (2002–2007). He was a delegate to the 8th National People's Congress (1993–1998) and 9th National People's Congress (1998–2003). He was a member of the 10th Chinese People's Political Consultative Conference (March 2003–March 2008).

Preceded by Jia Zhijie	Governor of Gansu; January–September 1993	Succeeded by Zhang Wule
Preceded by Gu Jinchi	Party Secretary of Gansu; September 1993 – 1998	Succeeded by Sun Ying
