= Xu Kunlin =

Chinese politician (born 1965)

- 许昆林
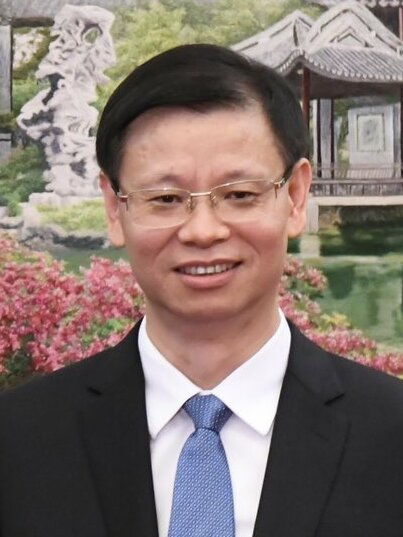
- Xu in 2023

Party Secretary of Liaoning
- Incumbent
- Assumed office 30 September 2025
- Deputy: Wang Xinwei (governor)
- Preceded by: Hao Peng

Governor of Jiangsu
- In office 19 October 2021 – 9 October 2025
- Party Secretary: Wu Zhenglong; Xin Changxing
- Preceded by: Wu Zhenglong
- Succeeded by: Liu Xiaotao

Personal details
- Born: May 1965 (age 61) Yongchun County, Fujian, China
- Party: Chinese Communist Party
- Education: Zhejiang Gongshang University

Chinese name
- Simplified Chinese: 许昆林
- Traditional Chinese: 許昆林
Transcriptions
Standard Mandarin
- Hanyu Pinyin: Xǔ Kūnlín
Southern Min
- Hokkien POJ: Khó͘ Khun-lîm

Xu Kunlin (Chinese: 许昆林; Pe̍h-ōe-jī: Khó͘ Khun-lîm; born May 1965) is a Chinese politician who is the current Party Secretary of Liaoning, in office since 30 September 2025. Previously he served as the governor of Jiangsu, and the Chinese Communist Party Committee Secretary of Suzhou, the largest city in Jiangsu.

== Biography ==
Xu was born in Yongchun County, Fujian, in May 1965. In 1980, he enrolled in Hangzhou Institute of Commerce (now Zhejiang Gongshang University), majoring in planning statistics, where he graduated in 1984.

After university, in August 1984, he was dispatched to State Administration of commodity Prices (now National Development and Reform Commission), where he worked successively as director of the Department of Price Supervision, director of the Department of Fixed Assets Investment, and deputy secretary-general.

In March 2017, he took office of vice mayor of Shanghai, one of the four direct-administered municipalities of China and one of China's economic centers.

In September 2020, he was transferred to the neighboring Jiangsu province and appointed party secretary of Suzhou, the top political position in the city. And he was admitted to member of the standing committee of the CCP Jiangsu Provincial Committee, the province's top authority. On 19 October 2021, he was promoted to acting governor of Jiangsu, replacing Wu Zhenglong.

In September 2025, Xu was appointed as the Party Secretary of Liaoning.

Party political offices
Preceded by Lan Shaomin	Communist Party Secretary of Suzhou; 2020–2021	Succeeded by Cao Lubao
Preceded by Hao Peng	Party Secretary of Liaoning; 2025–present	Incumbent
Government offices
Preceded by Wu Zhenglong	Governor of Jiangsu; 2021–2025	Succeeded by Liu Xiaotao
