= Zeng Shaoshan =

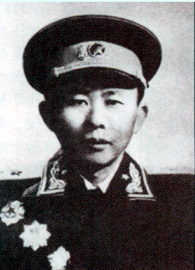
Zeng Shaoshan

Zeng Shaoshan (Chinese: 曾绍山; December 1914 – January 26, 1995) was a People's Liberation Army lieutenant general. He was born in Jinzhai County, Anhui Province. He joined the Chinese Communist Party in 1933 and was a member of the Chinese Workers' and Peasants' Red Army. He later joined the Eighth Route Army during the Second Sino-Japanese War. He was the Chinese Communist Party Committee Secretary and Governor of Liaoning Province.

Government offices
Preceded by Chen Xilian	Communist Party Chief and Governor of Liaoning	Succeeded by Ren Zhongyi
