= Shenmu =

Shenmu 神木市
- County-level city
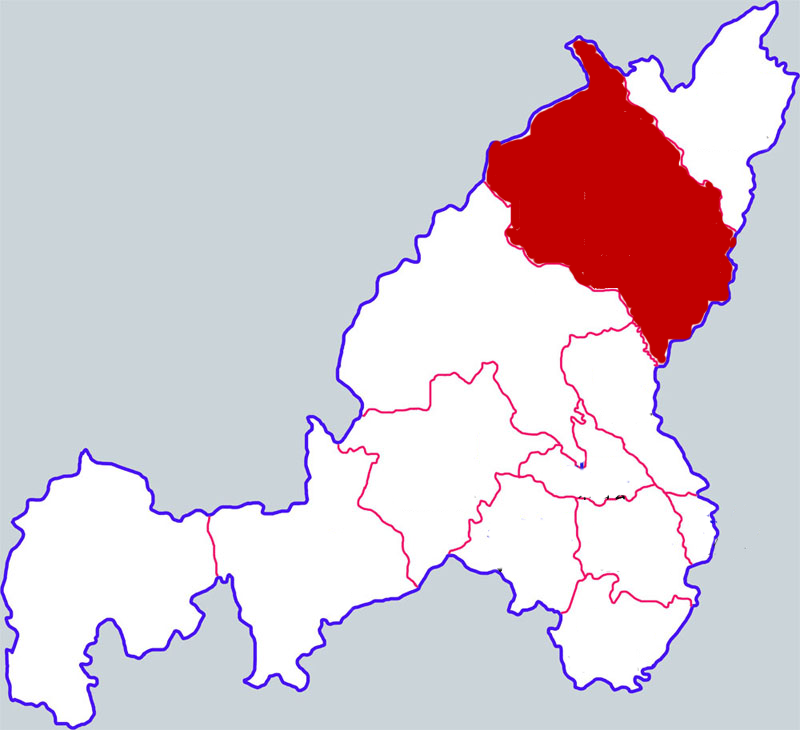
- Shenmu in Yulin

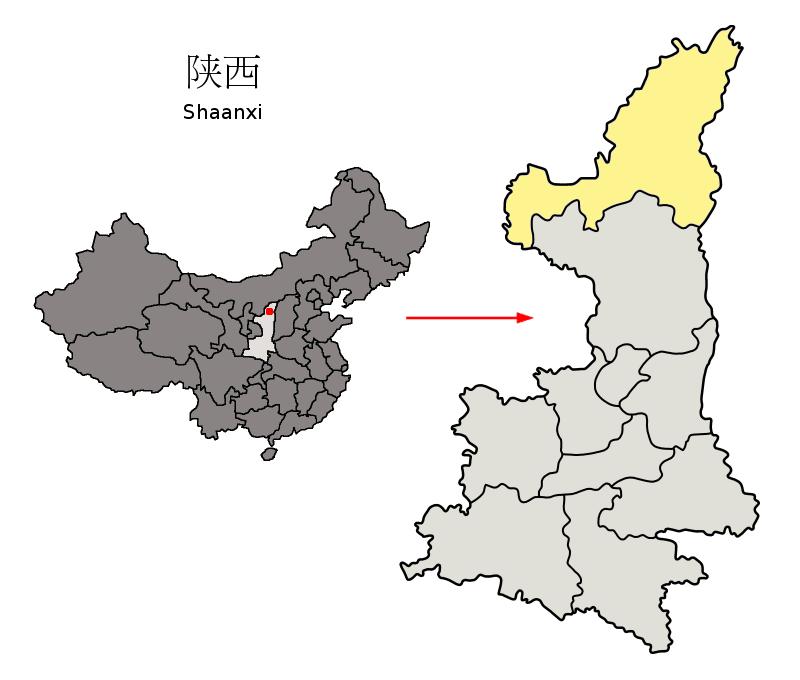
- Yulin in Shaanxi
- Coordinates: 38°49′10″N 110°29′23″E
- Country: People's Republic of China
- Province: Shaanxi
- Prefecture-level city: Yulin

Area
  - Total: 7,635 km^{2} (2,948 sq mi)

Population (2018)
  - Total: 485,000
  - Density: 63.5/km^{2} (165/sq mi)
- Time zone: UTC+8 (China Standard)
- Postal Code: 719300
- Website: www.sxsm.com.cn

Shenmu (Chinese: 神木; pinyin: Shénmù; lit. 'Divine Trees') is a county-level city in the north of Shaanxi province, China, bordering Inner Mongolia to the northwest and Shanxi province, across the Yellow River, to the southeast. Under the administration of Yulin City, Shenmu is endowed with plentiful resources, especially coal, such as the three earth sovereigns coal fields of Huojitu, Yujialiang and Shagoupen which makes it the richest county in Shaanxi. Shenmu county is also known for the Shimao archaeological site, the largest Neolithic settlement in China, and a city with evidence of trade networks stretching from the Eurasian Steppe to Southern China.

== Etymology ==
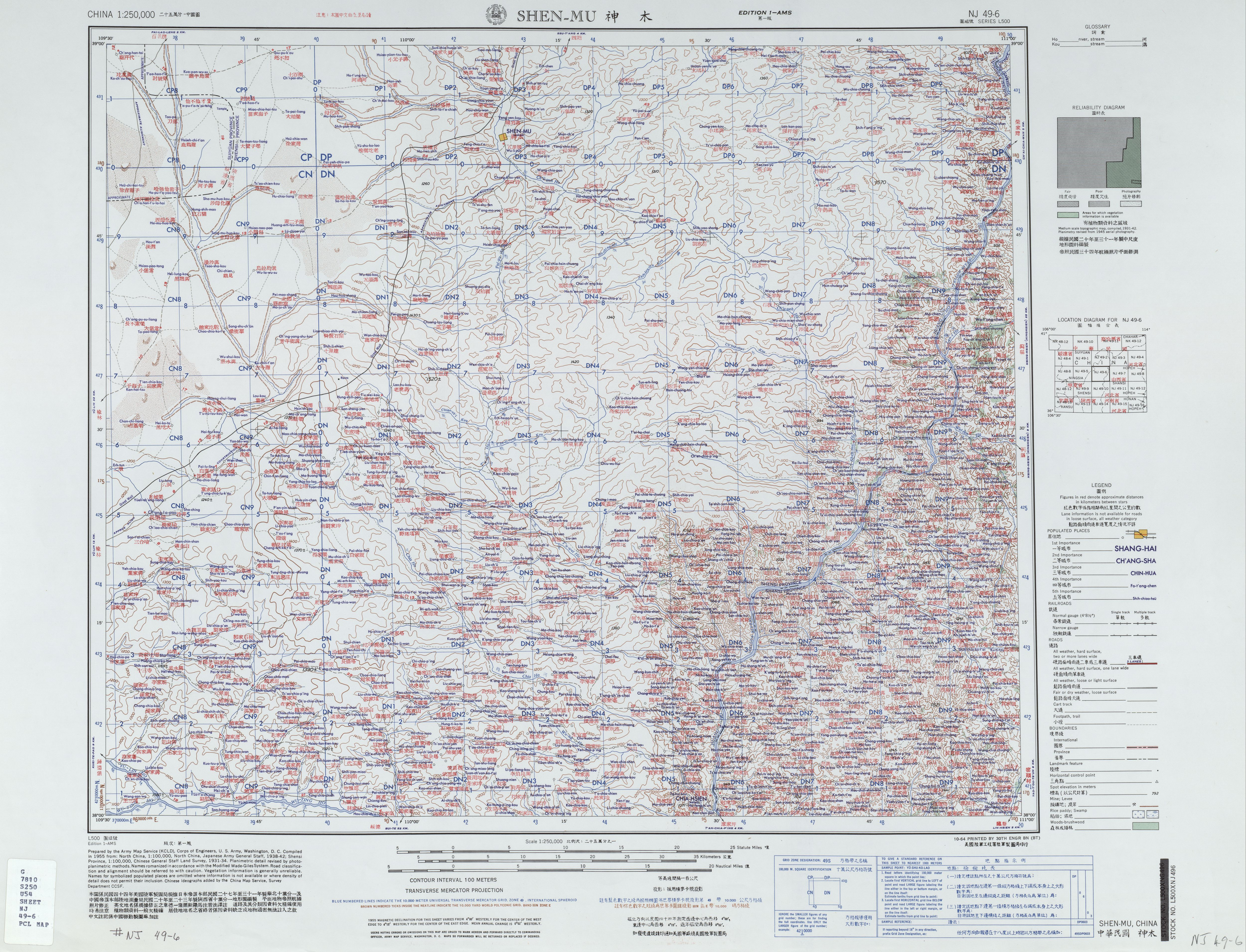
Map including Shenmu (labeled as SHEN-MU (walled) 神木) (AMS, 1955)

The toponym of city can trace its history back to the Song dynasty. There were three giant pine trees, which were said to be planted since Tang dynasty, close to the fort located at Yangjiacheng. The fort was named Shenmu Zhai (神木寨; [Fort of Divine Trees]). Then the county administering the area around the fort was established in 1269, and the toponym stuck.

=== Industrial zones ===
Shenmu has a large coalfield which should meet future demands for China's power growth.

== Administrative divisions ==
As of 2019, Shenmu City is divided to 6 subdistricts and 14 towns.

Subdistricts

- Binhexinqu Subdistrict (滨河新区街道)
- Xisha Subdistrict (西沙街道)
- Linzhou Subdistrict (麟州街道)
- Yingbinlu Subdistrict (迎宾路街道)
- Yongxing Subdistrict (永兴街道)
- Xigou Subdistrict (西沟街道)

Towns

- Gaojiabao (高家堡镇)
- Dianta (店塔镇)
- Sunjiacha (孙家岔镇)
- Daliuta (大柳塔镇)
- Huashiya (花石崖镇)
- Zhongji (中鸡镇)
- Hejiachuan (贺家川镇)
- Erlintu (尔林兔镇)
- Wan (万镇)
- Dabaodang (大保当镇)
- Ma (马镇)
- Langanbao (栏杆堡镇)
- Shamao (沙峁镇)
- Jinjie (锦界镇)

== Climate ==
Climate data for Shenmu, elevation 941 m (3,087 ft), (1991–2020 normals, extremes 1981–2010)
Month	Jan	Feb	Mar	Apr	May	Jun	Jul	Aug	Sep	Oct	Nov	Dec	Year
Record high °C (°F)	11.2 (52.2)	18.8 (65.8)	28.7 (83.7)	35.7 (96.3)	36.7 (98.1)	41.2 (106.2)	39.6 (103.3)	37.0 (98.6)	36.4 (97.5)	29.1 (84.4)	22.5 (72.5)	14.2 (57.6)	41.2 (106.2)
Mean daily maximum °C (°F)	−0.7 (30.7)	5.1 (41.2)	11.7 (53.1)	20.0 (68.0)	25.7 (78.3)	30.1 (86.2)	31.3 (88.3)	28.9 (84.0)	24.0 (75.2)	17.4 (63.3)	8.9 (48.0)	1.3 (34.3)	17.0 (62.5)
Daily mean °C (°F)	−8.5 (16.7)	−2.8 (27.0)	4.0 (39.2)	12.0 (53.6)	18.2 (64.8)	23 (73)	24.7 (76.5)	22.4 (72.3)	16.9 (62.4)	9.6 (49.3)	1.4 (34.5)	−5.9 (21.4)	9.6 (49.2)
Mean daily minimum °C (°F)	−14.4 (6.1)	−8.9 (16.0)	−2.2 (28.0)	4.9 (40.8)	10.9 (51.6)	16.2 (61.2)	19.0 (66.2)	17.4 (63.3)	11.5 (52.7)	4.0 (39.2)	−3.9 (25.0)	−11.1 (12.0)	3.6 (38.5)
Record low °C (°F)	−29.0 (−20.2)	−23.1 (−9.6)	−17.2 (1.0)	−6.8 (19.8)	−1.9 (28.6)	5.2 (41.4)	9.6 (49.3)	8.1 (46.6)	−2.1 (28.2)	−8.2 (17.2)	−18.9 (−2.0)	−26.7 (−16.1)	−29.0 (−20.2)
Average precipitation mm (inches)	3.0 (0.12)	3.5 (0.14)	10.3 (0.41)	16.8 (0.66)	33.8 (1.33)	43.1 (1.70)	105.6 (4.16)	98.8 (3.89)	57.0 (2.24)	21.4 (0.84)	10.4 (0.41)	2.5 (0.10)	406.2 (16)
Average precipitation days (≥ 0.1 mm)	2.1	2.5	3.8	4.1	7.1	8.9	11.0	10.9	8.9	5.4	3.0	1.9	69.6
Average snowy days	3.7	3.2	2.4	0.5	0	0	0	0	0	0.2	1.7	3.0	14.7
Average relative humidity (%)	54	47	42	37	41	47	58	66	65	61	56	53	52
Mean monthly sunshine hours	197.8	200.4	230.7	254.3	278.0	268.1	251.0	230.4	209.2	215.6	199.5	188.2	2,723.2
Percentage possible sunshine	65	66	62	64	63	60	56	55	57	63	67	64	62
Source: China Meteorological Administration
