= Liaoning Provincial Committee of the Chinese Communist Party =

Liaoning Provincial Committee of the Chinese Communist Party 中国共产党辽宁省委员会

Overview
- Type: Highest decision-making organ when Liaoning Provincial Congress is not in session.
- Elected by: Liaoning Provincial Congress
- Length of term: Five years
- Term limits: None
- First convocation: August 1, 1954; 71 years ago

Leadership
- Secretary: Xu Kunlin
- Executive organ: Standing Committee
- Inspection organ: Commission for Discipline Inspection

Liaoning Provincial Committee of the Chinese Communist Party
- Simplified Chinese: 中国共产党辽宁省委员会
- Traditional Chinese: 中國共產黨遼寧省委員會
Transcriptions
Standard Mandarin
- Hanyu Pinyin: Zhōngguó Gòngchǎndǎng Liáoníngshěng Wěiyuánhuì

Abbreviation
- Simplified Chinese: 中共辽宁省委
- Traditional Chinese: 中共遼寧省委
- Literal meaning: CCP Liaoning Provincial Committee
Transcriptions
Standard Mandarin
- Hanyu Pinyin: Zhōnggòng Liáoníngshěng Wěi

The Liaoning Provincial Committee of the Chinese Communist Party is the provincial committee of the Chinese Communist Party (CCP) in Liaoning, China, and the province's top authority. The CCP committee secretary is the highest ranking post in the province.

== Organizations ==
The organization of the Liaoning Provincial Committee includes:

- General Office

=== Functional Departments ===
- Organization Department
- Publicity Department
- United Front Work Department
- Political and Legal Affairs Commission
- Social Work Department
- Commission for Discipline Inspection
- Supervisory Commission

=== Offices ===
- Policy Research Office
- Office of the Cyberspace Affairs Commission
- Office of the Foreign Affairs Commission
- Office of the Deepening Reform Commission
- Office of the Institutional Organization Commission
- Office of the Military-civilian Fusion Development Committee
- Taiwan Work Office
- Office of the Leading Group for Inspection Work
- Bureau of Veteran Cadres

=== Dispatched institutions ===
- Working Committee of the Organs Directly Affiliated to the Liaoning Provincial Committee

=== Organizations directly under the Committee ===
- Liaoning Party School
- Liaoning Daily Newspaper Group
- Liaoning Institute of Socialism
- Party History Research Office
- Liaoning Provincial Archives
- Lecturer Group

=== Organization managed by the work organization ===
- Confidential Bureau

== Leadership ==
=== Heads of the Organization Department ===
Name (English)	Name (Chinese)	Tenure begins	Tenure ends	Note
Jiang Tianbao	蒋天宝	June 2023		

=== Heads of the Publicity Department ===
Name (English)	Name (Chinese)	Tenure begins	Tenure ends	Note
Jin Guowei	靳国卫	September 2024		

=== Secretaries of the Political and Legal Affairs Commission ===
Name (English)	Name (Chinese)	Tenure begins	Tenure ends	Note
Huo Bugang	霍步刚	March 2024		

=== Heads of the United Front Work Department ===
Name (English)	Name (Chinese)	Tenure begins	Tenure ends	Note
Sui Qing	隋青	15 April 2024		

== See also ==
- Politics of Liaoning
