= Du Zheheng =

Chinese politician

Du Zheheng (Chinese: 杜者蘅) (1910–1975) was a People's Republic of China politician. He was born in Kaiyuan, Liaoning. In 1936, after attending Northeastern University, he went to Xi'an to participate in the Xi'an Incident. In 1937, he joined the Chinese Communist Party. During the Second Sino-Japanese War, he was a member of the Eighth Route Army, active in Hebei, Shanxi, Shandong and Henan Provinces. He was Secretary of Liaobei Province and vice-chairman of Liaodong (also called Andong Province). In 1950, he joined the People's Volunteer Army in the Korean War. Upon his return to China, he was agricultural minister for the Northeast Greater Administrative Area. In 1954, upon the dissolution of the greater administrative areas, he was made the 1st governor of his home province.

Preceded by new office	Governor of Liaoning	Succeeded by Huang Oudong
