= Wang Xinwei =

Chinese politician

- 王新伟

Governor of Liaoning
- Incumbent
- Assumed office March 1, 2025
- Preceded by: Li Lecheng

Communist Party Secretary of Shenyang
- In office October 31, 2021 – March 1, 2025
- Preceded by: Zhang Lei
- Succeeded by: Huo Bugang

Mayor of Shenyang
- In office January 22, 2021 – October 31, 2021
- Preceded by: Jiang Youwei
- Succeeded by: Lu Zhicheng

Vice Governor of Henan
- In office March 31, 2020 – April 2, 2021

Mayor of Zhengzhou
- In office September 25, 2018 – December 31, 2020
- Preceded by: Wang Zhanying
- Succeeded by: Hou Hong

Mayor of Anyang
- In office December 17, 2015 – September 25, 2018
- Preceded by: Ma Linqing
- Succeeded by: Jin Lei

Personal details
- Born: August 1967 (age 59) Baofeng, Henan, China
- Party: Chinese Communist Party
- Education: Zhejiang University

Wang Xinwei (Chinese: 王新伟; born August 1967) is a Chinese politician and member of the Chinese Communist Party (CCP), who is currently serving as the Governor of Liaoning as of March 2025. Previously, he served as CCP committee secretary and mayor of Shenyang from 2021 to 2025, and mayor of Zhengzhou (2018–2020) and Anyang (2015–2018).

== Early life and education ==
Wang was born in August 1967 in Baofeng County in Pingdingshan, Henan. In 1984, after completing his high school education, he took gaokao and was admitted for undergraduate studies at the Department of Electrical Machinery at Zhejiang University in September of that year. He graduated in July 1988.

After completing his undergraduate studies, he continued with full-time postgraduate education in electrical engineering at Zhejiang University and received his master's degree in electrical engineering theory in September 1991. He joined the Chinese Communist Party (CCP) in October 1985 while studying at Zhejiang University.

== Political career ==
=== Henan ===
In September 1991, after completing his master's program at Zhejiang University, Wang returned to Henan and began working at the Pingdingshan Municipal Tax Bureau. He served as a machinery and information technology officer, holding the positions of Director of the Computer Center and Director of the Tax Information Center within the bureau. In September 1994, he was transferred to the CCP Pingdingshan Municipal Committee, serving as deputy director of the Office of Intelligence under the Organization Department, where he was responsible for IT-related work. He was later appointed Director of the Municipal Cadre Examination Center, holding a sub-prefectural cadre rank from September 1997. During this period, he was also assigned to Ruzhou, where he concurrently served as Deputy Party Secretary of the place from 1996 to 1997.

In February 2000, he was transferred to Zhanhe District, where he served as a member of the District Standing Committee and Deputy District Governor. After more than two years, he was transferred to Xinhua District to serve as CCP deputy committee secretary and District Governor. From September to December 2004, he concurrently held the role of Assistant to the Mayor of Linhai in Zhejiang, as part of a local cadre exchange program. In February 2006, he was again transferred—this time to Wugang, a county-level city under Pingdingshan, where he served for two years as Deputy Party Secretary and Mayor.

By October 2008, he was promoted to the Henan Provincial People's Government, where he assumed the position of deputy director of the Department of Water Resources. He was then sent to Xinjiang as part of the province's support mission, where he served as Deputy Commander of the 'Henan Xinjiang Assistance Frontline Headquarters', and later promoted to Commander in September 2012. Concurrently, he was Deputy Division Commander of the 13th Agricultural Division of the Xinjiang Production and Construction Corps (XPCC), and CCP deputy committee secretary of the Hami from 2012 to 2014. In February 2014, Wang was transferred to the prefecture-level city of Anyang, where he served as a member of the Standing Committee of the Municipal Party Committee and Deputy Mayor, later becoming CCP deputy committee secretary and mayor by the end of 2015. In September 2018, he was appointed CCP deputy committee secretary and mayor of Zhengzhou, the provincial capital of Henan. In March 2020, he was promoted to Vice Governor of Henan. During his tenure as mayor of Zhengzhou, he organized the 2020 Yangtze River Delta regional cooperation meeting in Shanghai where 37 projects worth 106.8 billion yuan were signed, to boost investment and development. Wang was also elected as a Deputy to the 13th National People's Congress, serving the 2018–2023 term.

=== Liaoning ===
In January 2021, Wang was transferred to Liaoning, where he was appointed Deputy Party Secretary of Shenyang, Secretary of the Party Leadership Group, and Mayor of Shenyang, the provincial capital. These roles carried a sub-provincial administrative rank. Following the third plenary session of the 20th CCP Central Committee, Wang emphasized aligning with national modernization goals.

Subsequently, in October 2021, he was elected to the Standing Committee of the Liaoning Provincial Party Committee and assigned the position of Party Secretary of Shenyang. At the 20th National Congress of the Chinese Communist Party, held in late 2022, he participated as a delegate from the Liaoning. During the congress's internal elections, he was elected as an alternate member of the 20th Central Committee of the Chinese Communist Party. In March 2024, he was promoted to deputy secretary of the Liaoning Provincial Committee of the CCP. In March 2025, he was appointed vice governor and then acting governor of Liaoning, succeeding Li Lecheng who was appointed as the Minister of Industry and Information Technology. On the same month, he was officially elected as governor of the Liaoning.

On 11 June 2025, he hosted the 15th general assembly of the Association of North East Asia Regional Governments, an independent cooperative organization that strives to achieve mutual development and cooperative exchange among regional governments in Northeast Asia. Representatives from 28 regional governments across Japan, South Korea, Mongolia, Russia, Kyrgyzstan, Kazakhstan, and China attended the event.

Government offices
Preceded by Li Lecheng	Governor of Liaoning; 2025-present	Incumbent
Preceded by Jiang Youwei	Mayor of Shenyang; 2021-2021	Succeeded by Lu Zhicheng
Preceded by Wang Zhanying	Mayor of Zhengzhou; 2018-2020	Succeeded by Hou Hong
Preceded by Ma Lingqing	Mayor of Anyang; 2015-2018	Succeeded by Jin Lei
Party political offices
Preceded by Zhang Lei	Communist Party Secretary of Shenyang; 2021–2025	Succeeded by Huo Bugang
