= Li Guixian =

Chinese politician

- 李贵鲜

Governor of the People's Bank of China
- In office 1988–1993

Personal details
- Born: August 1937 (age 89) Gaizhou, Liaoning, China
- Party: Chinese Communist Party
- Education: University of Science and Technology of China; Mendeleev Chemical Technology Institute in Moscow

Li Guixian (Chinese: 李贵鲜; born August 1937) is a retired politician of the People's Republic of China, and a governor of People's Bank of China in 1988–1993.

Li is a native of Gaizhou, Liaoning Province. He studied at the Chinese University of Science and Technology in 1959–1960. Next, he studied at the Mendeleev Chemical Technology Institute in Moscow starting in 1960, graduating in 1965.

Li joined the Chinese Communist Party in 1962. He became the secretary of the CCP Liaoning Committee in 1985, and secretary of the CCP Anhui Committee in 1986. In 1988–1993, he served as the governor of the People's Bank of China.

Government offices
Preceded by Chen Muhua	Governor of the People's Bank of China; 1988–1993	Succeeded by Zhu Rongji
