= Huang Oudong =

Chinese politician

Huang Oudong (Chinese: 黄欧东) (September 14, 1905 – November 28, 1993) was a Chinese politician. He was born in Yongfeng County, Jiangxi Province. He was Chinese Communist Party Committee Secretary (1954–1958), Governor (1958–1967) and twice Chinese People's Political Consultative Conference Chairman (1955–1959, 1977–1980) of Liaoning. He was also mayor of Shenyang.

Military offices
New title	Political Commissar of the PLA Liaoning Military District; 1954–1959	Succeeded by Huang Huoqing
Party political offices
Preceded by new office	Communist Party Chief of Liaoning; 1954–1958	Succeeded by Huang Huoqing
Government offices
Preceded by Du Zheheng	Governor of Liaoning; 1958–1967	Succeeded by Chen Xilian
Assembly seats
Preceded by new office	CPPCC Chairman of Liaoning; 1955–1959	Succeeded by Huang Huoqing
Preceded by vacant since 1967	CPPCC Chairman of Liaoning; 1977–1980	Succeeded by Li Huang
