= Yue Qifeng =

Chinese politician

Yue Qifeng (Chinese: 岳岐峰) (December 1931 – March 24, 2008) was a People's Republic of China politician. He was born in Daming County, Hebei Province. In January 1945, at the age of 13, he joined the Chinese Communist Party. He was governor of his home province (1990).

Preceded by Xie Feng	Governor of Hebei; 1988–1990	Succeeded by Cheng Weigao
Preceded by Li Changchun	Governor of Liaoning; 1990–1994	Succeeded by Wen Shizhen
