= Chen Puru =

Chinese politician

Chen Puru (simplified Chinese: 陈璞如; traditional Chinese: 陳璞如; pinyin: Chén Púrú) (March 1918 – December 11, 1998) was a politician of the People's Republic of China.

Born in Boxing, Shandong, Chen joined the Chinese Communist Party in October 1937. In January 1980, Chen became the governor of Liaoning Province. From April 1982 to April 1985, Chen served as the Minister of Railways of China.

Chen was a member of 11th and 12th Central Committee of the Chinese Communist Party, and a member of 13th Central Advisory Committee.

He died on December 11, 1998, in Beijing.

Government offices
Preceded by Liu Jianzhang	Minister of Railways of the People's Republic of China; 1982–1985	Succeeded by Ding Guangen
