= 1962 in China =

- Decades: 1940s; 1950s; 1960s; 1970s; 1980s
- See also: Other events of 1962; History of China • Timeline • Years

Events from the year 1962 in China.

== Incumbents ==
- Chairman of the Chinese Communist Party – Mao Zedong
- President of the People's Republic of China – Liu Shaoqi
- Premier of the People's Republic of China – Zhou Enlai
- Chairman of the National People's Congress – Zhu De
- Vice President of the People's Republic of China – Soong Ching-ling and Dong Biwu
- Vice Premier of the People's Republic of China – Chen Yun

=== Governors ===
- Governor of Anhui Province – Huang Yan
- Governor of Fujian Province –
  - until unknown: Wu Hongxiang
  - month unknown: Jiang Yizhen
  - starting month unknown: Wei Jinshui
- Governor of Gansu Province – Deng Baoshan
- Governor of Guangdong Province – Chen Yu
- Governor of Guizhou Province – Zhou Lin
- Governor of Hebei Province – Liu Zihou
- Governor of Heilongjiang Province – Li Fanwu
- Governor of Henan Province – Wu Zhipu then Wen Minsheng
- Governor of Hubei Province – Zhang Tixue
- Governor of Hunan Province – Cheng Qian
- Governor of Jiangsu Province – Hui Yuyu
- Governor of Jiangxi Province – Shao Shiping
- Governor of Jilin Province – Li Youwen
- Governor of Liaoning Province – Huang Oudong
- Governor of Qinghai Province – Yuan Renyuan
- Governor of Shaanxi Province – Zhao Boping
- Governor of Shandong Province – Tan Qilong
- Governor of Shanxi Province – Wei Heng
- Governor of Sichuan Province – Li Dazhang
- Governor of Yunnan Province – Ding Yichuan
- Governor of Zhejiang Province – Zhou Jianren

== Events ==
- Four Pests campaign

== Establishments ==
- Yiling Senior High School
- Beijing Language and Culture University
- Chinese Xiangqi Association
- Hundred Flowers Awards
- Nanning Wuxu International Airport

== Births ==
- December - Li Xi
- January - Wang Xiaodong
- June 9 - Zhu Minzhu
- July 28 - Liang Weifen
- November 28 - Ma Yongfeng

== Deaths ==
- February 9 — Li Kenong, general and politician (b. 1899)
- February 14 — Hu Zongnan, general in the National Revolutionary Army and the Republic of China Army (b. 1896)
- February 24 — Hu Shih, academic, writer and politician (b. 1891)
- May 19 — Mei Yiqi, politician, physicist and educator (b. 1889)
- June 27 — Long Yun, warlord and former governor of Yunnan (b. 1884)
- August 15 — Lei Feng, soldier in the People's Liberation Army who was object of several major propaganda campaigns in China (b. 1940)
- September 19 — John Leighton Stuart, missionary educator, 1st President of Yenching University and later American ambassador to China (b. 1876)
- September 21 — Ouyang Yuqian, playwright, Peking opera actor and writer, film screenwriter and director and drama educator (b. 1889)
- October 1 — Lu Dachang, nationalist general from Gansu (b. 1889)
- December 24 — Li Jieren, writer and translator (b. 1891)

== See also ==
- Timeline of Chinese history
- 1962 in Chinese film
