= 1957 in China =

- Decades: 1930s; 1940s; 1950s; 1960s; 1970s
- See also: Other events of 1957; History of China • Timeline • Years

Events in the year 1957 in China. The country had an estimated population of 635 million people.

== Incumbents ==
- Chairman of the Chinese Communist Party: Mao Zedong
- President of the People's Republic of China: Mao Zedong
- Premier of the People's Republic of China: Zhou Enlai
- Chairman of the National People's Congress: Liu Shaoqi
- Vice President of the People's Republic of China: Zhu De
- Vice Premier of the People's Republic of China: Chen Yun

=== Governors ===
- Governor of Anhui Province: Huang Yan
- Governor of Fujian Province: Ye Fei
- Governor of Gansu Province: Deng Baoshan
- Governor of Guangdong Province: Tao Zhu (until August), Chen Yu (starting August)
- Governor of Guizhou Province: Zhou Lin
- Governor of Hebei Province: Lin Tie
- Governor of Heilongjiang Province: Ouyang Qin
- Governor of Henan Province: Wu Zhipu
- Governor of Hubei Province: Zhang Tixue
- Governor of Hunan Province: Cheng Qian
- Governor of Jiangsu Province: Hui Yuyu
- Governor of Jiangxi Province: Shao Shiping
- Governor of Jilin Province: Li Youwen
- Governor of Liaoning Province: Du Zheheng
- Governor of Qinghai Province: Sun Zuobin
- Governor of Shaanxi Province: Zhao Shoushan
- Governor of Shandong Province: Zhao Jianmin
- Governor of Shanxi Province: Wang Shiying
- Governor of Sichuan Province: Li Dazhang
- Governor of Yunnan Province: Guo Yingqiu
- Governor of Zhejiang Province: Sha Wenhan (until November), Huo Shilian (starting November)

== Events ==
- End of the Hundred Flowers Campaign
- Start of the Anti-Rightist Movement
- Establishment of the China Academy of Launch Vehicle Technology
- Continuing Kuomintang Islamic insurgency in China
- Promotion of the Five Goods Movement
- The Asian Flu killed around 1-2 million pe ple in China and Hong Kong.
- Official Soviet visit by Kliment Voroshilov Photo of the two leaders

=== Other events ===
- January 1 — Opening of Hangzhou Jianqiao Airport, in Jianggan District, Hangzhou, Zhejiang, to civil flights.
- October 15 — Opening of the Wuhan Yangtze River Bridge, in Wuhan, Hubei
- Establishments:
  - Gaoming Prison, in Gaoming District, Foshan City, Guangdong
  - Henan Experimental Middle School, in Jinshui District, Zhengzhou, Henan
  - Lujiang Prison, in Chaohu City, Anhui

== Births ==
=== January ===
- January 1 — Qiu He, politician who spent his career in Jiangsu and Yunnan
- January 13 — Fernando Chui, 2nd Chief Executive of Macau
- January 14 — Anchee Min, Chinese American author
- Li Jiheng, 10th Minister of Civil Affairs

=== March ===
- March 8 — Zhao Leji, 11th Chairman of the Standing Committee of the National People's Congress

=== April ===
- April 19 — Ge You, actor

=== May ===
- He Weidong, general of the People's Liberation Army

=== June ===
- June 7 — Hou Yu-ih, Taiwanese politician and former police officer
- June 12 — Ho Iat Seng, 3rd Chief Executive of Macau
- June 15 — Zhang Tielin, Chinese-British actor and film director
- June 22 — Lau Kong-wah, former Hong Kong government official

=== July ===
- July 11 — Wang Xiaohong, 15th Minister of Public Security
- July 25 — Alex Man, Hong Kong actor
- July 26 — Yuen Biao, Hong Kong actor, martial artist and stuntman
- Losang Jamcan, 9th Chairman of Tibet Autonomous Region

=== August ===
- August 1
  - Jiang Chaoliang, 13th Secretary of the Hubei Provincial Committee of the Chinese Communist Party
  - Xu Haifeng, pistol shooter
- August 18 — Tan Dun, Chinese-American composer and conductor
- August 26 — Yan Weiwen, contemporary opera singer

=== September ===
- September 8 — Fang Shu, film actress
- Tie Ning, author

=== October ===
- October 2 — Zhao Benshan, skit and sitcom actor, comedian, television director and businessman
- October 19 — Zhang Yu, actress
- October 20 — Gong Hanlin, actor, xiangsheng performer and sketch performer
- October 22 — Deng Jie, actress and producer

=== November ===
- November 11 — He Lin, engineer and a major general of the People's Liberation Army
- November 17 — Ying Yong, 11th Procurator-General of the Supreme People's Procuratorate
- Wang Ying, actor (d. 2024)
- Wang Yaonan, scientist

=== December ===
- December 1 — Wang Anshun, 16th Mayor of Beijing
- December 6 — Feng Gong, actor, xiangsheng performer, director, screenwriter and politician
- December 7 — John Lee Ka-chiu, 5th Chief Executive of Hong Kong
- December 12 — Gu Changwei, cinematographer and film director

=== Dates unknown ===
- Zhu Guohua, criminal and a grandson of Zhu De (d. 1983)

== Deaths ==
- August 18 — Zhang Shuqi, painter from Zhejiang (b. 1900)
- September 16 — Qi Baishi, painter (b. 1864)
- September 22 — Zhou Xuan, singer and film actress (b. 1920)
- October 7 — Yang Gang, journalist, novelist and translator (b. 1905)
- October 9 — Lü Simian, historian (b. 1884)

== See also ==
- 1957 in Chinese film
