= 1959 in China =

- Decades: 1930s; 1940s; 1950s; 1960s; 1970s
- See also: Other events of 1959; History of China • Timeline • Years

Events in the year 1959 in China. The country had an estimated population of 665 million people.

== Incumbents ==
- Chairman of the Chinese Communist Party: Mao Zedong
- President of the People's Republic of China: Mao Zedong (until April 27), Liu Shaoqi (starting April 27)
- Premier of the People's Republic of China: Zhou Enlai
- Chairman of the National People's Congress: Liu Shaoqi (until April 27), Zhu De (starting April 27)
- Vice President of the People's Republic of China: Zhu De (until April 27), Song Qingling & Dong Biwu (starting April 27)
- Vice Premier of the People's Republic of China: Chen Yun

=== Governors ===
- Governor of Anhui Province: Huang Yan
- Governor of Fujian Province: Ye Fei then Jiang Yizhen
- Governor of Gansu Province: Deng Baoshan
- Governor of Guangdong Province: Chen Yu
- Governor of Guizhou Province: Zhou Lin
- Governor of Hebei Province: Liu Zihou
- Governor of Heilongjiang Province: Li Fanwu
- Governor of Henan Province: Wu Zhipu
- Governor of Hubei Province: Zhang Tixue
- Governor of Hunan Province: Cheng Qian
- Governor of Jiangsu Province: Hui Yuyu
- Governor of Jiangxi Province: Shao Shiping
- Governor of Jilin Province: Li Youwen
- Governor of Liaoning Province: Huang Oudong
- Governor of Qinghai Province: Yuan Renyuan
- Governor of Shaanxi Province: Zhao Shoushan (until July), Zhao Boping (starting July)
- Governor of Shandong Province: Tan Qilong
- Governor of Shanxi Province: Wei Heng
- Governor of Sichuan Province: Li Dazhang
- Governor of Yunnan Province: Ding Yichuan
- Governor of Zhejiang Province: Zhou Jianren

== Events ==
- Continuing Great Leap Forward
- Continuing Great Chinese Famine
- April - First plenary session of the 2nd National People's Congress, Liu Shaoqi was elected the President of China.
- March 10 - Start of the 1959 Tibetan uprising
- July 2 - Start of the Lushan Conference
- October 1 - 10th anniversary of the People's Republic of China
- Visit of Nikita Khrushchev from the Soviet Union: Photo of welcoming delegation:

=== Other events ===
- October 1 - Opening of Changfeng Park, in Putuo District, Shanghai
- Opening of People's Park, in Xining, Qinghai
- Establishment of Chaohu Prison, in Chaohu, Anhui
- Establishment of the Fourth Affiliated Hospital of XMU, in Urumqi, Xinjiang
- Establishment of the National Ballet of China Symphony Orchestra
- Establishment of the State Bureau of Surveying and Mapping

== Education ==
=== Establishments ===
- Anhui University of Chinese Medicine, in Hefei, Anhui
- Anhui University of Finance and Economics, in Bengbu, Anhui
- Beijing Institute of Textile Technology
- Yunnan Arts University, in Kunming, Yunnan

== Births ==
- Li Qiang
- Zhu Xingliang
- Deng Kai
- Dai Jinhua
- Ma Zhengqi

== Deaths ==
- Wong Shik Ling
- Lei Jingtian
- Zhang Xi
- Li Daichen
- Li Jishen

== See also ==
- 1959 in Chinese film
