= 1963 in China =

- Decades: 1940s; 1950s; 1960s; 1970s; 1980s
- See also: Other events of 1963; History of China • Timeline • Years

Events from the year 1963 in China.

== Incumbents ==
- Chairman of the Chinese Communist Party – Mao Zedong
- President of the People's Republic of China – Liu Shaoqi
- Premier of the People's Republic of China – Zhou Enlai
- Chairman of the National People's Congress – Zhu De
- Vice President of the People's Republic of China – Soong Ching-ling and Dong Biwu
- Vice Premier of the People's Republic of China – Chen Yun

=== Governors ===
- Governor of Anhui Province – Huang Yan
- Governor of Fujian Province – Wei Jinshui
- Governor of Gansu Province – Deng Baoshan
- Governor of Guangdong Province – Chen Yu
- Governor of Guizhou Province – Zhou Lin
- Governor of Hebei Province – Liu Zihou
- Governor of Heilongjiang Province – Li Fanwu
- Governor of Henan Province – Wen Minsheng
- Governor of Hubei Province – Zhang Tixue
- Governor of Hunan Province – Cheng Qian
- Governor of Jiangsu Province – Hui Yuyu
- Governor of Jiangxi Province – Shao Shiping
- Governor of Jilin Province – Li Youwen
- Governor of Liaoning Province – Huang Oudong
- Governor of Qinghai Province – Wang Zhao
- Governor of Shaanxi Province – Zhao Boping (until March), Li Qiming (starting March)
- Governor of Shandong Province – Tan Qilong then Bai Rubing
- Governor of Shanxi Province – Wei Heng
- Governor of Sichuan Province – Li Dazhang
- Governor of Yunnan Province – Ding Yichuan
- Governor of Zhejiang Province – Zhou Jianren

== Events ==
- August 9 – According to Chinese government official confirmed document on 1986, a torrential heavy massive rain, with many dam collapse, flood swept hit in Beijing, Tianjin and Hebei Province, total 5,154 persons were human fatalities.

== Births ==
- January 16 - Pu Zhongjie, businessman and entrepreneur
- February 20 - Cui Yongyuan, Chinese TV host
- August 26 - Liu Huan, musician
- November - Hu Zhaoyun, entrepreneur and industrialist

== Deaths ==
- January 3 — Zhu Jiahua, scientist, geologist and Nationalist politician (b. 1893)
- June 11 — Shen Junru, 1st President of the Supreme People's Court (b. 1875)
- September 14 — Feng Zhanhai, military leader and government official (b. 1899)
- December 16 — Luo Ronghuan, Marshal of the People's Republic of China and Vice Chairman of the Standing Committee of the National People's Congress (b. 1902)

== See also ==
- Timeline of Chinese history
- 1963 in Chinese film
