= 1961 in China =

- Decades: 1940s; 1950s; 1960s; 1970s; 1980s
- See also: Other events of 1961; History of China • Timeline • Years

Events in the year 1961 in China. The country had an estimated population of 695 million people.

== Incumbents ==
- Chairman of the Chinese Communist Party – Mao Zedong
- President of the People's Republic of China – Liu Shaoqi
- Premier of the People's Republic of China – Zhou Enlai
- Chairman of the National People's Congress – Zhu De
- Vice President of the People's Republic of China – Soong Ching-ling and Dong Biwu
- Vice Premier of the People's Republic of China – Chen Yun

=== Governors ===
- Governor of Anhui Province – Huang Yan
- Governor of Fujian Province – Wu Hongxiang
- Governor of Gansu Province – Deng Baoshan
- Governor of Guangdong Province – Chen Yu
- Governor of Guizhou Province – Zhou Lin
- Governor of Hebei Province – Liu Zihou
- Governor of Heilongjiang Province – Li Fanwu
- Governor of Henan Province – Wu Zhipu
- Governor of Hubei Province – Zhang Tixue
- Governor of Hunan Province – Cheng Qian
- Governor of Jiangsu Province – Hui Yuyu
- Governor of Jiangxi Province – Shao Shiping
- Governor of Jilin Province – Li Youwen
- Governor of Liaoning Province – Huang Oudong
- Governor of Qinghai Province – Yuan Renyuan
- Governor of Shaanxi Province – Zhao Boping
- Governor of Shandong Province – Tan Qilong
- Governor of Shanxi Province – Wei Heng
- Governor of Sichuan Province – Li Dazhang
- Governor of Yunnan Province – Ding Yichuan
- Governor of Zhejiang Province – Zhou Jianren

== Events ==
- until February 9 - Campaign at the China–Burma border
- July 11 - Signing of the Sino-North Korean Mutual Aid and Cooperation Friendship Treaty
- Continuing Great Chinese Famine

=== Other events ===
- Establishment of the Logistical Engineering University of PLA, in Chongqing
- April 27 – A container shipping and logistics brand on worldwide, COSCO was founded.
- Establishment of Oil Worker's Children Middle School, in Ranghulu District, Daqing, Heilongjiang
- On 28 July 1961, excerpts of the novel Liu Zhidan were published in People's Daily. Some in Chinese leadership viewed the novel as evidence of an anti-party clique and the novel resulted in political controversy and contestation.

== Deaths ==
- March 16 – Chen Geng, military officer (b. 1903)
- August 8 – Mei Lanfang, opera artist (b. 1894)
- August 12 – Tan Kah Kee, businessman, investor, and philanthropist active in Singapore and the Chinese cities of Hong Kong, Shanghai, Xiamen, and Guangzhou (b. 1874)

== Sports ==
- April 5 to April 14 - 1961 World Table Tennis Championships

== See also ==
- 1961 in Chinese film
