= Eternity in Flames =

- Film poster
- 烈火中永生
- Directed by: Shui Hua
- Screenplay by: Zhou Gao
- Based on: Red Crag by Luo Guangbin, Yang Yiyan, and Liu Debin
- Starring: Yu Lan; Zhao Dan
- Cinematography: Zhu Jinming
- Music by: Zhu Jian'er
- Production company: Beijing Film Studio
- Release date: 1965
- Running time: 138 minutes
- Country: China
- Language: Chinese

Eternity in Flames (Chinese: 烈火中永生; pinyin: Lièhuǒ Zhōng Yǒngshēng), also known as Red Crag, is a black-and-white 1965 Chinese-language film directed by Shui Hua. Starring Yu Lan and Zhao Dan, it tells the story of a young woman who leads a band of Communist guerillas after the death of her husband. After being betrayed, she is imprisoned with other Chinese Communist Party (CCP) members by the Kuomintang (KMT). Unwilling to betray her cause, she is executed shortly before a mass escape.

Based on Red Crag (1961), Eternity in Flames drew from the novel and interviews to tell its story. Initially focused on male revolutionaries, a rewrite by Xia Yan resulted in a focus on a female protagonist. The film, approved for release in 1964, was pulled from circulation during the Cultural Revolution. Since its reintroduction, it has become part of school curricula and used for political education.

== Plot ==
In late 1948, the Chinese Communist Party (CCP) member Jiang is travelling to meet with a local guerilla band. She finds the head of her husband, a guerilla leader, hanging over a city wall and learns that he has been executed by the Kuomintang (KMT). Jiang decides to lead the band in his stead, but is captured after being betrayed. Also captured are several members of the city's CCP network, including its leader Xu Yunfeng. The communists are taken to a prison camp, where they are tortured. Jiang refuses to capitulate, thereby winning the respect of her fellow internees. Over time, the prisoners prepare for a mass escape, which is launched even after the KMT execute Jiang and Xu. Some are successful, while others are killed by KMT gunfire.

== Production ==
=== Background ===
Eternity in Flames was adapted from the novel Red Crag (1961), which had been written by Luo Guangbin, Yang Yiyan, and Liu Debin. Survivors of KMT internment camps, they had previously published several recounts of their experiences in newspapers, expanding details in subsequent iterations based on audience feedback. After an extensive rewriting, wherein CCP officials urged them to abandon an experience-based approach for a broader view that looked beyond the camps to the CCP's successes elsewhere, the book was published to official acclaim. Between 1961 and 1980, more than ten million copies were issued in twenty printings.

The actress Yu Lan read excerpts of Red Crag while hospitalized in 1961, later finding a full edition to finish its story. Interested in adapting the novel, she reached out to Shui Hua – who had directed her in A Revolutionary Family (1961) – and proposed a collaboration. The two reached out to the novel's authors, and together they worked on adapting Red Crag to film. Research for the project included interviews with survivors of the era, including former KMT officials Xu Yuanju and Shen Zui. The initial draft, which followed the male revolutionaries Xu Yunfeng and Cheng Gang, was rejected by the Beijing Film Studio as too dry.

In late 1963, Yu and Shui reached out to the playwright Xia Yan, who had previously worked on Shui's A Revolutionary Family. Xia proposed using the character of Jiang – who in the second draft had only two scenes – as a parallel to Xu Yunfeng, arguing that her status as a wife and mother would draw the emotional investment of audiences. He completed the script in several days, having asked for a week. As production came to a close in late 1964, Xia Yan was falling out of favour with CCP Chairman Mao Zedong; he was consequently credited using the pseudonym Zhou Gao.

Cinematography for the film was handled by Zhu Jinming, who had previously worked on the 1951 film Shangrao Concentration Camp. Filming was done in black-and-white, with on-site shooting done in Chongqing and extras provided by the Chongqing Art Troupe. Several revisions were made, with eighty scenes reportedly reshot to ensure compliance with CCP reviewers' expectations. One member of the Publicity Department of the CCP insisted that the title Red Crag be changed, as its departures from the source material – some twenty in number – were deemed unrepresentational.

=== Characters and characterization ===
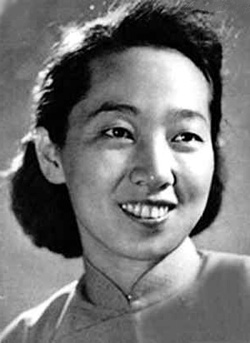
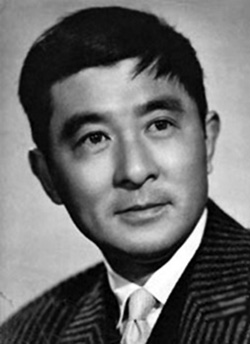
Yu Lan and Zhao Dan were cast as Jiang and Xu Yunfeng, respectively

The lead role of Jiang was played by Yu Lan, who had previously portrayed the revolutionaries Liu Hulan and Zhao Yiman. At the urging of Xia Yan, she drew on the character's urban-educated background to present her as "a gentle woman with a remarkably strong will and as an ordinary woman of extraordinary deeds." Later in life, she identified the character as a role model, someone she attempted to emulate in her own activities. As the male lead, Zhao Dan was cast upon the recommendation of cinematographer Zhu Jinming. According to the People's Daily, Yu was initially uncertain of asking him to play a supporting role, but he agreed readily. As the prison camp warden, Xiang Kun was cast. The child actress Fang Shu was cast as Little Radish Head, a child prisoner.

The characters in Eternity in Flames, as in the novel, were based on CCP members and their families. Jiang has been identified with Jiang Zhujun, a CCP member who had led an underground publication before taking over a guerrilla band after her husband's death. The male lead, Xu Yunfeng, has been variously identified with Wang Xiaohe, Che Yaoxian, and Luo Shiwen. Little Radish Head was inspired by Song Zhenzhong, the son of Song Qiyun and Xu Linxia, who was detained from the age of eight months.

== Themes ==
In his book Chinese Cinema: Culture and Politics since 1949, Paul Clark argues that Eternity in Flames showed the potential of making a "revolutionary film with restrained heroics and less falseness." He suggests that the warden is implied to be a prisoner as well, noting that the character is consistently portrayed near windows. The sinologist Charles Laughlin suggests, meanwhile, that the film hides hints of sadomasochism in its depictions of corporeal violence.

Laughlin also identifies an intertwining of "violence and sexual suggestion", made implicit due to the revolutionary themes that dominate the film. He identifies Jiang and Xu Yunfeng as being presented, implicitly, as becoming a couple over the film, a union that is supported by their fellow prisoners. Elsewhere, he finds an "electric intersection" of "hatred and desire for the villain" in Jiang's slapping of Fu Zhigao – the traitor who revealed her. One addition to the film, he notes, is a female KMT official who dresses in tight uniforms and moves provocatively; her corollary in the novel is male.

== Releases ==
An early screening of Eternity in Flames was held for senior CCP members on 27 December 1964, with Jiang Qing – a former actress and one of the wives of Mao Zedong – in attendance. During the screening, she was highly critical, questioning the use of black-and-white film while noting issues with camerawork as well as departures from historical record. She also critiqued the casting of Zhao Dan, whom she deemed poorly suited for the character, and decried the prisoners' successful escape from the camp. Nevertheless, she ultimately approved the release of the film. Premier Zhou Enlai responded positively to the film, albeit with the recommendation that the deaths of the main characters be reshot.

Eternity in Flames received a wide release in mid-1965, the year after the PLA Air Force's political department had staged an opera adaptation of Red Crag. In the midst of the Cultural Revolution, Jiang Qing reassessed the film, branding it as going "against Chairman Mao's thought" and distorting "the historical reality by depicting the rural struggles as having been led by the urban sector". Eternity in Flames was removed from circulation at this time, (Note: Jiang Qing, one of the Gang of Four, declared more than four hundred Chinese-made films to be "poisonous weeds", having in 1964 banned the circulation of foreign-made films from before 1949 (Hilton 1981, p. 18). Ultimately, these Chinese-made films were also banned, though still discussed in the media as objects of criticism (Clark 2008, p. 149). Domestic film production only resumed in the 1970s (Hilton 1981, p. 18).) and Jiang prepared her own adaptation of the novel Red Crag. It was the last film to be written by Xia Yan, who was removed from his position as Deputy Minister of Culture and imprisoned for eight years. It was also the last film of Zhao Dan, who was arrested in 1967 and held until 1973, being forced to write spurious confessions every day.

In 2005, the Guangzhou-based company Beauty Culture Communication released a DVD edition of Eternity in Flames with English-language subtitles. The film is also commonly known as Red Crag, taken from the title of the book, in English-language sources. This title is a reference to Red Crag Village, where the CCP had headquartered its southern bureau between 1936 and 1946 and incited peasant revolts against the KMT government.

== Legacy ==
Eternity in Flames has become a success in mainland China, with the character Sister Jiang becoming a household name. Owing to the film's influence, propaganda depictions of Jiang Zhujun have consistently depicted her as presented in the film: wearing a scarf, cardigan, and dress. In her exploration of the construction of womanhood in the People's Republic of China, Wang Zheng writes that films such as Eternity in Flames made mainstream an image of "brave, selfless revolutionary heroines" that remained widespread across generations of Chinese women – particularly urban ones. Discussing the works of Yu Lan, The Paper identified Jiang as the actress' most classic role; Fang Shu likewise remained identified with her role in the film into the 1990s.

After the Cultural Revolution, Eternity in Flames was incorporated into school curricula. According to the sinologist Kirk Denton, the novel and film have become the main sources of information for the average Chinese citizen regarding the Red Crag site and its history. In 2021, the Beijing International Film Festival developed an interactive display for the film as part of its "Bright Banner – Glorious Lights and Shadows" exhibition. Meant to commemorate the 100th anniversary of the CCP, this exhibition featured reproductions of two scenes from the film: one in which the prisoners embroider a red flag and another in which the child prisoner Little Radish Head releases a butterfly.

== Works cited ==
- Barnes, Amy Jane (2024). "Revolutionary Heroes in Chinese Propaganda Posters". Encyclopedia of Heroism Studies. Cham: Springer. pp. 1751–1758. doi:10.1007/978-3-031-48129-1_129. ISBN 978-3-031-48128-4.
- 中国电影明星录 [Chinese Movie Stars] (in Chinese). Xueyuan Publishing House. 1990. ISBN 978-7-5077-0260-6.
- Clark, Paul (1987). Chinese Cinema: Culture and Politics Since 1949. Cambridge: Cambridge University Press. ISBN 978-0-521-32638-4.
- Clark, Paul (2008). The Chinese Cultural Revolution: A History. Cambridge: Cambridge University Press. ISBN 978-0-521-87515-8.
- Denton, Kirk A. (2014). Exhibiting the Past: Historical Memory and the Politics of Museums in Post-Socialist China. Honolulu: University of Hawai'i Press. ISBN 978-0-8248-4006-8.
- "Eternity in Flames". WorldCat. OCLC 1129834460.
- Hilton, Isabel (1981). "A Hundred Flowers or Poisonous Weeds?". Index on Censorship. 10 (4): 16–19. doi:10.1080/03064228108533228.
- Jing Wendong (敬文東) (2009). 事情總會起變化: 以中國共產黨黨史小說《紅岩》為中心 [Things Will Always Change: Focusing on the Chinese Communist Party History Novel "Red Rock"] (in Chinese). Showway Publishing. ISBN 978-986-221-184-7.
- Kauffman, Andrew (2020). "Imagining the New Socialist Child: The Cultural Afterlife of the Child Martyr Wang Erxiao". Cross-Currents: East Asian History and Culture Review. 9: 269–296. doi:10.1353/ach.2020.0006.
- King, Richard (2013). Milestones on a Golden Road: Writing for Chinese Socialism, 1945–80. Vancouver: UBC Press. ISBN 978-0-7748-2374-6.
- Roberts, Rosemary; Li, Li, eds. (2018). "How to Tell a Story of Imprisonment: Ideology, Truth, and Melodramatic Body in the Making of Red Crag". The Making and Remaking of China's "Red Classics": Politics, Aesthetics, and Mass Culture. Vol. 1. Hong Kong: Hong Kong University Press. pp. 42–58. doi:10.5790/hongkong/9789888390892.003.0003. ISBN 978-988-8390-89-2.
- Shi Guanghui (石光辉), ed. (15 April 2019). 罗世文：《红岩》英雄许云峰原型 [Luo Shiwen: The Prototype of the Hero Xu Yunfeng in Red Crag]. Guangming Daily (in Chinese) – via Communist Party Member Network.
- "Welcome to Visit "Immersive Rooms" for Revolutionary Films". Beijing International Film Festival. 2021.
- Xiao Yu (肖玉) (9 July 2021). 于蓝——永远的"江姐" [Yu Lan – the Eternal "Jiang Jie"]. The Paper (in Chinese).
- Xiao, Zhiwei (1998). "Red Crag". In Zhang, Yingjin; Xiao, Zhiwei (eds.). Encyclopedia of Chinese Film. New York, London: Routledge. p. 279. ISBN 978-0-415-15168-9.
- Xiao, Zhiwei (1998). "Xia Yan". In Zhang, Yingjin; Xiao, Zhiwei (eds.). Encyclopedia of Chinese Film. New York, London: Routledge. pp. 374–375. ISBN 978-0-415-15168-9.
- Zhang, Fang; Laughlin, Charles (2019). "The Revolutionary Imagination in Chinese Studies in America: An Interview with Charles A. Laughlin". Chinese Literature Today. 8 (2): 94–107. doi:10.1080/21514399.2019.1675359. ProQuest 2354435411.
- Zhang, Yingjin (2008). "Zhao Dan: Spectrality of Martyrdom and Stardom". Journal of Chinese Cinemas. 2 (2): 103–111. doi:10.1386/jcc.2.2.103_1.
- Zheng, Wang (2016). Finding Women in the State. Berkeley: University of California Press. doi:10.1525/california/9780520292284.001.0001. ISBN 978-0-520-29228-4.
- Zuo Heng (左衡) (29 October 2022). 电影《烈火中永生》这样诞生 [How the Movie "Eternity in Flames" was Born]. People's Daily (in Chinese). China Communist Party News Network.
