= Hélène Châtelain =

French actress (1935–2020)

- Born: 28 December 1935; Etterbeek, Belgium
- Died: 11 April 2020 (aged 84); Paris, France
- Occupations: Actor, translator, writer, filmmaker

Hélène Châtelain (28 December 1935 – 11 April 2020) was a Belgian-born French actress who appeared as "the woman" in Chris Marker's La Jetée (1962), and later worked with playwright Armand Gatti and Iossif Pasternak. She was also a translator, writer and filmmaker (Goulag).

On 11 April 2020 Châtelain died from COVID-19 at the age of 84.

== Selected filmography ==
=== Actress ===
- La Jetée (1962)

=== Scriptwriter/director ===
- 1973: Les Prisons aussi, film 16 mn, directed by Hélène Châtelain and René Lefort. Production : G.I.P. (Michel Foucault), 1973
- 1972/73: "Dix jours sur la Z.U.P. des Minguettes ou l'Amazonie est de l'autre côté de la rue", film vidéo 1/2 pouce, directed by Hélène Châtelain and Stéphane Gatti. Production : A.C.I.D.E.
- 1976: Le lion, sa cage et ses ailes, 6 films vidéo 1/2 pouce by Armand Gatti, shooting and editing by Hélène Châtelain and Stéphane Gatti Production : Les Voyelles et l'I.N.A.
- 1977: Siniavsky, une voix dans le cœur, film 16 mn, auteur Hélène Châtelain, réalisé par Carlos de LLanos. Production : Seuil Audiovisuel, 1977.
- 1979: La première lettre, 6 films vidéo Umatic d'Armand Gatti, tournage et montage d'Hélène Châtelain, Stéphane Gatti et Claude Mouriéras. Production : Les Voyelles et l'I.N.A. (1979). Passage à FR3 en juillet/août * 1979. Et un inédit directed by H. Châtelain.
- 1980: Un Poème, cinq films, video film Umatic, written by Hélène Châtelain, directed and edited by Stéphane Gatti. On the work of Armand Gatti. Production : Les Voyelles et Ministère des Relations Extérieures.
- 1982: Irlande, terre promise, film vidéo Umatic, written and directed by Hélène Châtelain. Documentary on the context of the filming of Nous étions tous des noms d'arbres (We were all names of trees). Production : Les Voyelles et Dérives Films Production
- 1985: Nous ne sommes pas des personnages historiques, film vidéo BVU by Hélène Châtelain. Production : Les Voyelles et l'Archéoptéryx, Documentary on the play by Armand Gatti and the character of Nestor Makhno.
- 1985: Les Gens de la moitié du chemin, film vidéo BVU by Hélène Châtelain. On the Hmong community (Laos) refugees in Toulouse. Production : Les Voyelles et l'Archéoptéryx.
- 1985: Le Double Voyage, film vidéo BVU by Hélène Châtelain and Christophe Loyer. Text, drawings and sculptures: Christophe Loyer ; Editing : Hélène Châtelain. Production : L'Archéoptéryx, Ministère de la culture. Les Voyelles,
- 1987: Maintenant, ça va, film vidéo BVU byHélène Châtelain. Co-production : Centre Simone de Beauvoir et La Parole Errante.
- 1988: Pourquoi les oiseaux chantent, film vidéo BVU by Hélène Châtelain. Co-production : Centre Simone de Beauvoir et La Parole Errante.
- 1988: Le Bannissement (film about the poet Alexandre Galitch)
- 1990: Qui suis-je ? (Marseille 1990), film vidéo bétacam by Hélène Châtelain after a script by Armand Gatti Co-production La Parole Errante Vidéo 13, 1990. Portraits of trainees on Armand Gatti's play Le Cinécadre de l'esplanade Loreto reconstructed in Marseille for the great parade of the Eastern countries.
- 1990: De la petite Russie à l’Ukraine, film by Iossif Pasternak, text by Leonid Plyushch (Hélène Châtelain is at the initiative of the project). Production Vidéo 13.- ARTE
- 1991: Moscou, 3 jours en août, film by Iossif Pasternak, co-montage et traduction d’Hélène Châtelain. Production Vidéo 13. ARTE.
- 1992: Le Fantôme Efremov
- 1994: La Cité des savants (telefilm Arte)
- 1996: Nestor Makhno, paysan d’Ukraine, with English subtitles on Internet Archive.
- 1997: Mikhaïl A. Boulgakov, in cooperation with Iossif Pasternak
- 2000: Goulag, documentary written by Hélène Châtelain, directed by Iossif Pasternak, 220 min, 13 Production8, the documentary was broadcast in June 2000 by Arte, in 2 parts (2 times 110 min)
- 2003: Le Génie du mal, documentary on the Russian composer, Alexandre Lokchine (1920–1987), making Iossif Pasternak, co-written by Hélène Châtelain, 85 min, 13 Production10
- 2003: Chant public devant deux chaises électriques
- 2004: Efremov, lettre d’une Russie oubliée

== Theatre ==
=== Comedian ===
- 1962: L'avenir est dans les œufs ou il faut de tout pour faire un monde by Eugène Ionesco, direction Jean-Marie Serreau, Théâtre de la Gaîté-Montparnasse
- 1963: L'avenir est dans les œufs ou il faut de tout pour faire un monde by Eugène Ionesco, direction Jean-Marie Serreau, Théâtre de l'Ambigu
- 1963: Amédée ou Comment s'en débarrasser by Eugène Ionesco, direction Jean-Marie Serreau, Théâtre de l'Ambigu
- 1964: Maître Puntila et son valet Matti by Bertolt Brecht, direction Georges Wilson, TNP Théâtre de Chaillot
- 1965: Les Troyennes by Euripides, direction by Michael Cacoyannis, TNP Théâtre de Chaillot, Festival d'Avignon 1965 and 1966
- 1966: Chant public devant deux chaises électriques by Armand Gatti, directed by the author, TNP Théâtre de Chaillot
- 1966: Un homme seul by Armand Gatti directed by the author, Comédie de Saint-Étienne
- 1967: La Nuit des Rois by Shakespeare par les comédiens de Toulouse face aux événements du Sud-Est asiatique : V comme Vietnam by Armand Gatti, directed by Armand Gatti, Théâtre Daniel Sorano Toulouse
- 1968: La Cigogne by Armand Gatti, directed by Jean Hurstel, University of Strasbourg
- 1975: Le Joint by Armand Gatti, directed by Armand Gatti, Festival d'Automne, CES Jean Lurçat de Ris-Orangis
- 1977: Le Cheval qui se suicide par le feu by Armand Gatti, directed by Armand Gatti, Festival d'Avignon
- 1982: Le Labyrinthe by Armand Gatti, directed by Armand Gatti, Festival d'Avignon

== Director ==
1969: La Journée d'une infirmière, by Armand Gatti 1996: L'Enfant rat, by Armand Gatti, Festival des francophonies

== Translator ==
- 1978: Quatre femmes terroristes contre le tsar, by Vera Zassoulitch, Olga Loubatovitch, Élisabeth Kovalskaïa, Vera Figner, texts collected and presented by Christine Fauré
- 2008: Éloge des voyages insensés, by Vassili Golovanov (Prix Russophonie 2009 for translation)
- 2013: Espaces et Labyrinthes, translation from Russian by Hélène Châtelain, éditions Verdier, collection « Slovo », 2013, 256 p.

== Publications ==
- Foreword to Armand Gatti, Les Personnages de théâtre meurent dans la rue, Revue Axolotl – Revue Nomade, n°1, 1996.
- Foreword to Armand Gatti, Opéra avec titre long, Toulouse, L’Ether vague, 1986.
- « Nestor Makhno. Les images et les mots », in Cinéma Engagé, Cinéma Enragé, L'homme Et La Société (revue internationale de recherche et de synthèse en sciences sociales) no 127–128, L'Harmattan, 1998 (DOI:10.3406/homso.1998.3562)
- L’insurrection de l’esprit : Khlebnikov / Gatti », Europe, no 877, May 2002.
