= Red Crag =

1961 novel by Luo Guangbin and Yang Yiyan

- Cover of English translation published by Foreign Languages Press
- Author: Luo Guangbin and Yang Yiyan (Luo Kuang-pin and Yang Yi-yen)
- Language: Chinese
- Publication place: China

Red Crag or Red Rock (Chinese: 红岩; pinyin: Hóngyán) was a 1961 novel based partly on fact by Chinese authors Luo Guangbin and Yang Yiyan, who were former inmates in a Kuomintang prison in Sichuan. It was set in Chongqing during the Chinese Civil War in 1949, and featured underground communist agents under the command of Zhou Enlai fighting an espionage battle against the Kuomintang.

The main protagonist Jiang Xueqin, or "Sister Jiang" (Chinese: 江姐; pinyin: Jiāng Jiě), is based on the Communist revolutionary Jiang Zhuyun (1920–1949). The novel contains a major scene in which Sister Jiang and fellow prisoners learn embroider the national flag together upon learning of the establishment of the People's Republic of China.

The novel contained a highly negative portrayal for the Sino-American Cooperative Organization, as responsible for the running prisons jailing communists and other political dissidents, although in reality they were actually run by the KMT secret police service BIS, and had no American involvement.

Xujun Eberlein wrote in The Atlantic that "The novel played a critical role in the heroism culture of the Mao era."

The book includes a poem that was attributed to, but was not written by, the revolutionary "martyr" Chen Ran (陈然, 1923－1949).

== Adaptations ==
The 1964 Chinese-language western-style opera titled Sister Jiang is based on the novel. The opera was composed by Yang Ming and Jiang Chunyang, musicians of the art bureau of the Chinese Air Force. In 1965, a feature film adaptation directed by Shui Hua was released; titled Eternity in Flames (烈火中永生), it starred Yu Lan and Zhao Dan.

In 2002, at the invitation of the German World Art Festival, director Zhang Yuan presented a Peking opera (also titled Sister Jiang), with Zhang Huoding in the title role, at the Cologne Grand Theater - the first major presentation of a revolutionary opera in Europe. Zhang Yuan made a film version of the production in 2003.

In 2004, a Peking opera titled Hua Ziliang was produced by Tianjin Chinese Opera Theater for DVD in 2004 with Wang Pin in the title role. Hua Ziliang is a character from the novel.

A 2010 CCTV-1 TV series also titled Sister Jiang is also based on this novel.
