= 1958 in China =

- Decades: 1930s; 1940s; 1950s; 1960s; 1970s
- See also: Other events of 1958; History of China • Timeline • Years

Events in the year 1958 in the People's Republic of China.

== Incumbents ==
- Chairman of the Chinese Communist Party: Mao Zedong
- President of the People's Republic of China: Mao Zedong
- Premier of the People's Republic of China: Zhou Enlai
- Chairman of the National People's Congress: Liu Shaoqi
- Vice President of the People's Republic of China: Zhu De
- Vice Premier of the People's Republic of China: Chen Yun

=== Governors ===
- Governor of Anhui Province: Huang Yan
- Governor of Fujian Province: Ye Fei
- Governor of Gansu Province: Deng Baoshan
- Governor of Guangdong Province: Chen Yu
- Governor of Guizhou Province: Zhou Lin (politician)
- Governor of Hebei Province: Lin Tie then Liu Zihou
- Governor of Heilongjiang Province: Ouyang Qin then Li Fanwu
- Governor of Henan Province: Wu Zhipu
- Governor of Hubei Province: Zhang Tixue
- Governor of Hunan Province: Cheng Qian
- Governor of Jiangsu Province: Hui Yuyu
- Governor of Jiangxi Province: Shao Shiping
- Governor of Jilin Province: Li Youwen
- Governor of Liaoning Province: Du Zheheng then Yuan Renyuan
- Governor of Qinghai Province:
  - until month unknown: Sun Zuobin
  - month unknown: Sun Junyi
  - starting month unknown: Yuan Renyuan
- Governor of Shaanxi Province: Zhao Shoushan
- Governor of Shandong Province: Zhao Jianmin then Tan Qilong
- Governor of Shanxi Province: Wang Shiying then Wei Heng
- Governor of Sichuan Province: Li Dazhang
- Governor of Yunnan Province: Guo Yingqiu (until November), Ding Yichuan (starting November)
- Governor of Zhejiang Province: Huo Shilian (until January), Zhou Jianren (starting January)

== Events ==
- February 11 – Marshal Chen Yi succeeds Premier Zhou Enlai as Chinese Minister of Foreign affairs.
- May 23 – Chairman Mao Zedong started his "Great Leap Forward" movement in the People's Republic of China.
- July 31 – Chinese–Tibet Uprising.
- August 23 – Chinese Civil War: The Second Taiwan Strait crisis begins with the People's Liberation Army's bombardment of Quemoy.
- October Unknown date — Sichan Radio Manufacturing, as predecessor of home appliance and visual electronic brand Changhong was founded.
- In 1958, China completed its first vacuum-tube computer.

== Births ==
=== January ===
- January 20 — Huo Jianqi, film director

=== February ===
- February 1 — Tony Leung Ka-fai, Hong Kong actor
- February 5 — Huang Yubin, head coach of the Men's Artistic Gymnastics Team of China
- February 15 — Li Youbin, actor
- Wang Dongfeng, 16th Mayor of Tianjin

=== March ===
- March 5 — Yi Gang, 12th Governor of the People's Bank of China
- March 18 — Feng Xiaogang, film director, screenwriter, actor, producer and politician

=== May ===
- May 1 — Mang Hoi, Hong Kong actor and action director (d. 2023)

=== June ===
- June 18 — Michael Miu, Hong Kong actor and businessman

=== August ===
- August 17 — Chip Tsao, Hong Kong-based columnist, broadcaster and writer
- August 21 — Cora Miao, Hong Kong actress
- August 23 — Wang Shuo, writer
- August 30 — Yu Rongguang, actor and martial artist
- Bu Xiaolin, 11th Chairwoman of Inner Mongolia
- Che Dalha, 10th Chairman of the Tibet Autonomous Region

=== September ===
- September 2 — Hu Mei, film director, television director and producer
- September 7 — Danny Chan, Hong Kong singer, songwriter and actor (d. 1993)
- Chen Xuefeng, politician and mining executive from Henan

=== October ===
- October 2 — Dilber Yunus, Uyghur lyric soprano
- October 9 — Hui Ka Yan, former billionaire businessman

=== November ===
- November 6 — Bai Baoshan, serial killer (d. 1998)
- November 10 — Yang Liping, dancer and choreographer

=== December ===
- December 24 — Wang Luoyang, actor
- December 27 — Xu Shaohua, actor
- Guo Mingyi, philanthropist

=== Dates unknown ===
- Di Li Feng, contemporary artist

== Deaths ==
- February 10
  - Huang Jing, 1st Mayor of Tianjin (b. 1912)
  - Yang Baosen, Peking opera singer (b. 1909)
- February 16 — Situ Qiao, oil painter and graphic artist (b. 1902)
- March 9 — Cheng Yanqiu, Peking opera singer (b. 1904)
- March 15 — Wang Chonghui, jurist, diplomat and politician (b. 1881)
- June 21 — Liu Yazi, poet and political activist (b. 1887)
- August 26 — Ji Xingwen, nationalist lieutenant general (b. 1908)
- September 30 — Tang Feifan, medical microbiologist (b. 1897)
- October 17 — Zheng Zhenduo, journalist, writer, archaeologist and scholar (b. 1898)
- December 13 — Luo Changpei, linguist (b. 1899)

== See also ==
- 1958 in Chinese film
