= Li Xi (disambiguation) =

Li Xi (李希; born 1956) is the Secretary of the Central Commission for Discipline Inspection of the Chinese Communist Party.

Li Xi may also refer to:

- Li Xi (Tang dynasty) (李谿; died 895), Tang dynasty chancellor
- Li Xi, Prince of Yue (李係; died 762), son of Emperor Suzong of Tang
- Li Xi (politician, born 1962) (李喜), former Executive Vice-Mayor of Kunming
- Lì xì, the Vietnamese term for red envelopes
