= Jean Bouise =

French actor (1929–1989)

- Born: 3 June 1929; Le Havre, France
- Died: 6 July 1989 (aged 60); Lyon, France
- Occupation: Actor
- Years active: 1961–1989

Jean Bouise (3 June 1929 – 6 July 1989) was a French actor.

He was born in Le Havre. In the 1950s he helped to found Théâtre de la Cité, and was a player in the company. He entered films in the 1960s, and played supporting roles in The Shameless Old Lady, Z, L'Aveu, Out 1, The Return of the Tall Blond Man with One Black Shoe, Section spéciale, and Monsieur Klein. He received César nominations for his roles in Le vieux fusil and Le Juge Fayard dit Le Shériff, before winning the Best Supporting Actor award for Coup de tête. Subsequently, he appeared in Édith et Marcel, Le Dernier Combat, Subway, The Big Blue and La Femme Nikita. He died in Lyon.

== Filmography ==
Year	Title	Role	Director	Notes
1961	Flore et Blancheflore	The pontonnier	Jean Prat	TV movie
1963	El Otro Cristóbal		Armand Gatti	
1963	La foire aux cancres (Chronique d'une année scolaire)	The director	Louis Daquin	
1963	La meule	Simon	René Allio	Short
1964	I Am Cuba	Jim	Mikhail Kalatozov	
1964	Joyeuses commères de Windsor		Lazare Iglesis	TV movie
1964	Tintin and the Blue Oranges	Captain Haddock	Philippe Condroyer	
1965	The Shameless Old Lady	Alphonse	René Allio (2)	
1965	Ubu roi	Father Ubu	Jean-Christophe Averty	TV movie
1966	The War Is Over	Ramon	Alain Resnais	
1966	To Skin a Spy	Margeri	Jacques Deray	
1968	The Most Beautiful Month	The monk	Guy Blanc	
1969	Z	Georges Pirou	Costa-Gavras	
1969	Les hors-la-loi	Marc	Tewfik Fares	
1969	L'américain	The waiter	Marcel Bozzuffi	
1970	Le chien qui a vu Dieu	Defende Sapori	Paul Paviot	TV movie
1970	The Things of Life	François	Claude Sautet	
1970	The Confession	Boss of factory	Costa-Gavras (2)	
1971	Mourir d'aimer	The juvenile judge	André Cayatte	
1971	Les nouvelles aventures de Vidocq	Bargevillle's mayor	Marcel Bluwal	TV series (1 episode)
1971	Mon fils		François Martin	TV mini-series
1971	Rendezvous at Bray	The editor	André Delvaux	
1971	La Poudre d'escampette	The man on the terrace	Philippe de Broca	
1971	Out 1	Warok	Jacques Rivette; Suzanne Schiffman	
1971	Les bottes de sept lieues	The merchant	François Martin (2)	TV movie
1971	La mort des capucines	Durant	Agnès Delarive	TV movie
1972	Les camisards	The driver	René Allio (3)	
1972	Hearth Fires	Father Yves Bouteiller	Serge Korber	
1972	Plot	A police officer	Yves Boisset	
1972	Les caïds	Murelli	Robert Enrico	
1972	The Tall Blond Man with One Black Shoe	The minister	Yves Robert	
1973	The Burned Barns	Reporter	Jean Chapot	
1974	Out 1: Spectre		Jacques Rivette (2)	
1974	Un jeune homme seul	The bar's owner	Jean Mailland	TV movie
1974	Madame Bovary	Charles Bovary	Pierre Cardinal	TV movie
1974	The Return of the Tall Blond Man with One Black Shoe	The minister	Yves Robert (2)	
1975	The Common Man	Inspector Boulard	Yves Boisset (2)	
1975	Section spéciale	Councillor Linais	Costa-Gavras (3)	
1975	La brigade	Charles	René Gilson	
1975	Folle à tuer	Doctor S. Rosenfeld	Yves Boisset (3)	
1975	Le vieux fusil	François	Robert Enrico (2)	Nominated - César Award for Best Supporting Actor
1976	Monsieur Klein	The seller	Joseph Losey	
1976	Mado	André	Claude Sautet (2)	
1977	Le Juge Fayard dit Le Shériff	The Attorney General Arnould	Yves Boisset (4)	Nominated - César Award for Best Supporting Actor
1977	Le point de mire	Bob	Jean-Claude Tramont	
1977	Death of a Corrupt Man	Commissioner Pernais	Georges Lautner	
1977	Les dossiers de l'écran	Alexandre	Robert Enrico (3)	TV series (1 episode)
1978	Les petits câlins	Sophie's father	Jean-Marie Poiré	
1978	Butterfly on the Shoulder	Dr. Bavier	Jacques Deray (2)	
1978	Dirty Dreamer	Robert	Jean-Marie Périer	
1978	Les routes du sud	The farmer	Joseph Losey (2)	
1979	Coup de tête	The president Sivardière	Jean-Jacques Annaud	César Award for Best Supporting Actor
1979	Paco el seguro	Ambroise	Didier Haudepin	
1979	Carole		Dominique Maillet	Short
1980	Anthracite	The rector	Édouard Niermans	
1980	Les dossiers de l'écran	Gattier	Maurice Frydland	TV series (1 episode)
1980	Ferdinand		Dominique Maillet (2)	Short
1981	Un dessert pour Constance	M. Broccart	Sarah Maldoror	TV movie
1981	L'oeil de la nuit	Maxime Hermance		TV series (1 episode)
1981	Victor		Dominique Maillet (3)	Short
1981	Le voleur d'enfants	Herbin	François Leterrier	TV movie
1982	Le chagrin d'Ernst Loberlin	Police Commissioner	Christine Riche	Short
1982	Le voyageur imprudent	Judge Vigne	Pierre Tchernia	TV movie
1982	Mérette	Pastor Magnoux	Jean-Jacques Lagrange	TV movie
1982	Paris-Saint-Lazare	Paul Tasson	Marco Pico	TV mini-series
1982	Hécate	Vaudable	Daniel Schmid	
1982	L'épingle noire	Margonne	Maurice Frydland (2)	TV mini-series
1982	Bluff	The doctor	Philippe Bensoussan	Short
1988	The Big Blue	Uncle Louis	Luc Besson	
1990	La Femme Nikita	Ambassy attaché	Luc Besson	(final film role)

Awards
Preceded by Jacques Villeret for Robert et Robert	César Award for Best Actor in a Supporting Role; 1980 for Coup de tête	Succeeded by Jacques Dufilho for Un mauvais fils
