= List of Chinese films of the 1960s =

This is a list of films produced in China ordered by year of release in the 1960s. For an alphabetical listing of Chinese films see Category:Chinese films

== 1960 ==
Title	Chinese Title	Director	Actors	Genre	Notability
Daughter of the Dai People	摩雅泰	Xu Tao	Qin Yi	Drama	Alternate title: Moyatai
Guan Hanqing	关汉卿	Xu Tao	Ma Shiceng, Hong Xiannü, Wen Juefei	Historical Drama	Film is in Cantonese
Heros at Present	风流人物数今朝	Zhao Ming, Jiang Junchao, Yu Zhongying	Zhao Dan, Wang Danfeng, Qi Heng	Drama	
Legend of the Qiang People	羌笛頌	Zhang Xinshi	Zhang Yuan, Guo Zhenqing, Lin Na, Sun Yu	War	
The Magic Tulip	马兰花	Meng Yuan, Pan Wenzhuan	Wang Bei, Liu Angu	Fantasy	
Meng Long Sha	勐胧纱	Wang Ping, Yuan Xian	Wang Xingang, He Meiping	War	
Monkey Subdues the White-Boned Demon	孙悟空三大白骨精	Yang Xiaozhong	Liu Lingtong, Xiao Changshun, Qi Lingtong	Fantasy	Best Musical at the 1963 Hundred Flowers Awards
Peony Pavilion	游园惊梦	Xu Ke	Mei Lanfang, Yu Zhenfei, Yan Huiju	Kunqu Opera	Also known as: Sweet Dreams in the Garden
Red Eagles	红鹰	Wang Shaoyan, Wang Fengzhang	Tan Jiayan, Du Jiwen, Han Yujie	War	Also has musical scenes
A Revolutionary Family	革命家庭	Shui Hua	Yu Lan, Sun Daolin, Zhang Liang	Drama	Best Screenplay at the 1962 Hundred Flowers Awards, entered into the 2nd Moscow International Film Festival
Song of the Red Flag	红旗谱	Ling Zifeng	Cui Wei, Cai Songliu, Lu Fei (actor), Zhao Lian	Drama	Alternate title: Keep the Red Flag Flying. Best Actor (Cui Wei) and Best Cinematography at the 1962 Hundred Flowers Awards
The Sun Over Keshan Mountain	柯山红日	Dong Zhaoqi	Cui Yongchang, Dong Zhiyuan, Zhang Yuenan	War	Also has musical scenes
Surprise Attack	奇袭	Xu Youxin	Zhang Yongshou, Xing Jitian, Huang Huanguan	War	Korean War
Third Sister Liu (Liu Sanje)	刘三姐	Su Li	Huang Wanqiu, Liu Shilong	Musical	Best Cinematography, Best Sound, and Best Art Design at the 1963 Hundred Flowers Awards
Tracks in the Snowy Forest	林海雪原	Liu Peiran	Zhang Yongshou, Wang Runshen, Liang Zhipeng	War	Based on the novel by Qu Bo
A Weatherwoman	耕云播雨	Wei Rong	Yu Ping, Lu Fei, Yu Zhongyi, Wang Zhifang, Guo Shutian	Drama	
Women Generals of the Yang Family	杨门女将	Cui Wei, Chen Huaikai	Wang Jinghua, Yang Qiuling, Liang Youlian	Beijing Opera	Best Musical at the 1962 Hundred Flowers Awards

== 1961 ==
Title	Chinese Title	Director	Actors	Genre	Notability
Havoc in Heaven (Part I)	大闹天宫	Wan Laiming		Animation	Best Art Film at the 1963 Hundred Flowers Awards
Red Detachment of Women	红色娘子军	Xie Jin	Zhu Xijuan, Wang Xingang, Xiang Mei, Chen Qiang	War	Best Director (Xie Jin), Best Actress (Zhu Xijuan), and Best Supporting Actor (Chen Qiang) at the 1962 Hundred Flowers Awards
Spring Comes to the Withered Tree	枯木逢春	Zheng Junli	You Jia, Xu Zhihua	Drama	Alternate title: Withered Trees Revive
Spring Thunder	春雷	Ling Zifeng, Lü Peng	Wei Bingzhe, Hua Songru, Luo Minchi	Musical	

== 1962 ==
Title	Chinese Title	Director	Actors	Genre	Notability
Dreams of the Red Chambers	红楼梦	Cen Fan	Xu Yulan, Wang Wenjuan, Lü Ruiying	Drama/Musical	
Fire on the Plain	燎原	Zhang Junxiang, Gu Eryi	Wang Shangxin, Wang Xiyan	Drama	Alternate titles: Land Aflame and Prairie Fire
Li Shuangshuang	李双双	Lu Ren	Zhang Ruifang, Zhong Xinghuo, Zhang Wenrong	Drama	Best Film, Best Screenplay (Li Zhun), (Best Actress (Zhang Ruifang), and Best Supporting Actor (Zhong Xinghuo) at the 1963 Hundred Flowers Awards
Waves on the Southern Shore	南海潮	Cai Chusheng, Wang Weiyi	Wu Wenhua, Zhang Zheng	Drama	Alternate title: Waves on the South China Sea

== 1963 ==
Title	Chinese Title	Director	Actors	Genre	Notability
The Cowboy's Flute	牧笛	Te Wei, Qian Jiajun		Animation	Shanghai Animation Film Studio
Early Spring in February	早春二月	Xie Tieli	Sun Daolin, Shangguan Yunzhu, Xie Fang	Drama	
Serfs	农奴	Li Jun	Wang Dui, Qiang Ba	Drama	
Visitor on Ice Mountain	冰山上的来客	Zhao Xinshui	Liang Yin, Gu Yuying	Drama	Alternate title: Visitors on the Icy Mountain

== 1964 ==
Title	Chinese Title	Director	Actors	Genre	Notability
Doctor Bethune	白求恩大夫	Zhang Junxiang, Li Shutian, Gao Zheng	Gerald Tannenbaum, Cun Li, Ying Ruocheng	Biographical	Story of Norman Bethune's time in China in 1938-1939
Havoc in Heaven (Part II)	大闹天宫	Wan Laiming		Animated	
Heroic Sons and Daughters	英雄儿女	Wu Zhaodi	Tian Fang, Zhou Wenbin, Liu Shangxian	War	Changchun Film Studio production
Prairie Eagles	草原雄鹰	Ling Zifeng, Dong Kena	Abudulaheman Awazi, Nuernisha Simayi, Sa Deke	Drama	Alternate title: Eagles on the Grassland
Sentinels under the Neon Lights	霓虹灯下的哨兵	Wang Ping, Ge Gan	Xu Linge, Yuan Ye	Drama	
Two Stage Sisters	舞台姐妹	Xie Jin	Xie Fang, Cao Yindi, Shangguan Yunzhu	Drama	Shanghai Film Studio production

== 1965 ==
Title	Chinese Title	Director	Actors	Genre	Notability
The East Is Red	东方红	Wang Ping		Musical	
Living Forever in Burning Flames	烈火中永生	Shui Hua	Yu Lan, Zhao Dan, Zhang Ping	Drama	
Tunnel War	地道战	Ren Xudong	Zhu Longguang, Zhang Yongshou, Wang Bingyu	War	Alternate title: Tunnel Warfare

== 1968 ==
Title	Chinese Title	Director	Actors	Genre	Notability
A Great Statement	伟大声明			Animation	This short film was created to accompany Mao Zedong's statement made on 26 April 1968 supporting the struggle of African Americans. It was produced by Shanghai Animation Film Studio.

== Mainland Chinese film production totals ==
Year	Total Films
1960	63
1961	29
1962	34
1963	40
1964	32
1965	47
1966	15
1967	0
1968	1
1969	0

== See also ==
- Cinema of China
- Best 100 Chinese Motion Pictures as chosen by the 24th Hong Kong Film Awards
- List of Hong Kong films of the 1960s
- List of Taiwanese films

== Sources ==
- 中国影片大典 Encyclopaedia of Chinese Films. 1949.10-1976, 故事片·戏曲片. (2001). Zhong guo ying pian da dian: 1949.10-1976. Beijing: 中国电影出版社 China Movie Publishing House. ISBN 7-106-01508-3
- 中国艺术影片编目 China Art Film Catalog (1949-1979). (1981) Zhongguo Yi Shu Ying Pian Bian Mu (1949-1979). Beijing: 文化艺术出版社 Culture and Arts Press.
