= Jean Négroni =

French actor (1920–2005)

- Born: December 4, 1920; Constantine, French Algeria
- Died: May 28, 2005 (aged 84); L'Île-Rousse, Haute-Corse, France
- Occupation: Actor
- Years active: 1941–2003

Jean Négroni (4 December 1920 – 28 May 2005) was a French actor and theatre director particularly known for his voice work, such as his role as the narrator in La Jetée (1962).

== Biography ==
Jean Négroni was educated in theater by Albert Camus, and was an early companion of Jean Vilar at the Théâtre National Populaire and at the Festival d'Avignon. Négroni founded the Maison des arts et de la culture de Créteil at Créteil in 1968, and was its director until 1978.

Négroni's career was marked by his portrayal of Robespierre — first on an episode of the television program La caméra explore le temps, and later in the theater under the direction of Robert Hossein.

Négroni provided the voice of the narrator in La Jetée (1962) and also narrated Pierre Henry's concrete music album L'Apocalypse de Jean (1968).

== Partial filmography ==
- Premier rendez-vous (1941) - Un élève du collège (uncredited)
- Les inconnus dans la maison (1942) - (uncredited)
- Les cadets de l'océan (1945)
- Patrie (1946) - Un officier espagnol
- Un certain Monsieur Jo (1958)
- La Passe du diable (1958) - Récitant / Narrator (voice)
- Enclosure (1960) - David
- La Jetée (1962, Short) - Narrator (voice)
- L'escalier (1964) - Récitant / Narrator (voice)
- La Cage de verre (1965) - Pierre
- La Dame de pique (1965) - Comte de Saint-Germain
- Paris brûle-t-il? (1966) - Villon (uncredited)
- Le deuxième souffle (1966) - L'homme
- Dieu a choisi Paris (1969) - Récitant (voice)
- The Hunter Will Get You (1976) - Spitzer
- Pourquoi? (1977) - Le médecin
- I as in Icarus (1979) - Carlos de Palma, l'homme au parapluie
- Noces de sève (1979) - Jérôme Capdevielle
- Lénine (1982) - Vladimir Lenin
- Gramps Is in the Resistance (1983) - Récitant / Narrator (voice)
- Love Rites (1987) - Récitant / Narrator (voice)
