= La Jetée =

1962 French featurette

- Theatrical release poster
- Directed by: Chris Marker
- Written by: Chris Marker
- Produced by: Anatole Dauman
- Starring: Hélène Châtelain; Davos Hanich; Jacques Ledoux
- Narrated by: Jean Négroni
- Cinematography: Jean Chiabaut; Chris Marker
- Edited by: Jean Ravel
- Music by: Trevor Duncan
- Production company: Argos Films
- Distributed by: Argos Films
- Release date: 16 February 1962 (France)
- Running time: 28 minutes
- Country: France
- Languages: French; German

La Jetée (French pronunciation: [la ʒəte]; "The Pier") is a 1962 French science fiction featurette written and directed by Chris Marker and associated with the Left Bank artistic movement. Constructed almost entirely from still photos, it tells the stable time loop story of a post-nuclear war experiment in time travel. It is 28 minutes long and shot in black and white.

It won the Prix Jean Vigo for short film. The 1995 science fiction film 12 Monkeys was inspired by and borrows several concepts directly from La Jetée, as does the 2015 TV series of the same name.

== Plot ==
A man is a prisoner in the aftermath of World War III in post-apocalyptic Paris, where survivors live underground in the Palais de Chaillot galleries. Scientists research time travel, hoping to send test subjects to different time periods "to call past and future to the rescue of the present." They have difficulty finding subjects who can mentally withstand the shock of time travel. The scientists eventually settle upon the protagonist; his key to the past is a vague but obsessive memory from his pre-war childhood of a woman he had seen on the observation platform ("the jetty") at Orly Airport shortly before witnessing a startling incident there. He did not understand exactly what happened, but knew he had seen a man die.

After several attempts, he reaches the pre-war period. He meets the woman from his memory, and they develop a romantic relationship. After his successful passages to the past, the experimenters attempt to send him into the far future. In a brief meeting with the technologically advanced people of the future, he is given a power unit capable of regenerating his own destroyed society.

Upon his return, with his mission accomplished, he discerns that he is to be executed by his jailers. He is contacted by the people of the future, who offer to help him escape to their time permanently; however, he asks instead to be returned to the pre-war time of his childhood, hoping to find the woman again. He is returned to the past, placed on the jetty at the airport, and it occurs to him that the child version of himself is probably there as well. He is more concerned with locating the woman, and quickly spots her. However, as he rushes to her, he notices an agent of his jailers who has followed him and realizes the agent is about to kill him. In his final moments, he comes to understand that the incident he witnessed as a child, which has haunted him ever since, was his own death.

== Cast ==
- Jean Négroni as Narrator
- Hélène Châtelain as The Woman
- Davos Hanich as The Man
- Jacques Ledoux as The Experimenter
- Ligia Branice as Woman From The Future
- Janine Kleina as Woman From The Future
- William Klein as Man From The Future

== Production ==
La Jetée is constructed almost entirely from optically printed photographs playing out as a photomontage of varying rhythm. It contains only two brief shots of the woman mentioned above, about 4 seconds of her mouth opening and 20 seconds later about 6 seconds of her eyes opening and blinking, originating on a motion-picture camera, this due to the fact that Marker could only afford to hire one for an afternoon. The stills were taken with a Pentax Spotmatic and the motion-picture segment was shot with a 35 mm Arriflex. The film has no dialogue aside from small sections of muttering in German and people talking in an airport terminal. The story is told by a voice-over narrator. The scene in which the hero and the woman look at a cut-away trunk of a tree is a reference to Alfred Hitchcock's 1958 film Vertigo which Marker also references in his 1983 film Sans soleil.

The editing of La Jetée adds to the intensity of the film. With the use of cut-ins and fade-outs, it produces the eerie and unsettling nature adding to the theme of the apocalyptic destruction of World War III. Terry Gilliam, director of 12 Monkeys, describes the editing as "simply poetic" in the combination of editing and soundtrack that is used in the short film.

As the film plays out as a photomontage, the only continuous variable is the sound. The sound used in this production is minimal, showing up in the form of narration, orchestral score and sound effect. The rhythmic patterns of the soundtrack act as a framework to add to the intensity of the film. "The dissolve is synchronized with the sound. As the story moves from the past to the present, La Jetee creates mental continuity." The soundtrack adds to the illusion of movement within the film and the change of time.

== Interpretation ==
In Black and Blue, her study of postwar French fiction, Carol Mavor describes La Jetée as "taking place in a no-place (u-topia) in no-time (u-chronia)" which she connects to the time and place of the fairy tale. She further elaborates: "even the sound of the title resonates with the fairy-tale surprise of finding oneself in another world: La Jetée evokes 'là j'étais' (there I was)". By "u-topia", Mavor does not refer to "utopia" as the word is commonly used; she also describes an ambiguity of dystopia/utopia in the film: "It is dystopia with the hope of utopia, or is it utopia cut by the threat of dystopia."

Tor Books blogger Jake Hinkson summed up his interpretation in the title of an essay about the film, "There's No Escape Out of Time". He elaborated:

What [the protagonist] finds ... is that the past is never as simple as we wish it to be. To return to it is to realize that we never understood it. He also finds—and here it is impossible to miss Marker's message for his viewers—a person cannot escape from their own time, anyway. Try as we might to lose ourselves, we will always be dragged back into the world, into the here and now. Ultimately, there is no escape from the present.

Hinkson also addresses the symbolic use of imagery: "The Man is blindfolded with some kind of padded device and he sees images. The Man is chosen for this assignment because ... he has maintained a sharp mind because of his attachment to certain images. Thus a film told through the use of still photos becomes about looking at images." He further observes that Marker himself did not refer to La Jetée as a film, but as photo novel.

Yannis Karpouzis makes a structuralistic analysis on La Jetée, examining it as an intermedial artwork: Chris Marker creates an "archive" of objects and conditions that have a photographic quality of their own and they are followed by the same predicates as pictures. The dialogue between the media (photography and cinematography) and the filmic signifier (film stills, storyline and narration) is constantly in the backdrop.

== Reception and legacy ==
=== Release, awards, and recognition ===
In 1963, Prix Jean Vigo awarded La Jetée for "Best Short Film". That same year, La Jetée was included in the Locarno International Film Festival, the Trieste Science+Fiction Festival, and the Mannheim-Heidelberg International Film Festival. The film has since been included in several contemporary film festivals, including the Buenos Aires Festival Internacional de Cine Independiente in 2009, the "Cine//B Film Festival" in 2011, and the International Documentary Film Festival Amsterdam in 2019.

La Jetée was included by producer Steven Schneider in the 2003 film reference book 1001 Movies You Must See Before You Die. In 2010, Time ranked La Jetée first in its list of "Top 10 time-travel movies". In 2012, in correspondence with the Sight & Sound poll, the British Film Institute deemed La Jetée as the 50th greatest film of all time. In 2022, it took the spot of 67th greatest film on the Sight & Sound critics' poll, and 35th greatest film on the director's poll, respectively.

=== In popular culture ===
Science fiction writer William Gibson considers the film one of his main influences.

On November 8, 2022 the Chicago Fringe Opera staged a world-premiere concert performance of Seth Boustead and J. Robert Lennon's chamber opera adaptation of the film.

==== Music ====
The video for Sigue Sigue Sputnik's 1989 single "Dancerama" is an homage to La Jetée. The film is also one of the influences in the video for David Bowie's "Jump They Say" (1993).

The Chicago-based band Isotope 217 recorded the track "La Jetée" for their 1997 album The Unstable Molecule. On the 1998 album TNT, the post-rock band Tortoise, of which Isotope 217 is a side-project, featured an alternate version of the same song, titled "Jetty". Both are inspired by the film.

Kode9, in collaboration with Ms. Haptic, Marcel Weber (aka MFO), and Lucy Benson created an homage to La Jetée in 2011, for the Unsound Festival.

Northern Irish rock band Two Door Cinema Club screened the film at the launch party for their 2016 album Gameshow. The final track on the album, "Je viens de la", is inspired by La Jetée and describes the journey of the film's protagonist.

==== Film ====
Terry Gilliam's 12 Monkeys (1995) was inspired by and takes several concepts directly from La Jetée (acknowledging this debt in the opening credits). The 2003 short film La puppé is both an homage to and a parody of La Jetée.

The 2007 Mexican film Year of the Nail, which is told entirely through still photographs, was inspired by La Jetée. The 2018 Spanish film Entre Oscuros Sueños, where the still-image movie concept is also used, was entirely inspired by La Jetée. Friend of the World, a two-hander film, was inspired by La Jetée, among others.

Brazilian director Kleber Mendonça Filho made two short films "Vinil Verde" and "Jogo sem Gandula" both of which use the still frame technique from La Jetée

==== Games ====
Leonard Boyarsky, the art director of the initial installment of the Fallout series, was influenced by the look of the technology in La Jetée.

== Related media ==
In 1992, Zone Books released a book which reproduced the film's original images along with the script in both English and French.

== Home media ==
In Region 2, the film is available with English subtitles in the La Jetée/Sans soleil digipack released by Arte Video. In Region 1, the Criterion Collection has released a La Jetée/Sans soleil combination DVD / Blu-ray, which features the option of hearing the English or French narration.

== See also ==
- Filmstrip
- List of cult films
- Time travel in films
- List of films featuring time loops
- The Glass Fortress (similar still image film style)
