= Kukuli =

1961 film

- Directed by: Luis Figueroa; Eulogio Nishiyama; César Villanueva
- Written by: Luis Figueroa; César Villanueva
- Starring: Judith Figueroa
- Release date: 27 July 1961
- Running time: 63 minutes
- Country: Peru
- Languages: Quechua; Spanish

Kukuli (Quechua for white-winged dove) is a 1961 Peruvian drama film directed by Luis Figueroa, Eulogio Nishiyama and Cesar Villanueva. It was entered into the 2nd Moscow International Film Festival. It was the first film to be spoken in the Quechua language.

== Cast ==
- Judith Figueroa as Kukuli
- Victor Chambi as Alaku
- Lizardo Pérez as Ukuku
- Emilio Galli as Cura
- Felix Valeriano as Machula (Grandpa)
- Martina Mamani as Mamala (Grandma)
- Simón Champi as Brujo
- Mercedes Yupa as Mercedescha
- Eduardo Navarro as Narrator
