= Jiang Zhuyun =

Chinese revolutionary (1920–1949)

- 江竹筠
- Born: Jiang Zhujun; 20 August 1920; Zigong, Sichuan
- Died: 14 November 1949 (aged 29); Geleshan, Chongqing
- Other name: Sister Jiang
- Political party: Chinese Communist Party

Jiang Zhuyun (Chinese: 江竹筠; pinyin: Jiāng Zhúyún; 20 August 1920 – 14 November 1949) was a Chinese communist revolutionary. She is the basis of the character of Jiang Xueqin, or "Sister Jiang" (Chinese: 江姐; pinyin: Jiāng Jiě) in the semi-fictional novel Red Crag.

== Life ==
She was born Jiang Zhujun (江竹君) in Jiangjiawan, Dashanpu, Zigong, Sichuan province. She moved after a drought struck their area and her mother asked for help from her brother who lived in Chongqing. When her grandmother died they were able to move out of her uncle's house. He was well off, whilst her family had difficulty living on her father's wage and her mother's job. Her father sent money home as he was a sailor, Jiang attended a church school and in 1939 started to attend university. She joined the Chinese Communist Party (CCP). She was assigned an undercover role where she was required to appear as the wife of Peng Pongwu. He already had a wife called Tan Zhenglun, but nonetheless they were unsuccessful in keeping their relationship strictly professional.

In 1944, the CCP arranged for her to attend Sichuan University. There she worked secretly and she not only studied Russian but she read Russian media and books. She was allowed to marry Peng Pongwu in 1945. The following year their son was born.

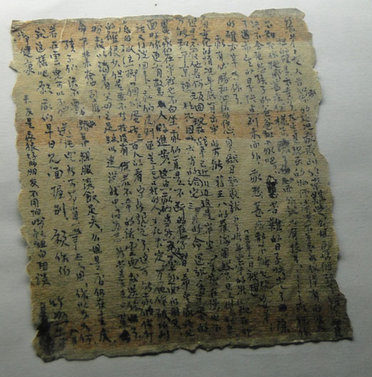
A letter written by Jiang Zhuyun

Peng was leading a group of guerrillas when he was killed in 1948 and she took on his role. She left her son with Peng's first wife and led the group. Another revolutionary was captured and gave her name to her captors.

She was arrested in Wanxian and then imprisoned in Zhazidong Concentration Camp. She was tortured but she kept all her knowledge secret. She did manage to send out a letter, which is now at the Three Gorges Museum in Chongqing. A quote from it says "Tortures are too small tasks for the Communists. Bamboo sticks are made of bamboo, but the will of the Communists is made of iron and steel". The letter is said to have inspired many to make generous donations to the CCP. She was killed on November 14, 1949, just 16 days before Chongqing was captured by the Communists.

== Literary and artistic representations ==
'Sister Jiang', a key character in the popular novel Red Crag (1961), is based on Jiang Zhuyun. The character also features in many adaptations of the novel, including:

- Sister Jiang (1964), a Chinese-language western-style opera
- Eternity in Flames (1965), a film directed by Shui Hua
- Sister Jiang (2010), a CCTV-1 television series
