= Dorothy Knowles (academic) =

British academic (1906–2010)

- Born: 28 March 1906; Johannesburg, South Africa
- Died: 10 November 2010 (aged 104); London, England
- Occupations: Academic and fencer
- Years active: 1934–2010
- Spouse: John Stephenson Spink

Dorothy Knowles (28 March 1906 – 10 November 2010) was a British academic, known to her friends as Diana. She was an analyst of French drama who taught at Liverpool University from 1934 to 1967. She was also an accomplished fencer. Knowles is known to historians of British cinema for her 1934 book The Censor, the Drama and the Film, in which she criticised the British Board of Film Censors for what she regarded as unaccountable political censorship. In 1989 she published a study of the work of the playwright Armand Gatti.

== Biography ==
Knowles was born in Johannesburg. Her father was a mining engineer, and, after his death in 1911, the family moved to England, specifically Leeds, in order to deal with the family's finances. Although the family intended to move back to South Africa, the outbreak of World War I meant they could not do so. As a child, Knowles danced alongside Marie Lloyd and Lupino Lane. She was also a fencer, and, in 1936, was the founder of the Liverpool University Fencing Club. Knowles continued fencing well into her 70s.

== Academic career ==
Knowles was an expert on French theater, and perhaps her most important work was French Drama of Inter-War Years 1918-39. Both she and her husband were intermittent lecturers at both Leningrad and Moscow universities. Knowles retired from her position at Liverpool University in 1984 and began spending more time in France. There, she discovered playwright Armand Gatti, and was working on a translation of his work when she died.
