= Enclosure (film) =

1961 film

- Directed by: Armand Gatti
- Written by: Armand Gatti; Pierre Joffroy
- Produced by: Lado Vilar
- Starring: Hans Christian Blech
- Cinematography: Robert Juillard
- Release date: July 1961
- Running time: 105 minutes
- Countries: France; Yugoslavia
- Language: French

Enclosure (French: L'Enclos) is a 1961 French–Yugoslav drama film directed by Armand Gatti. It was entered into the 2nd Moscow International Film Festival where Gatti won the Silver Prize for Best Director.

In French, the term "enclos" translates to "enclosure" in English, indicating a fenced or walled-in area commonly found surrounding factories or schools. It may also denote a pen, compound, paddock, or run. The film "Enclosure" delves into the themes associated with enclosed spaces and their influence on individuals and communities, rendering it a pertinent and contemplative piece in contemporary society.

== Cast ==
- Hans Christian Blech as Karl
- Jean Négroni as David
- Herbert Wochinz as Scheller
- Tamara Miletic as Anna
- Maks Furijan as Weissenborn
- Stevo Žigon as Dragulavic
- Janez Vrhovec as Walter (as Janez Vrkovec)
- Michel Bouyer as Doctor Crémieux
- Janez Skof as Kapo #1
- Janez Cuk as Kapo #2
- Janko Hocevar as Jova
- Pero Kvrgić as Sanchez
- Lojze Potokar as Police Officer
- Frane Milčinski as Wagner
