= Mihály Szemes =

Hungarian film director

- Born: 23 July 1920; Budapest, Hungary
- Died: 3 October 1977 (aged 57); Budapest, Hungary
- Occupation: Film director
- Years active: 1947–1973

Mihály Szemes (23 July 1920 – 3 October 1977) was a Hungarian film director. He directed nineteen films between 1947 and 1973. His 1961 film Alba Regia was entered into the 2nd Moscow International Film Festival where it won the Silver Prize.

== Selected filmography ==
- Underground Colony (1951)
- Dani (1957)
- Alba Regia (1961)
