= Alba Regia (film) =

1961 film

- Directed by: Mihály Szemes
- Written by: György Palásthy
- Starring: Tatiana Samoilova
- Cinematography: Barnabás Hegyi
- Release date: 30 March 1961
- Running time: 90 minutes
- Country: Hungary
- Language: Hungarian

Alba Regia is a 1961 Hungarian drama film directed by Mihály Szemes, based on a short story by Béla Levai and Tamás Sipos. It was entered into the 2nd Moscow International Film Festival where it won the Silver Prize.

== Cast ==
- Tatiana Samoilova as Alba
- Miklós Gábor as Hajnal
- Imre Ráday as Konrád
- Hédi Váradi as Nurse
- Ferenc Bessenyei as Soviet major
- Imre Sinkovits as Gestapo officer
- József Kautzky as Helmuth
