= El Otro Cristóbal =

1963 film

- Directed by: Armand Gatti
- Written by: Armand Gatti
- Starring: Bertina Acevedo; Jean Bouise
- Cinematography: Henri Alekan
- Release date: 1963
- Running time: 115 minutes
- Country: Cuba
- Language: Spanish

El Otro Cristóbal is a 1963 drama, fantasy Cuban film written and directed by Armand Gatti. It was entered into the 1963 Cannes Film Festival.

== Cast ==
- Bertina Acevedo
- Jean Bouise
- Pierre Chaussat
- Marc Dudicourt
- Alden Knight
- Eslinda Núñez
- Carlos Ruiz de la Tejera

== See also ==
- List of Cuban films
