= Yiling Senior High School =

Secondary school in China

Coordinates: 30.6978°N 111.3133°E

Yiling Senior High School is a public secondary school in Yichang, Hubei, China.

Established in 1962, the school covers 90,000 square meters with a floor area of 40,000 square meters. The school consists of four main parts: teaching and living areas, a playground, and a Baicao Garden. The school has been successively evaluated as a Key High School and a Demonstrative School of the Hubei Province.

The school currently has 45 classes with 181 teachers and 2800 students.
