= Zhu Xingliang =

- Born: 1959 (age 66–67)
- Education: Suzhou University of Science and Technology
- Occupations: Founder, Suzhou Gold Mantis Construction Decoration
- Spouse: married
- Children: 1

Zhu Xingliang (Chinese: 朱兴良; born 1959) is a Chinese entrepreneur, the founder of Suzhou Gold Mantis Construction Decoration, an interior design and decoration company.

== Early life ==
Zhu was born in 1959, and graduated from Suzhou University of Science and Technology in 1987.

== Career ==
Zhu founded Suzhou Gold Mantis Construction Decoration, an interior design and decoration company.

== Personal life ==
He is married with one child and lives in Suzhou, China.
