= Yunnan Arts University =

University in Kunming, China

Coordinates: 24.8320°N 102.8245°E

- 云南艺术学院
- Motto: 务实、求新、尚美
- Motto in English: Pragmatism, Innovation, and Aesthetic Pursuit
- Type: Public
- Established: 1959; 67 years ago
- Academic affiliations: China-ASEAN Art Universities Alliance, China-Russia Art Universities Alliance, China-CEEC Dance Culture and Arts Alliance, China Higher Drama Education Alliance, China Stage Art Education Alliance, Chinese Government Scholarship Recipient Institution for International Students, National Cultural Quality Education Base for University Students, and Accredited Social Art Level Evaluation Institution.
- Location: Kunming, Yunnan, China
- Campus: 62 hectares (150 acres); Urban
- Website: www.ynart.edu.cn

Yunnan Arts University (YAU; 云南艺术学院; 云艺) is a provincial public higher education institution for the arts located in Kunming, Yunnan, China. It is approved by the Ministry of Education of the People's Republic of China and administered by the Yunnan Provincial People's Government. The university is one of the eight comprehensive higher art institutions in China.

== History ==
The history of Yunnan Arts University (YAU) can be traced back to 1938, originating from the Normal College and the Department of Cultural Affairs of the National Southwest Associated University. The main foundation of the university was established in 1959 as Yunnan Arts University. In 1963, Yunnan Arts University was dissolved, and its departments were incorporated into the Faculty of Arts at Kunming Normal College. In 1980, Yunnan Arts University regained its independence from Kunming Normal College, becoming an autonomous higher education institution.

== Scale ==
Yunnan Arts University (YAU) operates two campuses, Chenggong and Mayuan, with a combined area of over 930 mu (approximately 62.03 hectares). The university consists of 12 academic units and one affiliated arts school. It accommodates nearly 10,000 full-time students and has a faculty and staff body of 877 members. The total area of teaching and administrative facilities amounts to 258,900 m^{2} (2,787,000 sq ft). The university library holds 1.0206 million printed books and 508,500 electronic journals.

== Academic Departments ==
=== Teaching Units ===
- School of Music
- School of Fine Arts
- School of Design
- School of Drama
- School of Dance
- School of Film and Television
- School of Arts Management
- College of Vocational and Continuing Education
- School of Marxism
- Department of General Education
- Department of Physical Education
- Institute of Ethnic Arts
- School of Aesthetic Education
- International College
- School of Modern Industries
- Affiliated Arts School

=== Auxiliary Teaching and Research Institutions ===
- Development Research Center
- Journal Editorial Office
- Library
- Archives
- Arts Practice Center
- Teaching Evaluation and Quality Assurance Center
- University History Museum and Ethnic Arts Museum

== Academic Disciplines ==
- Two primary disciplines: Arts and Design
- Five professional categories: Music, Dance, Drama and Film, Fine Arts and Calligraphy, and Design

== Ranking and Reputation ==
Yunnan Arts University (YAU) is one of the 30 independently established art universities in China and is among the eight comprehensive higher art institutions in the country.

According to the 2024 Best Chinese Majors Ranking (BCMR) by Shanghai Ranking, YAU’s programmes in Drama Studies, Dance Performance, and Intangible Cultural Heritage Protection are ranked third nationally.

In terms of research, YAU currently undertakes three major projects funded by the National Social Science Foundation of China and has been awarded 12 projects under the National Social Science Foundation for Arts, ranking second nationwide among higher education institutions.
