= Yu Lan =

Chinese actress (1921–2020)

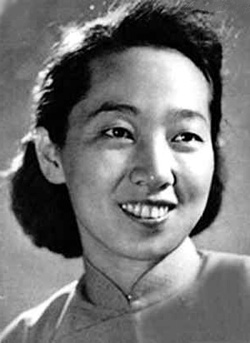
- Born: Yu Peiwen; 3 June 1921; Xiuyan, Liaoning, China
- Died: 28 June 2020 (aged 99); Beijing, China
- Occupation: Actress
- Years active: 1938–2020
- Spouse: Tian Fang
- Children: Tian Zhuangzhuang
- Awards: Golden Phoenix Awards; 1995 Honorary Award; 2005 Lifetime Achievement Award; Moscow Film Festival; Best Actress; 1962 A Revolutionary FamilyGolden Rooster Awards – 2009 Lifetime Achievement Award

Chinese name
- Traditional Chinese: 于藍
- Simplified Chinese: 于蓝
Transcriptions
Standard Mandarin
- Hanyu Pinyin: Yú Lán

Yu Lan (Chinese: 于蓝; pinyin: Yú Lán; 3 June 1921 – 28 June 2020) was a Chinese film actress. In 1961, Yu won the award for Best Actress at the 2nd Moscow International Film Festival for her performance in A Revolutionary Family. Her youngest son is Chinese director and Beijing Film Academy professor Tian Zhuangzhuang.

== Life ==
Yu was born 1921 in Xiuyan, Liaoning as Yu Peiwen (Chinese: 于佩文). She entered Counter-Japanese Military and Political University in 1938 and worked as an actress at a company affiliated with Luxun Academy of Arts after 1940.

She died in Beijing on 28 June 2020, aged 99.

== Filmography ==
Year	English Title	Chinese Title	Role	Notes
1949	Medical Warrior	白衣战士		
1951	Red Flag	翠岗红旗		
1952	Longxugou	龙须沟	Madam Cheng	
1961	A Revolutionary Family	革命家庭	Zhou Lian	Moscow Film Festival for Best Actress
1965	Eternity in Flames	烈火中永生	Jiang Jie	
2009	Looking For Jackie			
2018	Goddesses in the Flames of War			
2019	For Love with You			
