= Lu Dachang =

- Born: 1889; Linxia County, Linxia Hui Autonomous Prefecture, Gansu
- Died: October 1, 1962 (aged 72–73) Lanzhou, Gansu
- Allegiance: Republic of China
- Branch: National Revolutionary Army
- Rank: Lieutenant General
- Conflicts: Chinese Civil War

Lu Dachang (Chinese: 鲁大昌) (1889–1962) courtesy name Songling (Chinese: 嵩龄) was a Kuomintang general from Gansu. In 1911 he was in Shaanxi province.

He was born in Gansu in 1889. He went to Hunan province in 1915, where he was promoted to company commander. Lu returned to Gansu in 1921. He was promoted to commander of the Infantry 3rd Battalion of the 1st Regiment in 1922. In the spring of 1926, the Zhili clique attacked the Northwest Army defending Dingxi. Promoted in 1927 to commander of the regiment. In 1931, he was promoted to commander of the 14th Division of the National Revolutionary Army, in charge of Min County, Longxi County, Wen County, Wushan County, Xihe County, Li County and Gangu County.

== Chinese Civil War ==
In September 1935, Lu fought the forces of the Chinese Red Army led by Lin Biao and Nie Rongzhen in Gannan. On August 25, 1937, he executed the son and daughter-in-law of Tibetan Tusi Yang Jiqing.
