= Five Goods Movement =

The Five Goods Movement (五好活动 wuhao huodong) was a political campaign carried out in the People's Republic of China (PRC) from 1956 to 1959 that reflected the PRC State's vision of the role of housewives and "family dependents" (家属 jiashu) within China's emerging socialist order. The movement began in earnest in early 1956, when the All-China Women's Federation in tandem with local branches of the Women's Federation began promoting "Five Goods" for urban housewives to aspire to. These "five goods" intended to promote socialist development primarily through the education of children and support of industrial workers. The five tenets of the campaign were to encourage housewives to: promote mutual assistance between neighborhood households, arrange domestic life well, educate children well, encourage and support the production, work, and study of (male) spouses, and to study well themselves. This model of the ideal housewife reflected PRC visions of how a seemingly "non-productive" member of socialist society could contribute to the building of a socialist state.

The "Five Goods Movement" primarily encouraged the practice of thrift and frugality within families and the promotion of mothers as socialist educators of children. Numerous articles from the People's Daily during this period reflect these aims of the "Five Goods Movement," praising housewives who frugally managed their families' food supplies and provided an orderly domestic space which enabled children and husbands to earnestly study socialist political texts.

Although the Five Goods Movement initially focused on urban "family dependents" (家属 jiashu), the campaign eventually spread to rural areas, and added the promotion of sanitary practices as one of the "five goods" for rural housewives to practice in their everyday lives. The primary strategy for promotion of this five goods campaign was the naming of "model housewives" called "five goods activists" (五好妇女积极分子 wuhao jijifenzi) who provided an example of socialist domestic values for local women to aspire to.

The "Five Goods" campaign began in early 1956 and was continually mentioned in the People's Daily (the National Newspaper of the People's Republic of China) through 1960, although the height of the campaign occurred from 1956 to 1958.
