= Zhu Minzhu =

Chinese fencer

Personal information
- Full name: Chinese: 竺 敏珠; pinyin: Zhú Mǐn-zhū
- Born: 9 June 1962 (age 64)

Sport
- Sport: Fencing

Zhu Minzhu (born 9 June 1962) is a Chinese fencer. She competed in the women's team foil event at the 1984 Summer Olympics.
