= Chant public devant deux chaises électriques =

1966 play by Armand Gatti

- Written by: Armand Gatti
- Original language: French

Premiere
- Date premiered: January 17, 1966
- Place premiered: Théâtre National Populaire, Paris

Chant public devant deux chaises électriques (Public Canto Before Two Electric Chairs) is a play by Armand Gatti written in 1964 and premiered in 1966 at the Théâtre National Populaire. The subject is the Sacco and Vanzetti affair. It made headlines, and was panned by some critics but praised as a masterpiece by others, such as Gérard Guillot.

== Bibliography ==
- Laura Bellina, Le Chant public d’Armand Gatti, Università Ca’Foscari, Venise, Italie, 1971
- Jérémy Mahut, La Représentation de l’Anarchie comme exemple de Théâtre-témoignage : dans Chant public devant deux chaises électriques, pièce d’Armand Gatti, Morte accidentale di un anarchico, pièce de Dario Fo et Gods of the lightning, pièce de Maxwell Anderson, université de Reims, 2007
- Gérard Guillot, Chant public devant deux chaises électriques d'Armand Gatti, au TNP. Notre agonie, c'est notre triomphe, Les Lettres françaises no. 1117, 1966-02-03, pp. 16–17
- Rilliard, Gaëlle. "Hélène Châtelain - L'individu dans l'histoire". film-documentaire.fr.
- Knowles, Dorothy (1989). Armand Gatti in the Theatre: Wild Duck Against the Wind. Fairleigh Dickinson University Press. p. 117. ISBN 978-0-8386-3371-7.
