= Di Li Feng =

Di Li Feng, born 1958, is a Chinese contemporary artist, now working as Professor in the Lu Xun Academy of Fine Arts, in China. Born in a small Chinese town, he graduated from the Chinese Central Academy of Fine Arts, the highest artistic institution in China, from where he took a postgraduate degree in 1990. However, his paintings rapidly brought him to the attention of art collectors outside China.

Di Li Feng's oils have now been exhibited extensively in America, and particularly in Los Angeles and New York. Professor Di has also lectured at a number of American universities. In his work, Professor Di aims to combine the reality of a concrete object with the atmosphere created by an abstract texture and background. He has a particular admiration for the glories of China's imperial past, which forms the basis for many of his paintings, and he declares that he is "enchanted by its honour or disgrace, its tragedies, sadness, sentimentality and great joys".
