= Pu Zhongjie =

Chinese businessman and entrepreneur (born 1963)

- Born: January 16, 1963 (age 63)
- Occupations: Businessman & Entrepreneur
- Title: Founder of Lepu Group Co. Ltd

Pu Zhongjie (Chinese: 蒲忠杰; born January 16, 1963) is a Chinese businessman and entrepreneur. He founded the pharmaceutical company Lepu Group Co. Ltd. in 1998, and now serves as its Chairman, President, Technical director, Controller, and general manager. According to Hurun Report's China Rich List 2013, Pu has an estimated personal fortune of $370 million, and was the 849th richest person in China.

== Career ==
In 1999, Pu founded Lepu Medical Technology (Beijing) Co. Ltd. with joint funding by WP Medical Technologies Inc. and Luoyang Ship Material Research Institute. He is also the executive director of Beijing Target Medical Technologies Co. Ltd.; Lepu Medical Technology (Beijing) Co. Ltd.; Shanghai Shape Memory alloy Material Co. Ltd.; the director of the Chinese Society of Biotechnology (CSBT); vice president of the Interventional Engineering Committee of CSBT; and a member of the Changping CPPCC committee.

Pu's net worth is c. ¥3.8 billion, mostly from appreciation in the price of his company's stock, which makes him the richest man in the Growth Enterprise Market.

== Awards ==
Pu has won the Beijing Overseas Returnee Entrepreneur Award, the Constructor and Outstanding Entrepreneur of Socialism with Chinese Characteristics Award, and was selected as an "Excellent Overseas Returnee" in 2009.
