= Hu Zhaoyun =

Chinese entrepreneur (born 1963)

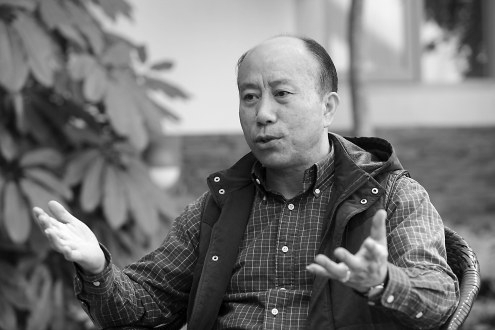
Mr. Hu Zhaoyun

Hu Zhaoyun (Chinese: 胡昭云; born November 1963) is an entrepreneur & industrialist in the People's Republic of China, CPPCC committee member, philanthropist and the President & Chairman of Yunli Group and Dajiang Investment & Development Corporation.

On 23 December 2007, Mr. Hu Zhaoyun was nominated "Backbone of the Republic of China - Public Welfare Top Ten Outstanding Contributors" by China Public Welfare Committee.

At the National Committee of the Chinese People's Political Consultative Conference 2013 (CPPCC) Mr. Hu Zhaoyun recommended stringent laws and punishments for criminals using minors for commercial profiting and drug trafficking.
