= Chinese Cinema: Culture and Politics since 1949 =

1988 non-fiction book by Paul Clark

- Author: Paul Clark
- Publisher: Cambridge University Press
- Publication date: 1987

Chinese Cinema: Culture and Politics since 1949 is a 1988 non-fiction book by Paul Clark, published by Cambridge University Press.

It discusses films produced by the Chinese Communist Party and groups with its ideology beginning in 1934, and through the time it established the People's Republic of China. The book's coverage ends in the year 1984.

== Contents ==
The chapters are ordered in a chronological manner. The author chose to use the dates 1964-1978 for the Cultural Revolution chapter as the Communist authorities had, in 1964, issued public criticism of several film works.

== Reception ==
W. J. F. Jenner, in China Quarterly, praised the book for not using "monstrous language of the higher film criticism" in film criticism sections, and instead using "brevity and unpretentiousness", with a "clear" organization and "quiet and reasonable" tone. They criticized "weakness" in the book's analyses and the book failing to "go deeply enough into either the culture or the politics of the Chinese film world."

Colin Mackerras of Griffith University called the book a "first-rate study" and that the "documentation and bibliography are superb." He stated that the book should have had a conclusion section and not a postscript section.
