= Anhui University of Chinese Medicine =

University in Hefei, Anhui, China

- 安徽中医药大学
- Motto: 至精至誠 惟是惟新
- Type: Public university
- Established: 1959
- President: Peng Daiyin
- Academic staff: 300
- Students: 8,000
- Location: Hefei, Anhui, China
- Campus: Meishanlu Campus, Shaoquanhu Campus
- Colours
- Nickname: AUCM
- Website: www.ahtcm.edu.cn/

Anhui University of Chinese Medicine (AHUTCM, simplified Chinese: 安徽中医药大学; traditional Chinese: 安徽中醫藥大學; pinyin: Ānhuī Zhōngyīyào Dàxué) is a comprehensive public university based in Hefei, Anhui province, China. The university provides programmes in traditional Chinese medicine as well as in the fields of technology, engineering, management and economics.

== History ==
The university was founded 1959. The university inherited two Chinese medical traditions within the province. The first tradition originates from southern Anhui which is called Xin'an. The other tradition originates from northern Anhui and is called Huatuo. These traditions have formed the basis of the university's traditional Chinese medicine offerings.

In 1996 Anhui University of Traditional Chinese Medicine was approved by the state council to enroll foreign students. In 1997 approval was also given to receive students from Hong Kong, Macao and Taiwan. In 2013, it has been given the name as Anhui University of Chinese Medicine while before it holds Anhui College of Traditional Chinese Medicine.

== Administration ==
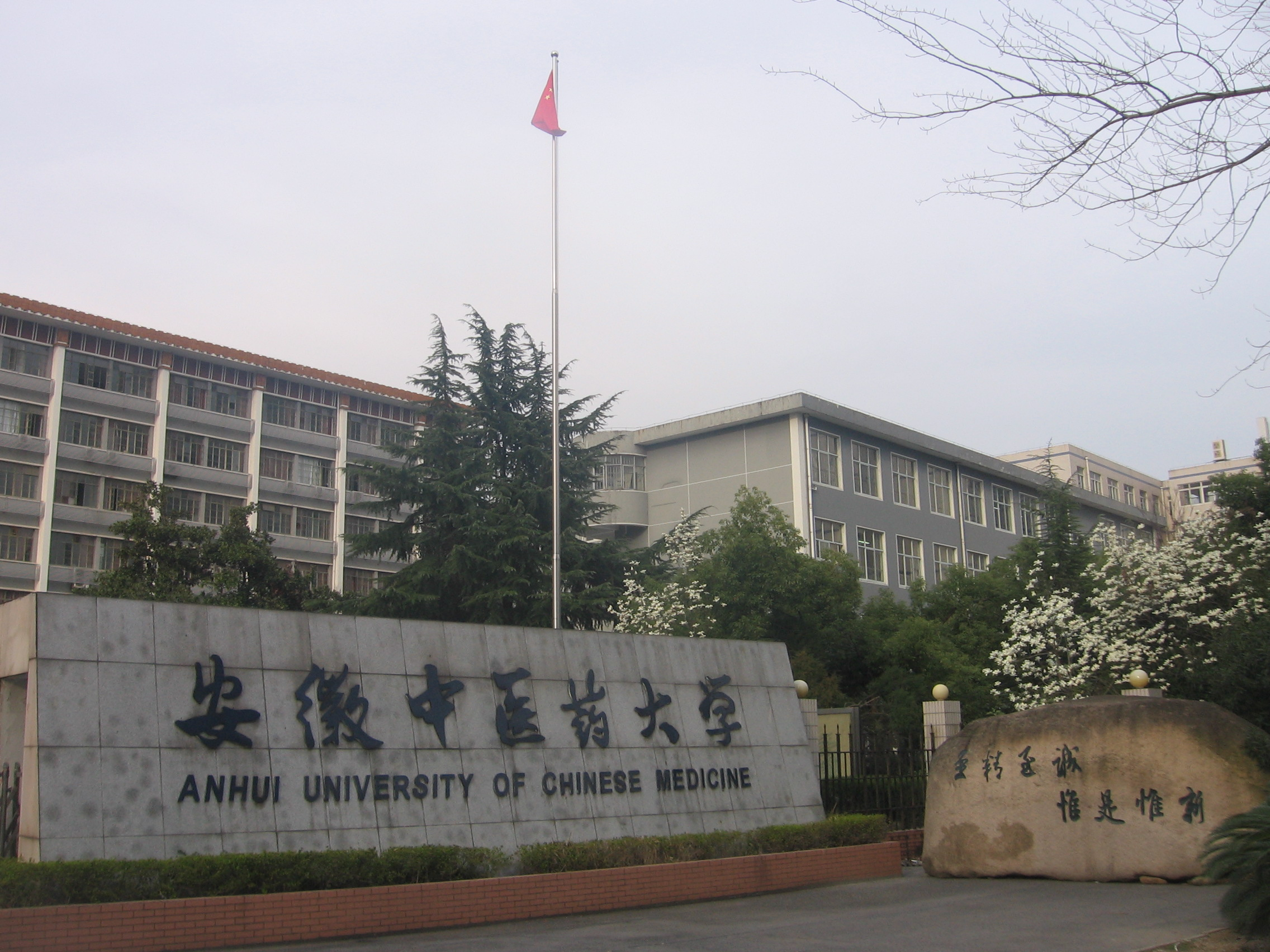
Main Entrance

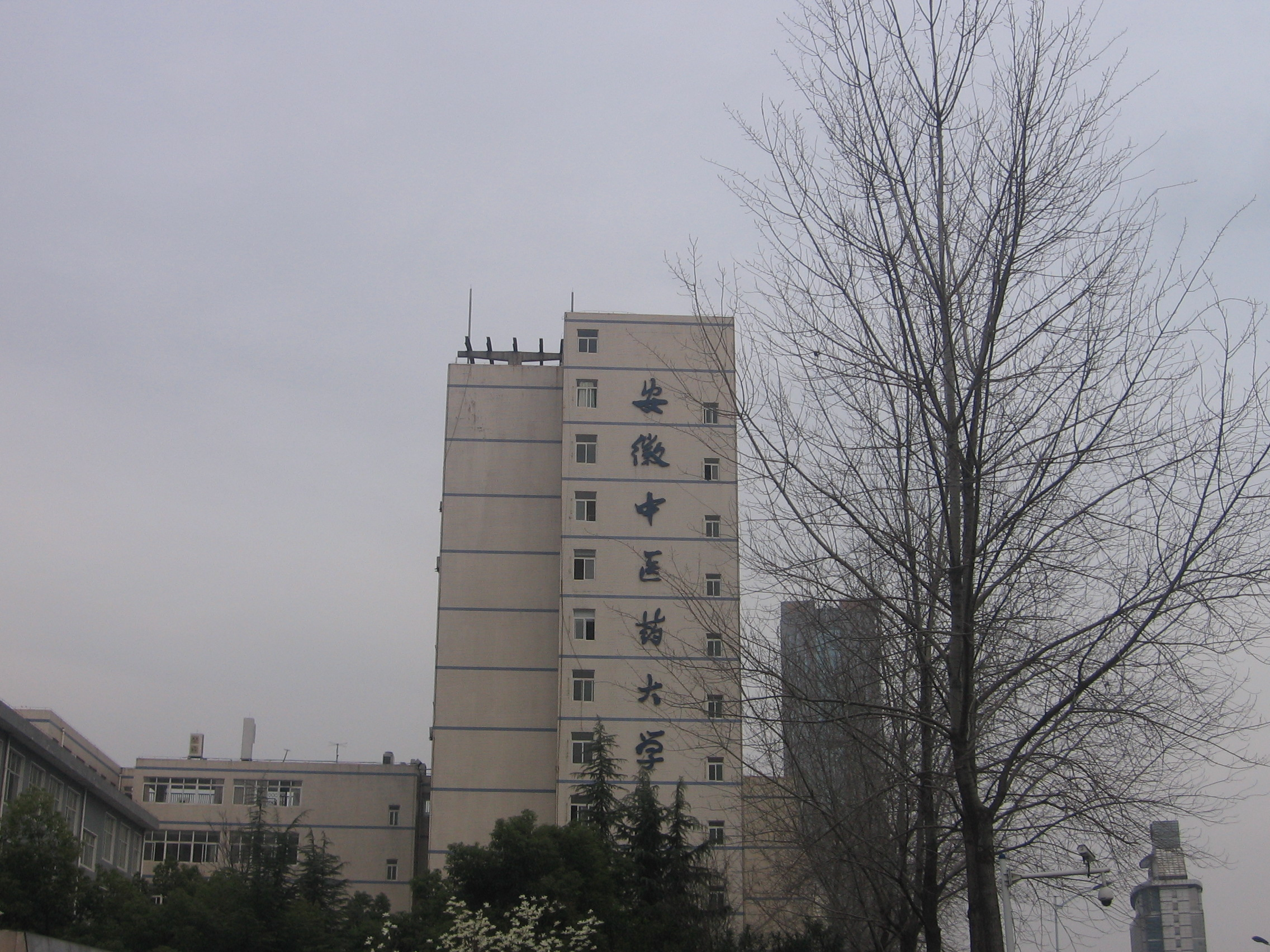
Main Building

=== Schools and Departments ===
The university faculty structure is organized into the following divisions:

- School of Traditional Chinese Medicine
- School of Acupuncture & Osteology
- School of Integrated Traditional Chinese & Western Medicine
- School of Pharmacy
- School of Nursing
- School of Medical Economics & Management
- School of Medical Information Technology
- The 1st Affiliated Hospital (The Hospital of Traditional Chinese Medicine)
- The 2nd Affiliated Hospital (The Hospital of Acupuncture & Tuina)
- The Affiliated Hospital of Integrated Traditional Chinese & Western Medicine
- The Affiliated Neurological Hospital
