= 2nd Moscow International Film Festival =

Film festival

- Location: Moscow, Soviet Union
- Founded: 1959
- Awards: Grand Prix
- Festival date: 9–23 July 1961
- Website: http://www.moscowfilmfestival.ru

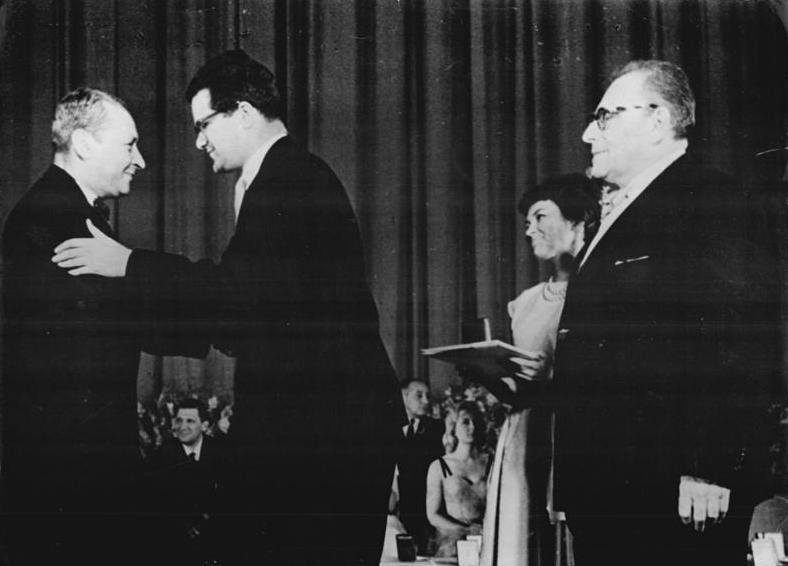
Closing ceremony of the 2nd International Film Festival - Gold medal for "Professor Mamlock".

The 2nd Moscow International Film Festival was held from 9 to 23 July 1961. The Grand Prix was shared between the Japanese film The Naked Island directed by Kaneto Shindo and the Soviet film Clear Skies directed by Grigori Chukhrai.

== Jury ==
- Sergei Yutkevich (USSR - President of the Jury)
- Chinghiz Aitmatov (USSR)
- Zoltán Várkonyi (Hungary)
- Luchino Visconti (Italy)
- Sergei Gerasimov (USSR)
- Karel Zeman (Czechoslovakia)
- Mehboob Khan (India)
- Joshua Logan (USA)
- Léon Moussinac (France)
- Roger Manvell (Great Britain)
- Francisco Piña (Mexico)
- Walieddin Youssef Samih (Egypt)
- Jerzy Toeplitz (Poland)
- Huang Guang (China)
- Michael Tschesno-Hell (East Germany)
- Liviu Ciulei (Romania)
- Borislav Sharaliev (Bulgaria)

== Films in competition ==
The following films were selected for the main competition:

English title	Original title	Director(s)	Production country
Alba Regia	Alba Regia	Mihály Szemes	Hungary
Das Riesenrad	Das Riesenrad	Géza von Radványi	West Germany
Big Request Concert	Das große Wunschkonzert	Arthur Maria Rabenalt	Austria
—N/a	Det store varpet	Nils R. Müller	Norway
Warriors for Freedom	Pedjuang	Usmar Ismail	Indonesia
William Tell	Wilhelm Tell	Michel Dikoff	Switzerland
Sunrise at Campobello	—N/a	Vincent J. Donehue	United States
The Children of Bullerbyn Village	Alla vi barn i Bullerbyn	Olle Hellbom	Sweden
Everybody Go Home	Tutti a casa	Luigi Comencini	Italy, France
The Naked Island	Hadaka no shima	Kaneto Shindo	Japan
Thirst	Setea	Mircea Drăgan	Romania
Enclosure	L'Enclos	Armand Gatti	France, Yugoslavia
We Were Young	A byahme mladi	Binka Zhelyazkova	Bulgaria
Kukuli	Kukuli	Luis Figueroa, Eulogio Nishiyama, César Villanueva	Peru
Kurulubedda	Kurulubedda	L. S. Ramachandran	Ceylon
Chaudhvin Ka Chand	Chaudhvin Ka Chand	Mohammed Sadiq	India
To My Father in Ulan Bator	Ulaan-Baatart baygaa miniy aavd	Dejidiin Jigjid	Mongolia
The Beginning and the End	بداية ونهاية	Salah Abu Seif	Egypt
—N/a	Nebeski odred	Bosko Boskovic, Ilija Nikolic	Yugoslavia
The Fire on the Second Line	Lửa Trung Tuyến	Phạm Văn Khoa	North Vietnam
The Last Winter	Den sidste vinter	Frank Dunlop, Anker Sørensen, Edvin Tiemroth	Denmark, West Germany
The Haunted Castle	Das Spukschloß im Spessart	Kurt Hoffmann	West Germany
Professor Mamlock	Professor Mamlock	Konrad Wolf	East Germany
The Trials of Oscar Wilde	The Trials of Oscar Wilde	Ken Hughes	United Kingdom
Stories of the Revolution	Historias de la revolución	Tomás Gutiérrez Alea	Cuba
Tumangan River	Tumangan River	Chen San In	North Korea
Tonight a City Will Die	Dziś w nocy umrze miasto	Jan Rybkowski	Poland
A Revolutionary Family	Geming jiating	Shui Hua	China
—N/a	Skandaali tyttökoulussa	Edvin Laine	Finland
Juana Gallo	Juana Gallo	Miguel Zacarías	Mexico
Fetters	Pouta	Karel Kachyňa	Czechoslovakia
Clear Skies	Chistoe nebo	Grigori Chukhrai	Soviet Union
This Earth Is Mine	Esta tierra es mía	Hugo del Carril	Argentina

== Awards ==
- Grand Prix:
  - The Naked Island by Kaneto Shindo
  - Clear Skies by Grigori Chukhrai
- Special Golden Prize: Everybody Go Home by Luigi Comencini
- Golden Prizes:
  - Professor Mamlock by Konrad Wolf
  - We Were Young by Binka Zhelyazkova
- Silver Prizes:
  - Alba Regia by Mihály Szemes
  - Thirst by Mircea Drăgan
  - The Haunted Castle by Kurt Hoffmann
  - Director: Armand Gatti for Enclosure
  - Actor: Peter Finch for The Trials of Oscar Wilde
  - Actor: Bambang Hermanto for Warriors for Freedom
  - Actress: Yu Lan for A Revolutionary Family
  - Director of photography: Boguslaw Lambach for Tonight a City Will Die
  - Decorator Bill Constable and costume designer Terence Morgan for The Trials of Oscar Wilde
