= He Lin (engineer) =

Chinese engineer and academic

- 何琳
- Born: 11 November 1957 (age 68); Xi'an, Shaanxi, China
- Education: Xi'an University of Science and Technology; Naval University of Engineering
- Scientific career
- Fields: Submarine noise reduction technology
- Workplaces: Naval University of Engineering

He Lin (Chinese: 何琳; pinyin: Hé Lín; born 11 November 1957) is a Chinese engineer, a major general (shaojiang) of the People's Liberation Army (PLA), and an academician of the Chinese Academy of Engineering.

== Biography ==
He was born in Xi'an, Shaanxi, on 11 November 1957, while his ancestral home in Xichong County, Sichuan. He attended Xi'an University of Science and Technology, graduating in 1981 with a bachelor's degree in engineering mechanics. He went on to receive his master's degree in marine engineering in 1984 at the Naval University of Engineering.

After university, he stayed at the university and worked successively as an assistant, lecturer, associate professor, professor, and doctoral supervisor. He joined the Communist Party in May 1987. In December 1997, he was promoted to dean of its Naval Ship Vibration and Noise Research Institute.

== Honours and awards ==
- 2009 State Science and Technology Progress Award (Second Class)
- 2012 State Science and Technology Progress Award (Second Class)
- 2013 Science and Technology Progress Award of the Ho Leung Ho Lee Foundation
- November 27, 2017 Member of the Chinese Academy of Engineering (CAE)
