= Fang Shu =

Chinese actress

- Born: 8 September 1957 (age 68); Tianjin, China
- Occupation: Actress
- Years active: 1964 – present
- Awards: Hundred Flowers Awards – Best Actress; 1986 Sunrise

Chinese name
- Traditional Chinese: 方舒
- Simplified Chinese: 方舒
Transcriptions

Fang Shu is a mainland Chinese film actress. For her performance in Sunrise, Fang won the Hundred Flowers Award for Best Actress, which adapted from Cao Yu's second play. Her most remembered role is "Xiao Luobotou" – a fictionalized version of Song Zhenzhong – in Eternity in Flames (1964). She remained associated with the role into the 1990s.

== Filmography ==
- Eternity in Flames (1964)
- What A Family (1977)
- Young Friends (1980)
- Sunrise (1985)
- Two Queens (1985)
