= Zhu Guohua =

Chinese criminal and grandson of Zhu De

- 朱国华
- Born: 1957; Yilong, Sichuan
- Died: September 24, 1983 (aged 25–26); Tianjin, China
- Cause of death: Execution by shooting
- Relatives: Zhu De (grandfather); Zhu Qi (father)
- Criminal charges: 86 charges: raping 15 women attempted rape ×7 torture and rape ×21 molestation ×26 entrapment ×17
- Penalty: Death

Details
- Country: China

Zhu Guohua (Chinese: 朱国华; pinyin: Zhū Guóhuá; 1957 – September 24, 1983), grandson of Zhu De, was a Chinese criminal who was executed in Tianjin in 1983 for rape. Zhu's execution was part of Deng Xiaoping's nationwide Strike Hard Against Crime Campaign that saw the arrest of criminals and corrupt descendants (or 'princelings') of politicians. Deng Xiaoping's anti-crime campaign coincided with the reform and opening up.

== Background ==
Zhu Guohua was born in Yilong, Sichuan, to Zhu Qi (朱琦), son of Zhu De.

In 1982, at the age of 25, Zhu Guohua was arrested on 86 charges, including raping 15 women, 7 counts of attempted rape, 21 counts of torture and rape, 26 counts of molestation, 17 counts of entrapment. Zhu was also charged with hooliganism. On September 18, 1983, Zhu Guohua and six others were sentenced to death, and on September 24, 1983, Zhu was shot and executed. Zhu was executed on the same day as more than 80 other criminals.

Zhu's crimes were published in February 1984 in the Hong Kong magazine Cheng Ming. The magazine said there was evidence that Zhu raped 30 women, with other sources saying he raped 50. Zhu also had "naked dancing parties" where he invited, seduced, and attacked women.

== Reactions ==
Zhu Guohua's execution contributed to the downfall of Hu Yaobang as Hu refused to punish and execute Zhu despite other party elders urging him to do so. Another one of Zhu De's grandsons Zhu Yuanchao (朱援朝) was charged with economic crimes.

Zhu's execution was part of Deng Xiaoping's larger campaign to crackdown on the crimes of descendants of cadres, who think they are above the law and have special privilege because they descend from high-ranking government officials. Such children of cadres have abused and taken advantage of their position to get jobs, college admission, residence permits, and foreign travel tickets.

Other examples of princelings who committed crimes include Li Xiannian's grandnephew (grandson of Li Xianjue, brother of Li Xiannian), who was executed for murdering and raping women during Deng Xiaoping's campaign, and Yu Qiangsheng (son of Yu Qiwei), a traitor who defected to the USA.

To discourage the arrogance of princelings and children of officials such as Zhu Guohua, the People's Daily published a 1949 article by Chen Yun where he advised Lu Kaiti to never violate the law and never have a "haughty" attitude with the people.

== See also ==
- Strike Hard Against Crime Campaign
- List of serial rapists
- Princelings
