= People's Park (Xining) =

Urban public park in Xining, Qinghai, China

- Renmin Park
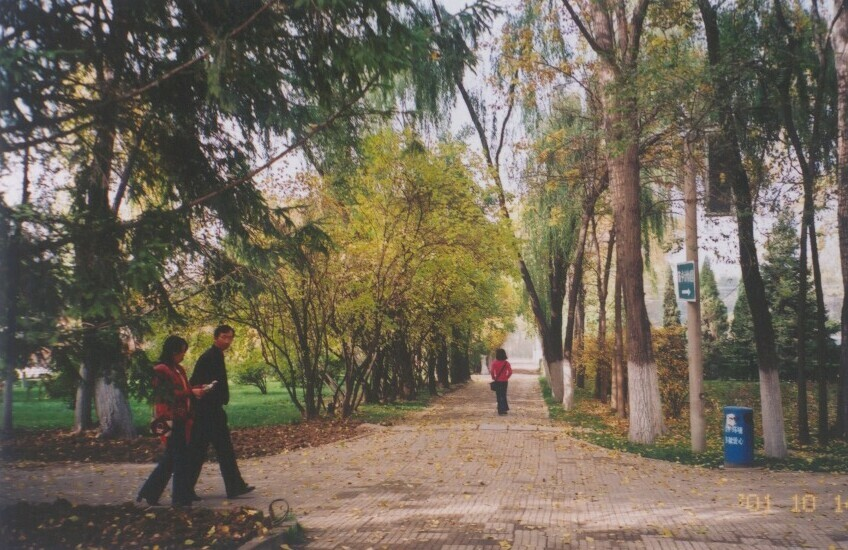
- People's Park in 2001
- Interactive map of People's Park
- Type: Urban park
- Location: Xining, Qinghai, China
- Coordinates: 36°38′15″N 101°45′40″E
- Area: 40 ha (99 acres)
- Created: 1959
- Designer: Yao Jingquan

People's Park (Chinese: 人民公园; pinyin: Rénmín Gōngyuán) is an urban public park in central Xining, capital of Qinghai province in western China. Covering an area of 40 hectares (99 acres), it is the largest park in downtown Xining. The park was established in 1959 and expanded in 1964.

== Overview ==
People's Park is located on the south bank of the Huangshui River, at the confluence of Huangshui and Beichuan rivers. Its centerpiece is an artificial lake which is lined with willow trees and crossed with two arch bridges in the style of the Jiangnan region. It is divided by a walkway into West Lake and East Lake. The west bank of the lake is lined with a 200-metre (660 ft) arcade. North of the lake is the Lakeview Tower (望湖楼), which affords panoramic views of the lake to the south and the Huangshui to the north.

== History ==
The park was first opened in 1959, with not much more than a simple zoo. In 1961, Yao Jingquan (姚景权), a new graduate of Beijing Forestry University, was assigned to work for the urban construction bureau of Xining Municipal Government. As the only person in the bureau who had studied park and garden design, he was tasked with redesigning the park. The centerpiece of Yao's design was an artificial lake, which would be used for skating in winter and boating for the rest of the year. Water for the lake would be sourced from the nearby Huangshui River. The city government adopted his proposal and mobilized a large number of citizen volunteers to dig the lake, which took three months to complete. The excavated earth was used to create an island in the middle of the lake. Yao's original design called for a six-story pagoda to be erected on the island, but due to weight concerns it was changed to a pavilion. Construction began in 1964, and the park was reopened in 1965.
