= Army Service Academy =

University in China

Coordinates: 29.6317°N 106.3144°E

The Army Service Academy (中国人民解放军陆军勤务学院; formerly known as the Logistical Engineering University of PLA or University of Logistics) is a military-affiliated college in Chongqing. It is affiliated to the General Logistics Department of the People's Liberation Army.

It was founded in 1961.

== Facilities ==
University of Logistics, established in 1961, is at Majiabao and Xietaizi in the city of Chongqing. It covers over 1300 acres, with building area over 400 thousand square meters.

There are over 650,000 books in the library, and it has area network and E-reading rooms. It has a member of the Chinese Academy of Engineering.

It has 248 professors and associate professors, 13 PHD supervisors, and 91 postgraduate supervisors, 49 of which are benefited from the government's special allowance.

== Disciplines and courses ==
- Architecture
- Structural Engineering
- Underground Engineering
- Plumbing and Heating and Ventilation Engineering
- Power System and Automation
- Oil Storage and Transportation Automation
- Command Automation Engineering
- Oil Storage and Transportation Engineering
- Oil Chemistry
- Warehouse Automation
- Barracks Management
- Military Warehouse Management
- Barracks Device Management
- Oil Machinery and Equipment and Automation
- Fuel Management
- Fuel Quality Measurement Management
- Environmental Engineering

=== Post-doctoral research center ===
- Chemical Engineering and Technology

=== Doctorate authorization ===
- Geotechnical Engineering
- Applied Chemistry
- Petroleum and Natural Gas Storage and Transportation

=== Master's authorization ===
==== State-level key discipline ====
- Petroleum and Natural Gas Storage and Transportation

==== Provincial and municipal key discipline ====
- Petroleum and Natural Gas Storage and Transportation
- Applied Chemistry
- Logistics
- Management Science and Engineering

==== Military key laboratory ====
- Military underground construction lab

==== Provincial key laboratory ====
- Experimental Center of Petroleum and Natural Gas Storage and Transportation
- Oil testing and assessment center
