= Armand Gatti =

French writer and filmmaker (1924–2017)

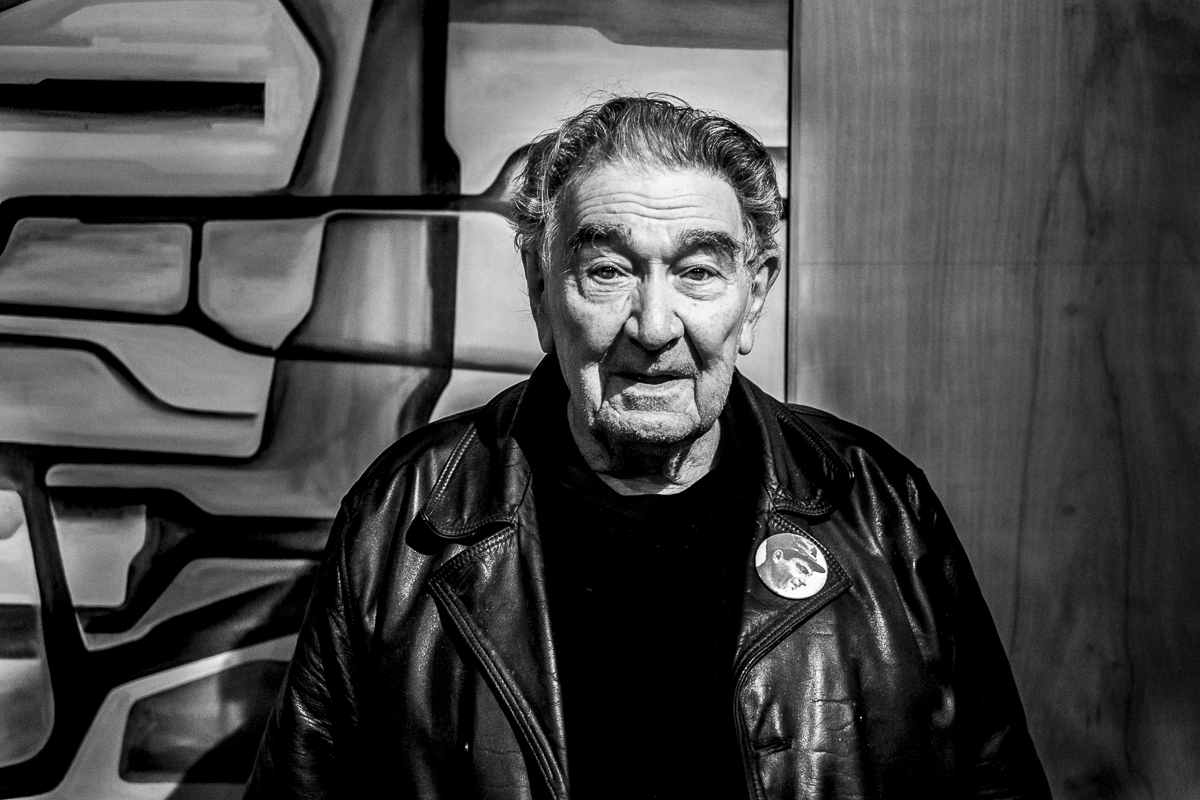
- Born: 26 January 1924; Monte Carlo, Monaco
- Died: 6 April 2017 (aged 93); Saint-Mandé, France
- Occupations: Playwright; poet; journalist; screenwriter; filmmaker
- Years active: 1960–2012

Armand Gatti (French: [aʁmɑ̃ ɡati]; 26 January 1924 – 6 April 2017) was a French playwright, poet, journalist, screenwriter, filmmaker and World War II resistance fighter. His debut film Enclosure was entered into the 2nd Moscow International Film Festival where he won the Silver Prize for Best Director. Two years later, his film El Otro Cristóbal was entered into the 1963 Cannes Film Festival.

== Personal life ==
According to his 1989 biographer, Dorothy Knowles, Gatti was born in 1924 in a shantytown in Monaco to Auguste Rainier an Italian anarchist from Piedmont, who escaped murder in a Chicago slaughterhouse because of his political activities and fled Benito Mussolini's regime and to Letizia Lusona a maid.

He died on 6 April 2017.

Gatti, like his father, was an anarchist. His works included themes of prisons and escape.

== Theatrical works ==
- 1957 Le Poisson noir (awarded Fénéon Prize)
- 1962 La vie imaginaire de l'éboueur Auguste G
- 1966 Chant public devant deux chaises électriques
- 1975 Die Hälfte des Himmels und wir (La Moitié du ciel et nous) - Forum Theater Berlin

== Filmography ==
- 1960 Moranbong, une aventure coréenne (writer only)
- 1961 Enclosure
- 1963 El Otro Cristóbal
- 1968 Das imaginäre Leben des Straßenkehrers Auguste G. (writer only)
- 1970 Der Übergang über den Ebro
- 1983 Nous étions tous des noms d'arbres

== Honours and awards ==
- Chevalier of the Order of Legion of Honour (1999)
- Commandeur of the Ordre des Arts et des Lettres (2004)

== Sources ==
- Banham, Martin, ed. 1998. The Cambridge Guide to Theatre. Cambridge: Cambridge UP. ISBN 0-521-43437-8.
