= A Revolutionary Family =

1961 film

- Film poster
- Directed by: Shui Hua
- Written by: Shui Hua; Xia Yan
- Starring: Yu Lan; Shi Xiaoman; Sun Daolin; Zhang Lian
- Cinematography: Jiang Qian
- Edited by: Yan Shanghua
- Music by: Wei Qu
- Production company: Beijing Film Studio
- Release dates: 11 July 1961 (China); 26 February 1962 (USSR)
- Running time: 94 minutes
- Country: China
- Language: Mandarin

A Revolutionary Family (Chinese: 革命家庭, translit. Geming jiating) is a 1961 Chinese drama film directed by Shui Hua. It was entered into the 2nd Moscow International Film Festival.

== Cast ==
- Yu Lan as Zhou Lian
- Shi Xiaoman
- Sun Daolin
- Zhang Lian

== Awards and nominations ==
1st Hundred Flowers Awards

- Won: Best Screenplay (Shui Hua, Xia Yan)

2nd Moscow International Film Festival

- Won: Best Actress (Yu Lan)
- Nominated: Grand Prix (Shui Hua)
