= Li Xi (politician, born 1962) =

Chinese politician (born 1962)

- 李喜

Executive Vice Mayor of Kunming
- In office July 2008 – June 2014
- Mayor: Li Wenrong (李文荣)

Communist Party Secretary of Anning
- In office April 2006 – July 2008

Personal details
- Born: December 1962 (age 63) Kunming, Yunnan, China
- Party: Chinese Communist Party (1984-2015; expelled)

Li Xi (Chinese: 李喜; pinyin: Lǐ Xǐ; born December 1962) is a former Chinese politician from Yunnan province; he served as the executive vice mayor of Kunming and a member of the provincial capital's Provincial party standing committee.

== Early life ==
Li was born and raised in Kunming, capital of Yunnan.

== Career ==
He entered the workforce in July 1981 and joined the Chinese Communist Party in October 1984.

During his early years, he served in several posts in Guandu District, including director of government office, deputy party chief and magistrate of Guanshang Town.

Then he was promoted to become deputy party chief and mayor of Anning, he was appointed party chief of Anning in April 2006, he remained in that position until July 2008, when he was transferred to Kunming and appointed the executive vice-mayor, he was re-elected in June 2014.

== Downfall ==
On October 21, 2014, the state media reported that he was being investigated by the Central Commission for Discipline Inspection for "serious violations of laws and regulations".

On the afternoon of December 8, 2015, the Intermediate People's Court of Qujing in Yunnan province opened a trial session to hear the bribery case of Li Xi. Li Xi was accused of taking advantage of his position to seek benefits for others and illegally accepting other people's property for more than 18.27 million yuan ($2.88 million), 0.132 million U.S. dollar, 30,000 Euro, diamonds (diamonds worth 330 thousand yuan) and bullions (bullions worth 0.2766 million yuan).
