= Shui Hua =

Chinese film director

- Born: Zhang Yufan; November 23, 1916; Nanjing, China
- Died: December 16, 1995 (aged 79)
- Occupations: Film director, Screenwriter
- Years active: 1950s-1960s; 1980s
- Political party: Chinese Communist Party

Chinese name
- Traditional Chinese: 水華
- Simplified Chinese: 水华
Transcriptions
Standard Mandarin
- Hanyu Pinyin: Shǔi Huà

Shui Hua (simplified Chinese: 水华; traditional Chinese: 水華) (November 23, 1916 – December 16, 1995), born Zhang Yufan, was a Chinese film director who gained prominence in the 1950s in the early years of the People's Republic of China.

== Career ==
Born in Nanjing in 1916, Shui Hua studied to be an attorney at Fudan University in Shanghai. During the Second Sino-Japanese War, Shui made his way to the Yan'an where he became a member of the Chinese Communist Party. After the war, Shui became involved in theater while teaching eventually moving into filmmaking with his 1950 debut film, The White Haired Girl. Later in the decade, he directed the critically acclaimed The Lin Family Shop, based on a short story by the author Mao Dun.

With the turmoil of the 1960s and 1970s, Shui's filmmaking days seemed behind him. However, upon China's re-emergence from the Cultural Revolution, Shui again began to direct films, including Regret for the Past (1981), based on a story by Lu Xun, and Blue Flowers (1984).

== Filmography ==
Year	English Title	Chinese Title	Notes
1950	The White Haired Girl	白毛女	Co-directed with Wang Bin
1959	The Lin Family Shop	林家铺子	Based on the short story by Mao Dun
1960	A Revolutionary Family	革命家庭	Best Screenplay at the Hundred Flowers Awards; Entered into the 2nd Moscow International Film Festival.
1965	Eternity in Flames	烈火中永生	
1981	Regret for the Past	伤逝	Based on the short story by Lu Xun
1984	Blue Flowers	蓝色的花	
