= Huang Yan (politician) =

Chinese politician

Huang Yan (Chinese: 黄岩) (August 16, 1912 – June 9, 1989) was a Chinese politician. He was born in Liu'an County, Anhui Province (modern Yu'an District, Lu'an, Anhui Province). He was the second governor of his home province under the People's Republic of China.

Preceded by Zeng Xisheng	Governor of Anhui	Succeeded by Li Desheng
