= Mayfair Yang =

Taiwanese-American anthropologist

Mayfair Yang or Yang Meihui (Chinese: 楊美惠) is a Taiwanese-American cultural anthropologist of China. Her research focuses on modernity, religion and secularism, state formation, religious environmentalism, China Studies, gender studies, postcolonial studies, and media studies.

== Early life and education ==
Yang was born in Taipei, Taiwan. She received all three of her degrees from the University of California, Berkeley, receiving a B.A. in 1979 with a double major in anthropology and Chinese, a M.A. in 1981, and a Ph.D. in 1986, both in anthropology.

== Academic career ==
Yang started out as an assistant professor in the Department of Anthropology at University of California, Santa Barbara, then in 2004, became professor in two departments: Religious Studies and East Asian Languages & Cultural Studies. She was director and professor of Asian Studies at the University of Sydney in Australia in 2007–2009. Yang has also received research fellowships from the University of Michigan, University of Chicago, Peking University, Academia Sinica in Taiwan, Institute for Advanced Study in Princeton, Center for the Study of World Religions at Harvard University, Fudan University in Shanghai, Asia Research Institute of the National University of Singapore, and the Max Planck Institute for the Study of Religious and Ethnic Diversity in Göettingen, Germany. She has been invited to give lectures in Europe, Asia, Australia, and the U.S. She is the founding director of the UCSB Confucius Institute and has supervised the program since 2015.

== Publications ==
She is the author of the book Gifts, Favors, and Banquets: the Art of Social Relationships in China (1994). It won the American Ethnological Society Book Prize in 1997, and received Honorable Mentions for the Leeds Prize in Urban Anthropology and the Victor Turner Prize in Ethnographic Writing. This book was the first systematic examination of the cultural and economic phenomenon of guanxi (social connections and obligations) in contemporary Chinese society. It has been translated into Chinese by publishers in both China and Taiwan. The book inspired Alena Ledeneva, a professor of University College London to invoke this book in her study of blat, a similar practice in Soviet and post-Soviet Russia.

She also edited Chinese Religiosities: Afflictions of Modernity and State Formation (2008) and Spaces of Their Own: Women's Public Sphere in Transnational China (1999).

Yang made two video documentaries about contemporary China. The first one is titled “Public & Private Realms in Rural Wenzhou, China” (1994). The second film, “Through Chinese Women's Eyes” (1997) is distributed by Women Make Movies in New York City. The film was selected for exhibition at the Creteil Women's Film Festival in France in 1999.

In 2020, Yang published Re-enchanting Modernity: Ritual Economy and Society in Wenzhou, China based on ethnography conducted between 1990 and 2016 in the Chinese city of Wenzhou. The book examines the resurgence of religious and ritual life after decades of enforced secularization in the coastal area of Wenzhou.
