= Just Journalism =

Former UK-based research organization

Just Journalism was a UK-based research organisation and pressure group, which commented on Israel and the Middle East. Its stated goals were to focus "on how Israel and Middle East issues are reported in the UK media." The organisation published online analyses in response to news stories, reported on "long-term trends", and opinion pieces for external publications.

It was established in the spring of 2008 with Michael Weiss as executive director. Just Journalism was closely associated with the Henry Jackson Society (HJS), sharing an office with it.

When Just Journalism was closed, in September 2011, citing "lack of funds" as the reason, Robin Shepherd, international affairs director of the Henry Jackson Society and a member of Just Journalism's advisory board, said: "This is a great pity and the cause of Israel in Britain will be the poorer for it."

== Output ==
Just Journalism analysed the British media's coverage of the Israeli–Palestinian conflict, as well as related Middle East topics, such as the Iranian nuclear programme, the status of human rights in Arab states, and the conditions of Palestinian refugees outside of the West Bank and Gaza.

The organisation also engaged in "events and activities" about "journalistic accountability", such as the December 2010 conference, titled "Squaring the Circle? Britain and the De-legitimisation of Israel" and organised jointly with the Henry Jackson Society, which took place in London. The event, co-sponsored by Bank Hapoalim and The Jewish Chronicle, featured as panelists academic, lawyer and bioethicist Ruth Deech; Observer columnist Nick Cohen; Israeli Ambassador to the United Kingdom Ron Prosor; Times senior journalist Daniel Finkelstein; and Friends of Israel Initiative Executive Director Rafael Bardají. It was chaired by Jewish Chronicle editor Stephen Pollard.

== Media coverage ==
Just Journalism's work has been mentioned in British, American and Israeli publications such as The Jewish Chronicle, The New Republic and The Jerusalem Post. It has also had opinion pieces published in Haaretz, the Weekly Standard, Standpoint, and The Guardian 's Comment is free website.

== Reception ==
Prize-winning British journalist Melanie Phillips called Just Journalism "a very welcome and desperately-needed initiative", and stated: "This is the first organisation in Britain set up to monitor and analyse media coverage of the Middle East on a systematic, forensic and objective basis. Its notable characteristic is the transparency of its methodology, so that everyone can judge both the material under scrutiny and the way JJ is conducting that scrutiny."

Sharif Nashashibi, founder of Arab Media Watch, has criticized the organisation in The Guardian, following an analysis of British media coverage of the 2009 Israeli election by Just Journalism's chief executive Elizabeth Jay. Nashashibi said that Jay had failed to meet the organisation's declared aims of promoting accurate reporting by "cherry picking quotes" and highlighting "only those alleged omissions and misrepresentations that negatively impact on Israel".

In 2008, Just Journalism's Director Adel Darwish and board member Nick Cohen resigned from their positions, citing disagreements with the organisation's chair and founder, on the issue of neutrality. Just Journalism's media analyst, Chris Lawes, an Oxford University graduate, is now Campaigns Officer for the Zionist Federation in London.

== Principals ==
=== Advisory board ===
Among the members of the group's Advisory Board, according to its website, have been:

- Rt Hon Dr Denis MacShane, MP for Rotherham, former Minister for Europe and advocate for democratic trade unions.
- Hussein Ibish, senior research fellow at the American Task Force on Palestine (ATFP) and executive director of the Hala Salaam Maksoud Foundation for Arab-American Leadership.
- Robin Shepherd, Director of International Affairs at the Henry Jackson Society and a former senior research fellow at Chatham House.
- Michael Ullman, fellow of St Catherine's College, Oxford, and entrepreneur.
- Alan Johnson, professor of Democratic Theory and Practice at Edge Hill University.
- Douglas Murray, author, political commentator and Director of the Centre for Social Cohesion.
- Dr. Alan Mendoza, Co-Founder and executive director of The Henry Jackson Society.
- Daniel Johnson, journalist and editor of Standpoint magazine.
- Michael Rainsborough, professor of Strategic Theory in the Department of War Studies, King's College London.
- Nina Rosenwald, co-chair of the Board of the American Securities Management Group and editor-in-chief of Hudson New York.
- Ghanem Nuseibeh, founder of Cornerstone Global Associates and section head at the Political Capital Policy Research and Consulting Institute.

=== Staff ===
- Michael Weiss, executive director
- Carmel Gould, content manager
- Chris Dyszynski, media analyst
- Jon Dranko, events intern
- Rael Miller, media intern

== See also ==
- Media bias
- Media coverage of the Arab–Israeli conflict
- HonestReporting
- CAMERA
- MEMRI
