= UCL School of Slavonic and East European Studies =

London university department

Coordinates: 51.5254°N 0.1316°W

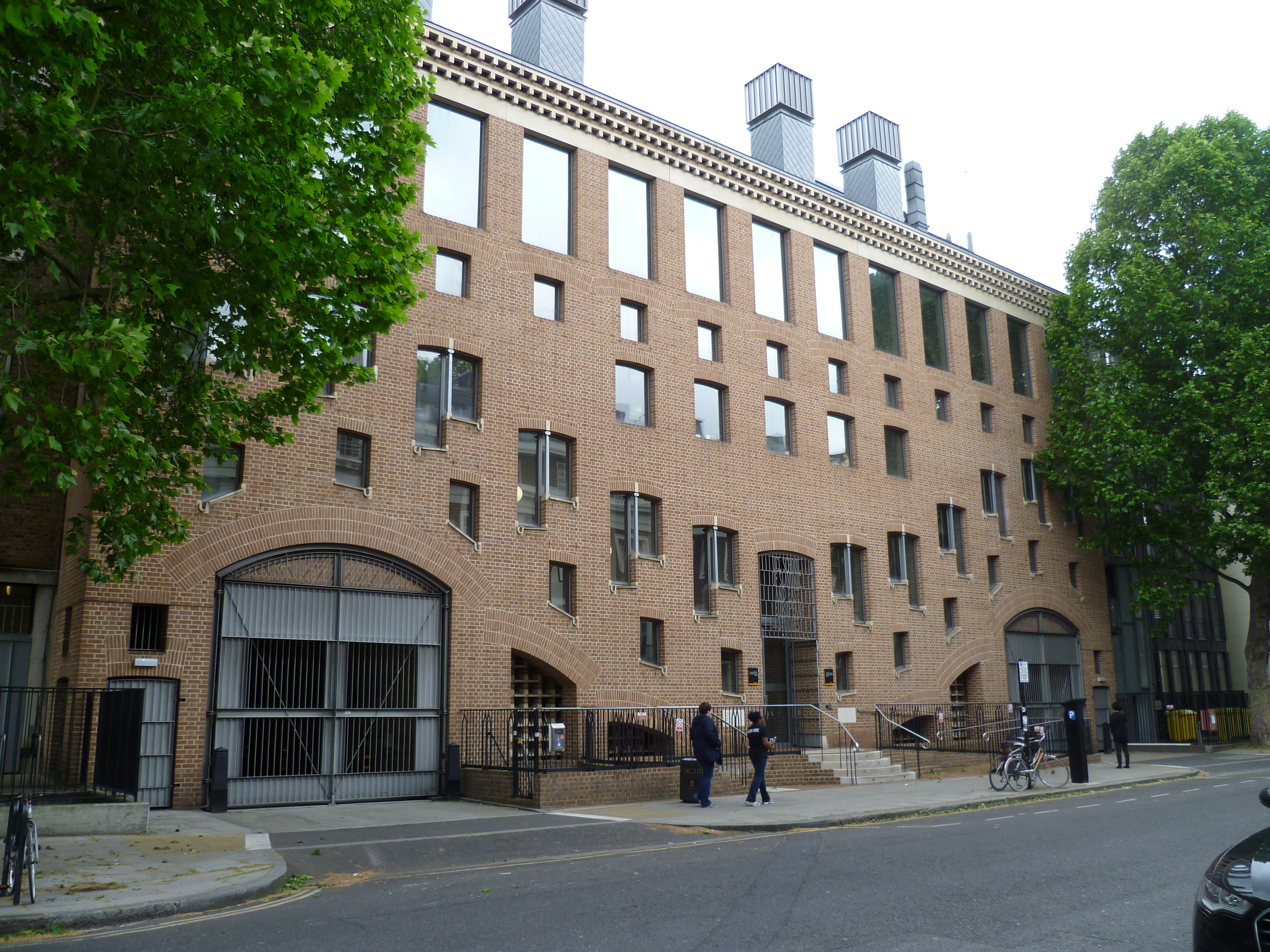
- Established: 1915
- Founder: R. W. Seton-Watson
- Parent institution: University College London
- Director: Professor Jasna Dragović-Soso
- Academic staff: 101
- Administrative staff: 21
- Students: 900
- Undergraduates: 650
- Postgraduates: 210
- Location: London, England
- Campus: Urban
- Website: www.ucl.ac.uk/ssees

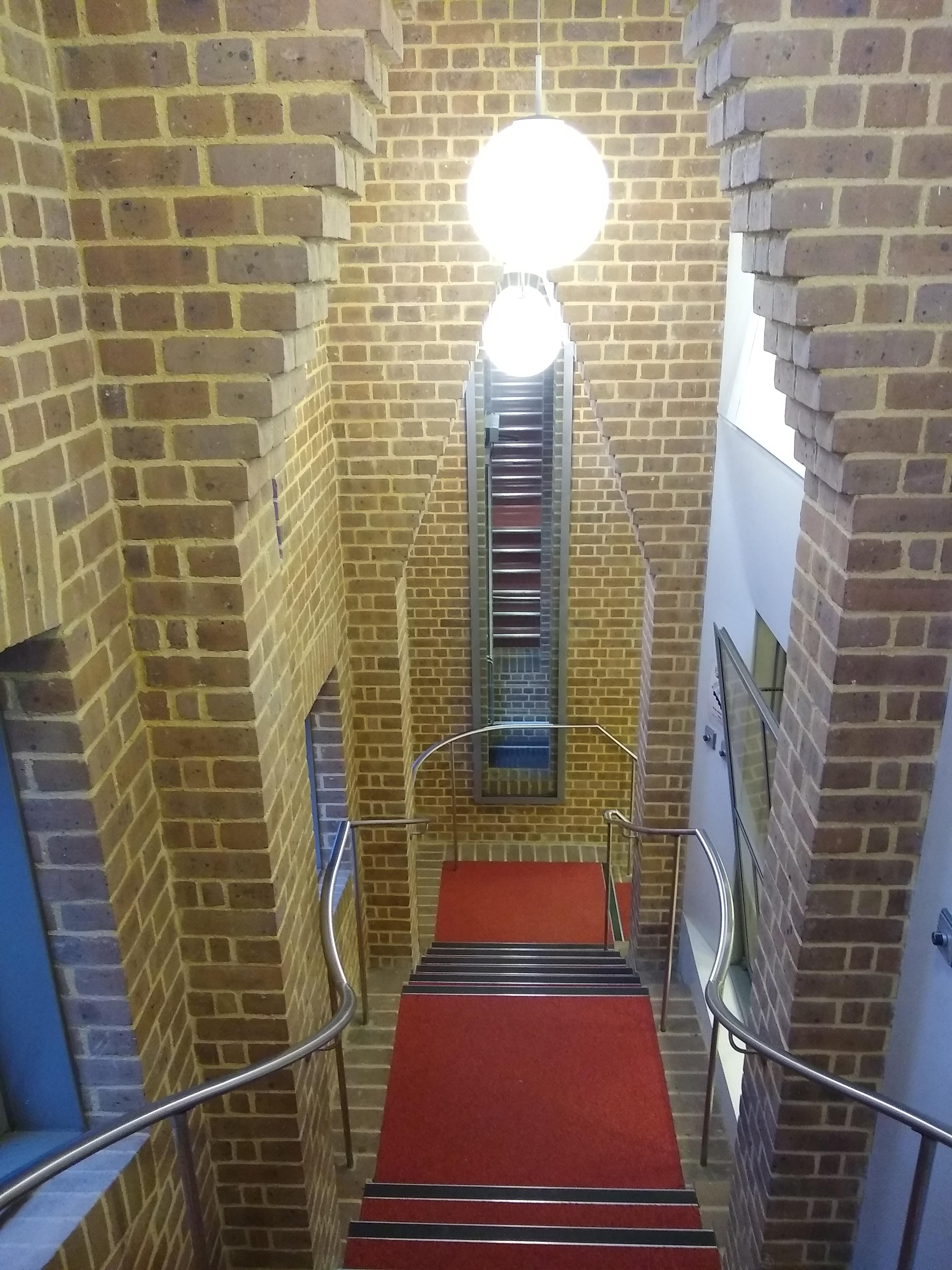
Stairway detail

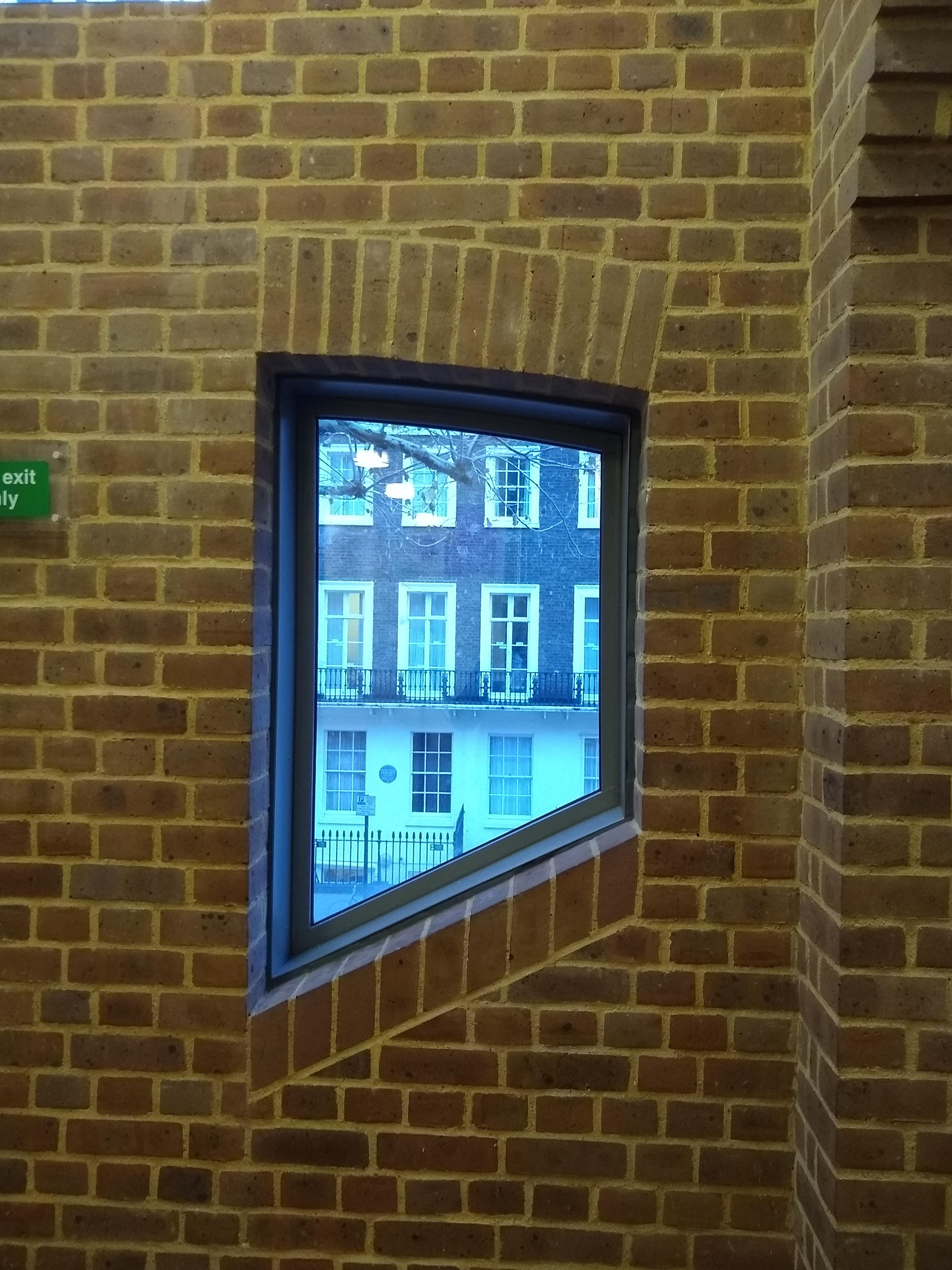
Window detail

The UCL School of Slavonic and East European Studies (SSEES /ˈsiːs/) is a school of University College London (UCL) specializing in Central, Eastern and South-Eastern Europe, Russia and Eurasia. It teaches a range of subjects, including the history, politics, literature, sociology, economics and languages of the region. It is Britain's largest centre for study of Central, Eastern and South-Eastern Europe and Russia. It has links with universities across Europe and beyond. It became part of UCL in 1999.

== History ==
The school was founded by Robert Seton-Watson in 1915, as a department of King's College London, and inaugurated by Tomáš Garrigue Masaryk, later President of Czechoslovakia. In 1932 it became an independent institute of the University of London, but it merged with University College London in 1999. It became part of the Faculty of Arts and Humanities in the 2023/24 academic year.

== Teaching ==
More than 100 staff teach and conduct research in the history, economics, politics, sociology, anthropology, culture, literature and languages of the countries of Central, Eastern and South-Eastern Europe, and Russia. In 2012/2013 the school had over 200 graduate students studying taught MA degrees or undertaking PhD research. The school also has over 600 undergraduate students.

== Research ==
Along with its undergraduate and graduate teaching, the school hosts several interdisciplinary research centres, groups and funded projects aimed at helping to expand research and understanding of its specialist regions.

It analyses and disseminates information about changes in the region, publishing periodicals, papers and books, holding conferences, public lectures, seminars and briefings, and providing experts to act as advisers to governments, the media and institutions.

== Library ==
SSEES's first library was housed in King's College and staffed by a part time honorary librarian. In 1928 after the school moved to premises in Torrington Square books were housed by subject in various lecturers's rooms. The first full time librarian Sergei Yacobson was appointed in 1934 and he compiled the first catalogue of the library's stock. The library along with the school moved to new premises in Senate House in 1938 but during the war the library had to be left behind when SSEES was evacuated to Oxford and many books were damaged during an air raid. In the post war years the library expanded both in space occupied and staff employed.

The library of some 357,000 volumes of books, pamphlets and periodicals is unique in the United Kingdom for the quantity of research material on open access and the extensive collection of regional newspapers. Its collections are consulted by scholars from all over the world. It has recently taken on a major role in providing electronic and audio-visual material on its area of study. The library moved from Senate House to a new building in Taviton Street in 2005.

The main fields of interest are the languages, literature, history, politics, economics, geography and bibliography of the countries it covers. Subsidiary fields are the arts in general, demography, ethnography and religion. Material is also collected on the former German Democratic Republic (history, political and economic life), the history of Germany and Austria, the Lusatian Sorbs, and Slavonic and Ugro-Finnic studies in general. It houses the Bain Graffy Film Collection of films from and about Russia and Central and Eastern Europe.

== Building ==
In May 2004 the foundation stone of the school's new building on Taviton Street, Bloomsbury, was unveiled by the President of Poland, Aleksander Kwaśniewski, in the presence of The Princess Royal, Chancellor of the University of London. The school moved to the building in the summer of 2005 after almost 90 years at Senate House. Václav Klaus, President of the Czech Republic, delivered the keynote address of his visit to the UK at a ceremony to open the building in October 2005. After Klaus's address, the Princess Royal unveiled a stone to mark the formal opening, on the occasion of the school's 90th anniversary.

The building was designed by the architects Short & Associates, which was founded and led by Professor Alan Short, an architect and Professor of Architecture at the University of Cambridge. The firm also designed Contact Theatre at Manchester University, which was the winner of the RIBA Building of the Year Award 1999. It was built of brick

SSEES at UCL opened in October 2005. A brick building with an innovative window design across its front facade, the design aims to be "environmentally friendly" not simply with solar panels, but by facilitating the draught of cool air round the building, to avoid a need for air conditioning or other energy-using solutions – a first for the "central London heat island".

The ground floor echoes the curved shape of the floors above. All floors are visible to some extent through a light well from the staff rooms.

== Notable alumni and staff ==
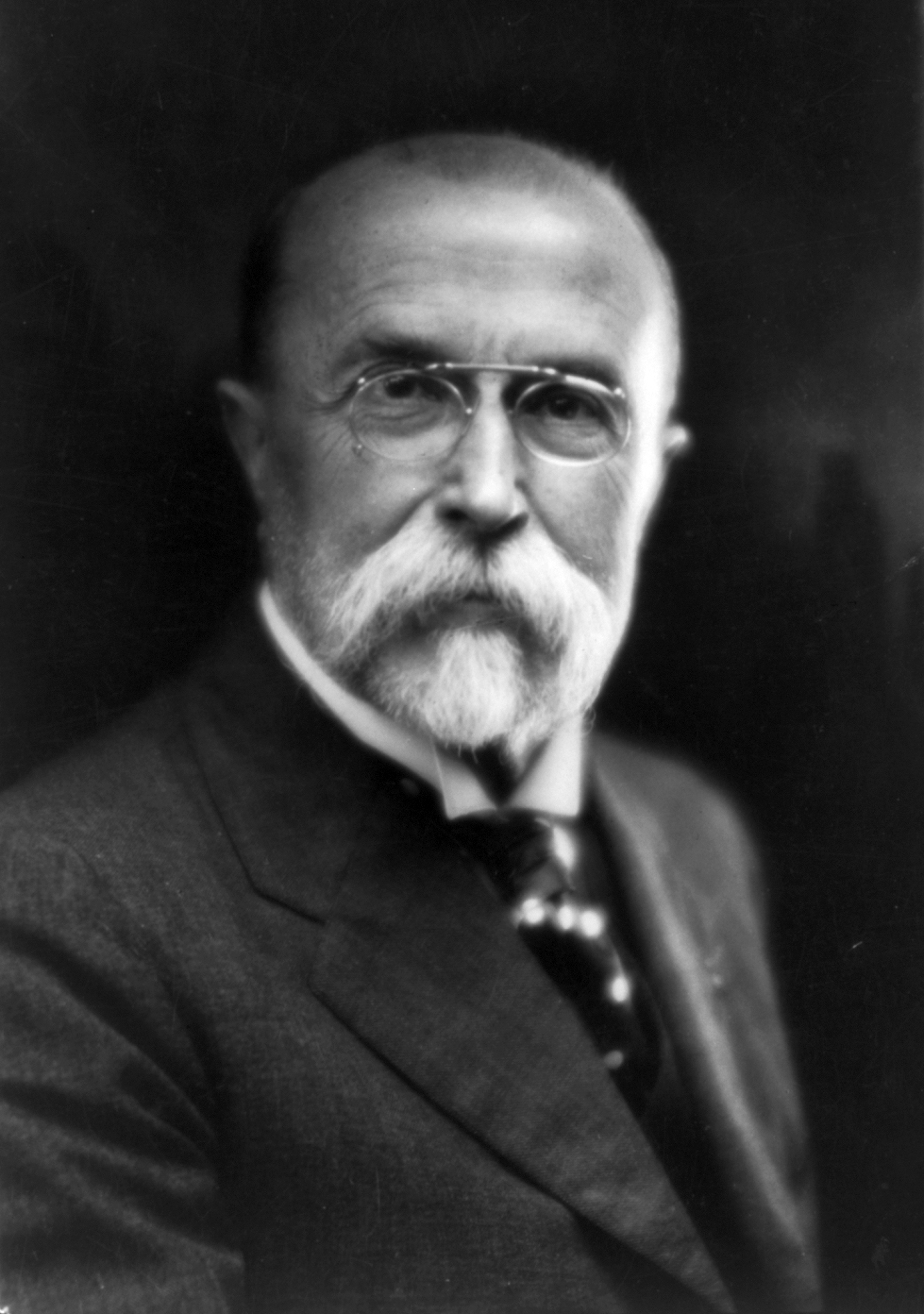
Tomáš Masaryk

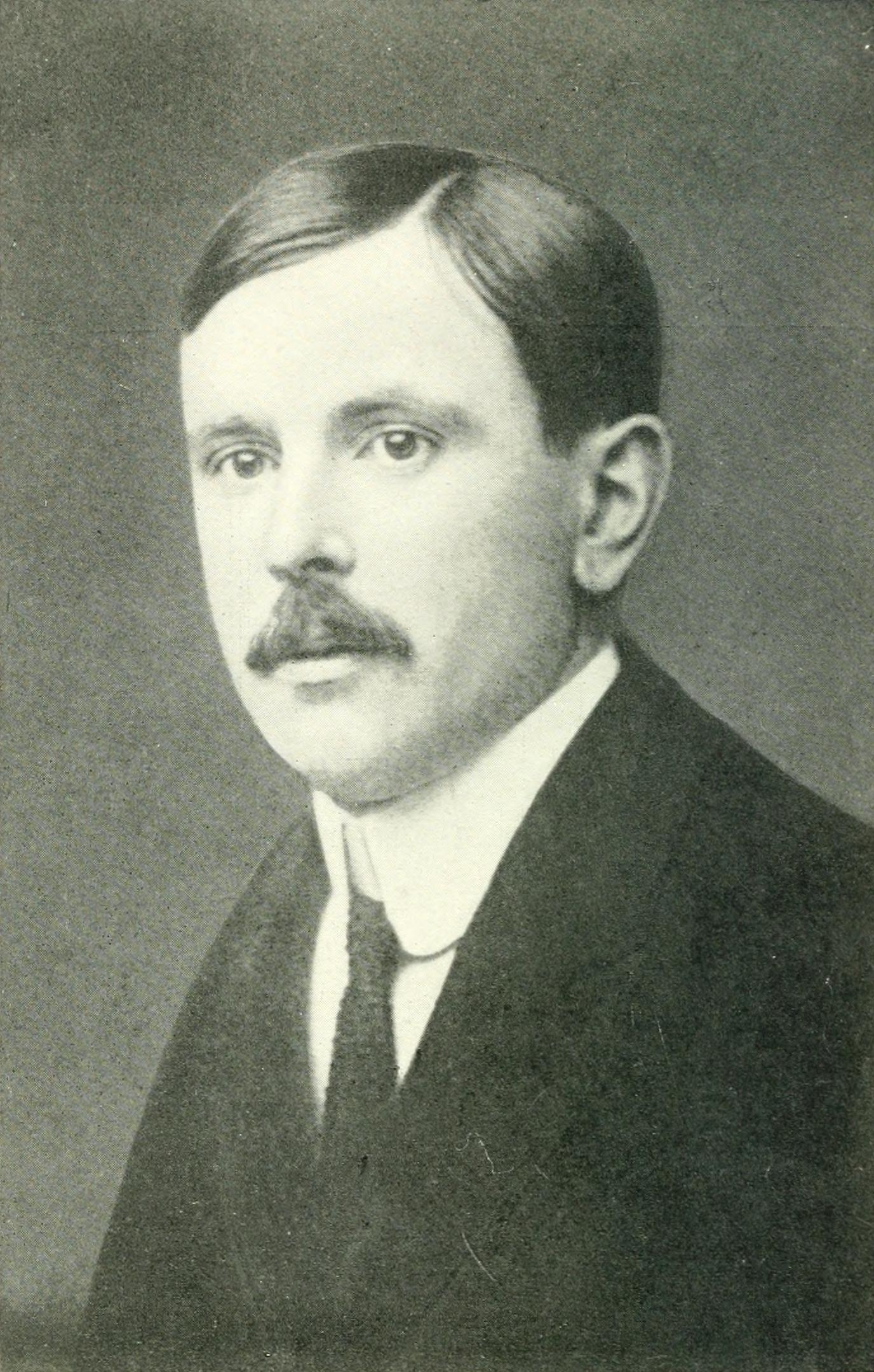
R. W. Seton-Watson

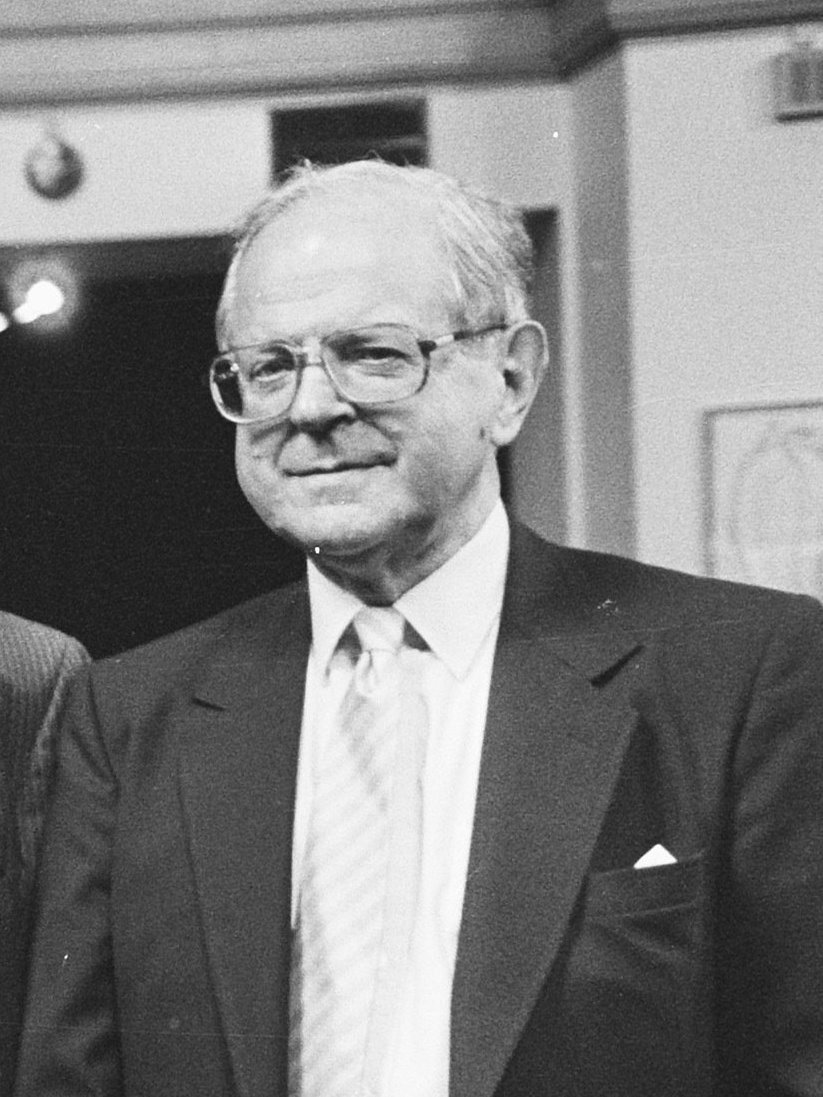
Robert Conquest

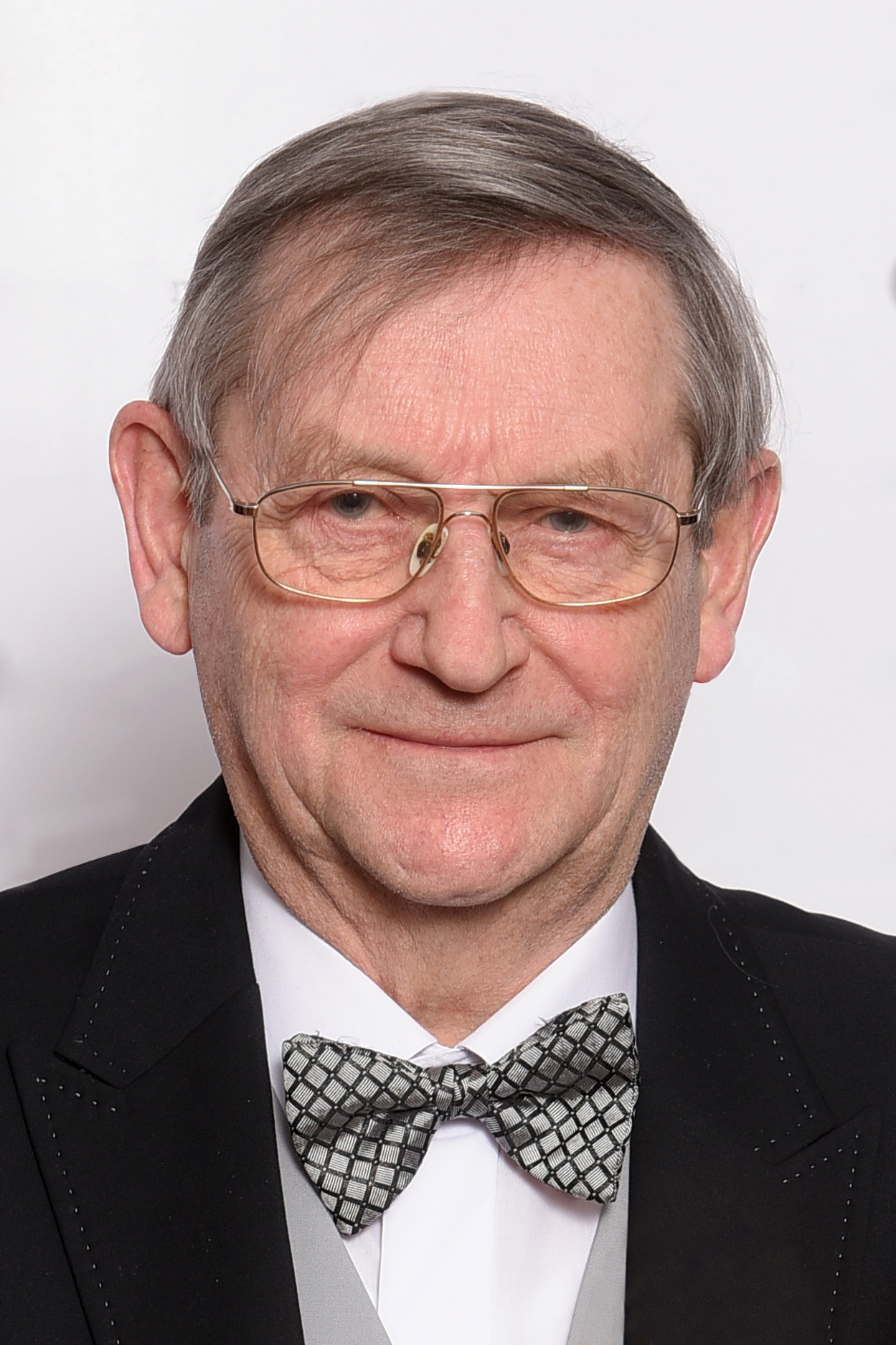
Norman Davies

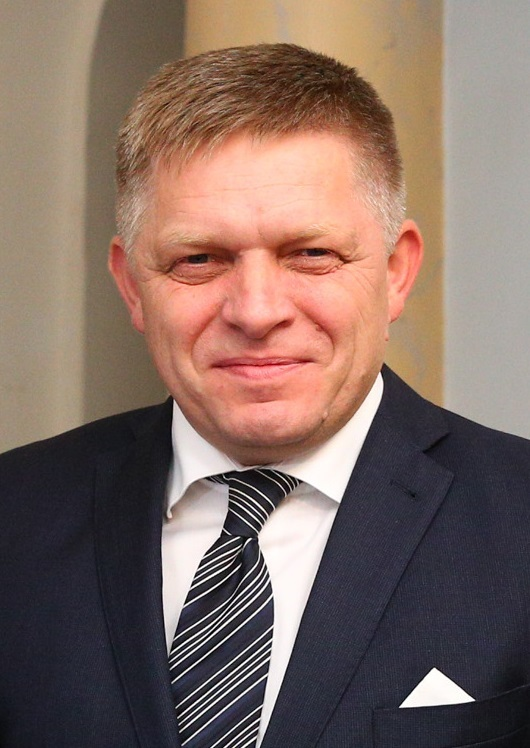
Robert Fico

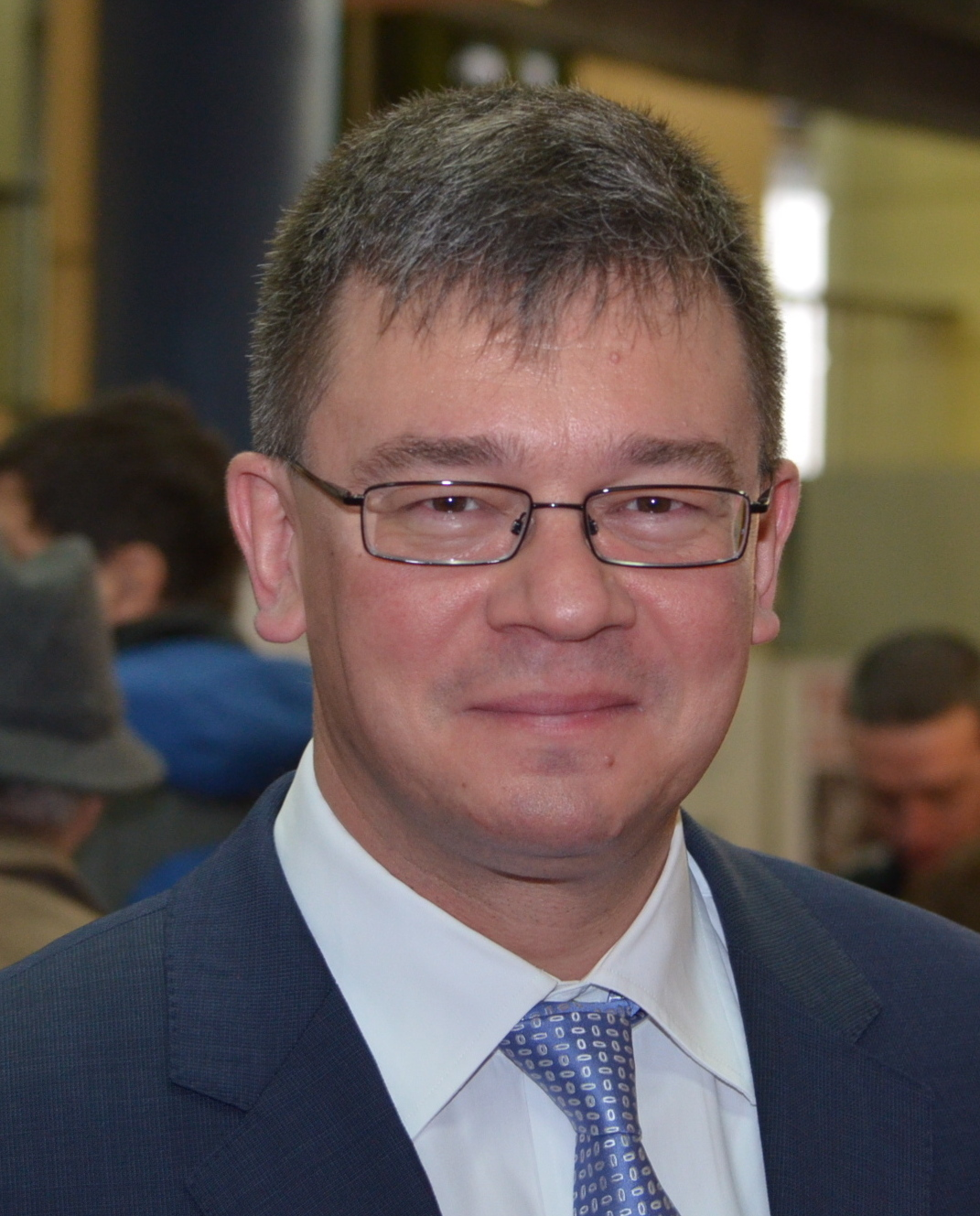
Mihai Răzvan Ungureanu

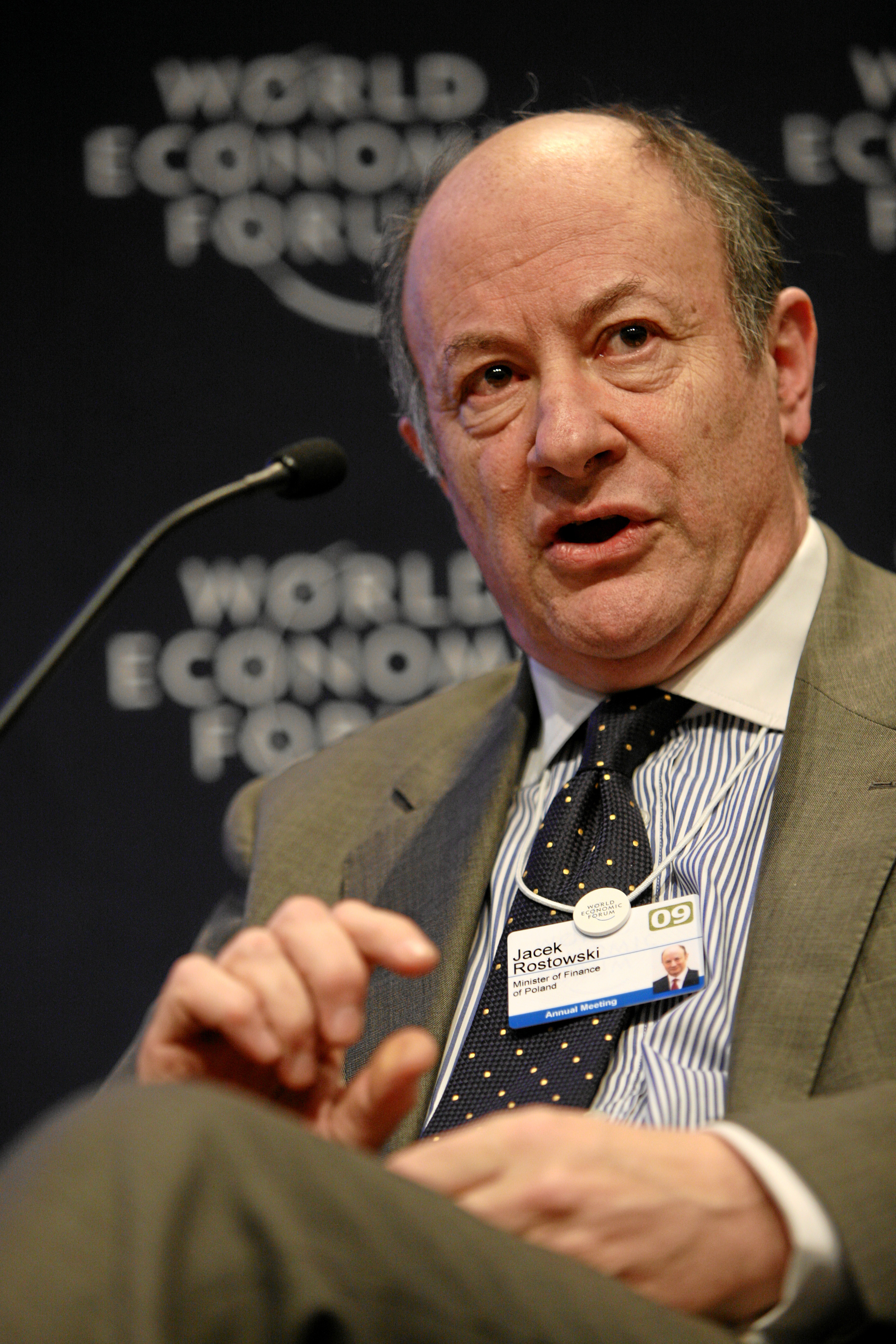
Jacek Rostowski

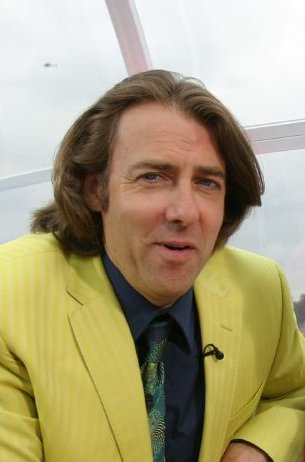
Jonathan Ross
- Acija Alfirević, academic and writer
- Anthony Bailey (BA Eastern and Central European Studies, 1991), interfaith campaigner
- Robin Baker (BA), former Vice-Chancellor of Canterbury Christ Church University
- George Bolsover (Director of SSEES, 1947–1976)
- Michael Branch (BA; PhD, 1967; Director of SSEES, 1980–2001)
- Jamie Bulloch (MA, Central and East European History, 1993; PhD, 2002), literary translator
- Sir Roger Carrick (Bulgarian, 1962), diplomat and former UK High Commissioner to Australia
- Robert Conquest (Bulgarian, 1943), historian and poet
- Norman Davies (lecturer then Professor of History, 1971–1996)
- Robert Fico (Masaryk scholarship), Prime Minister of Slovakia
- Robert I. Frost (PhD History), historian
- Richard Gilbert Hare professor of Russian literature
- Titus Hjelm (lecturer in Finnish Studies), member of the power metal band Thunderstone
- Sir Robert Hodgson (Chair of SSEES Council, 1943–1945), diplomat
- Clare Hollingworth (Croatian), journalist
- Geoffrey Hosking (chair and Leverhulme Research Professor of Russian History, 1984–2007), academic and co-founder of Nightline
- Lindsey Hughes (Reader then Professor of Russian History, 1987–2007)
- Eleanor Janega (PhD History, 2015), medieval historian and broadcaster
- Andres Kasekamp (PhD History, 1996), Director of the Estonian Foreign Policy Institute and Professor of Baltic Politics at the University of Tartu
- David Kirby (former professor of Modern European History), historian of the Baltic states
- Ivo Lapenna (Reader in Soviet Law, c. 1964 onwards), former President of the World Esperanto Association and academic lawyer
- Alena Ledeneva (current Professor of Politics and Society)
- Stephen Lovell (MA, PhD), academic
- Clarence Manning (staff), academic and Slavicist
- Tomáš Garrigue Masaryk (Inaugurated SSEES, Professor of Slavic Research), first President of Czechoslovakia
- Margaret Stevenson Miller (PhD), academic and women's rights campaigner
- Roger Moorhouse (MA History and Politics, 1994), author and historian
- Catherine Mulholland, former member of the New Hampshire House of Representatives
- Atukwei Okai (MPhil, 1971), Ghanaian poet, cultural activist and academic
- Sir Bernard Pares (first Director of SSEES, Professor of Russian Language, Literature and History, 1919–1939)
- László Péter (lecturer then Chair of Hungarian history, 1963–1994)
- Martyn Rady (current Masaryk Professor of Central European History)
- Sir John Randall (BA Serbo-Croatian language and literature, 1979), former Deputy Chief Whip of the House of Commons
- Anna Reid (History), historian, journalist and author
- Jacek Rostowski (BSc, MA, 1973, then lecturer, 1988–95) former Minister of Finance and Deputy Prime Minister of Poland
- Jonathan Ross (Modern European History), UK TV presenter
- Andrew Rothstein (lecturer in Russian and Soviet History, 1946–1950), journalist and founding member of the Communist Party of Great Britain
- Mike Sarne (BA), actor, film director and singer of the 1962 UK number one song, "Come Outside"
- Edward Schofield, curator at the British Museum and British Library
- György Schöpflin (former Jean Monnet Professor of Politics), Hungarian Member of the European Parliament
- Robert Service (former lecturer in Russian History), historian and author
- Hugh Seton-Watson (Chair of Russian History, 1951–1983)
- R. W. Seton-Watson (founder of SSEES, Masaryk Professor of Central European History, 1922–45), political activist and historian
- Robin Shepherd, political commentator
- Arman Soldin, journalist
- Nick Taussig (MA in Russian Literature), author and film producer
- Trevor Thomas (former lecturer in Czech and Slovak History)
- Mihai Răzvan Ungureanu (former teaching fellow), former Prime Minister of Romania, former Minister of Foreign Affairs of Romania
- Doreen Warriner (development economist)
