= Eva Ladipo =

German journalist and author

Eva Ladipo (née Busse) (born 1974) is an author and journalist who writes about contemporary social issues for a variety of German broadsheet newspapers, including the Frankfurter Allgemeine Zeitung, Die Welt, and Die Zeit.

Her first novel, Wende, was woven around the conjecture that Germany's Energiewende (its turn away from nuclear energy) was nurtured by Kremlin operatives keen on maintaining the country's dependence on Russian gas pipelines. It also articulated what Der Spiegel called the "not entirely implausible" idea that Stasi machinations may have laid the foundations for Germany's red-green coalition.

Her second novel, Räuber, was a roman à clef that spotlighted the techniques used by Berlin property developers to successfully co-opt local politicians and NIMBY interests into driving up rental prices to levels that are unaffordable for many of the city's working-class inhabitants.

Her third book, Not am Mann, looks at the crisis of masculinity in a post-industrial world. It asks what happens when a society stops telling men stories with which they can identify. And it analyses how pop culture, politics, and media have left a dangerous vacuum that has been "filled by right-wing influencers, toxic men's forums, and authoritarian role models".

Eva has also written about the heavy shadow of the Holocaust, about her own ancestors' participation in this genocide, and about Germany's ongoing failure to learn the moral lessons from its dark past.

== Early life and education ==
Eva was born in 1974 and grew up in West Germany. She has also lived and worked in Russia, Colombia, England and the United States. For her undergraduate degree, she read Social and Political Sciences at the University of Cambridge, where she was a member of Girton College. She then stayed at the university to complete a PhD on the Russian Tax System, under the supervision of Alena Ledeneva.

== Career ==
Eva has held journalistic positions as an editor, department head, and correspondent for the Frankfurter Allgemeine Zeitung, Financial Times Deutschland, Vanity Fair., Financial Times, and Die Welt.

Her first novel, Wende, was published by Picus Verlag in 2015, where it was described by the Austrian Newspaper Die Presse as tackling "controversial" subjects and challenging "prevailing narratives" about the Green Party, its stance on the nuclear industry, and life in the former East Germany. In November 2015, it was chosen as the "book of the week" by SWR2, one of Germany's major public-service cultural radio stations, for its "entertaining and thought provoking" synthesis between "political thriller and social novel".. Stern (magazine) described Wende as "very decent suspense literature that deals with German sensitivities in a refreshingly blunt manner". By contrast, in the opinion of Die Tageszeitung, although the book offers a "solid whodunnit crime structure", "certain basic assertions" in the novel "are factually or ideologically alienating...such as the claim that nuclear power protects the climate".

Her second novel, Räuber, was published by Blessing Verlag in 2021 and was reviewed by numerous media outlets, including the Frankfurter Allgemeine Sonntagszeitung, the Süddeutsche Zeitung, Die Welt, and the Berliner Morgenpost. In the opinion of the latter publication, the novel's depiction of two star-crossed lovers and their covert fight against the gentrification of the Berlin Housing Market is "as gripping as it is relevant" and is a handy guide for "anyone who wants to learn about Berlin and its people".. In a long review of the novel - and of the dire conditions that make housing increasingly expensive in Berlin - the Berliner Zeitung also welcomes the way in which this pressing social issue forms the backdrop for a "lively plot" and the depiction of an "authentic Berlin mix". But it laments the fact that, in the wake of the death of the rent cap, Berlin's renters are reduced to seeking cold comfort from warm novels.

Eva's views on the Israeli-Palestinian conflict have also been the subject of debate in several German and British newspapers. Her critics have argued that given her grandfather and great-uncle were Nazi war criminals, it is morally insensitive for her to voice criticisms of the German government's support for Israel's actions in Gaza. But her defenders, including Sir Konrad Schiemann, have defended her right to argue that although her country's solidarity with Israel is, and must, remain a "sacred obligation", this moral obligation does not grant Germans a right to turn a blind eye to the suffering and grievances of Palestinians.

Her third book, Not am Mann: Die Erfindung toxischer Männlichkeit, will be published by Reclam Verlag on 18 March 2026. It expands on an article that Eva wrote for the German Magazine Emma in which she analysed the way in which political parties that were "traditionally allied with the socially disadvantaged" have increasingly turned their backs on working-class boys and men, demonising them as "toxic, dangerous, and incorrigible".

== Personal life ==
Eva is married and has two children.

During the Second World War, Eva's great-uncle, Walter Warlimont, was the head of the national defence department in the German Armed Forces High Command. He was sentenced to life imprisonment at the Nuremberg High Command Trial.
