= Robin Baker =

Robin Baker may refer to:

- Robin Baker (biologist) (born 1944), British evolutionary biologist and author of Sperm Wars
- Robin Baker (academic) (born 1953), British academic and Vice-Chancellor of Canterbury Christ Church University
