= Geoffrey Hosking =

British historian (born 1942)

Geoffrey Hosking OBE FBA FRHistS
- Born: 28 April 1942 (age 84); Troon, Ayrshire, Scotland
- Occupation: Historian
- Known for: Co-founder of Nightline

Academic background
- Education: King's College, Cambridge (M.A., Ph.D.); Moscow State University; St. Antony's College, Oxford

Academic work
- Institutions: University of Essex; SSEES

Geoffrey Alan Hosking OBE FBA FRHistS (born 28 April 1942) is a British historian of Russia and the Soviet Union and formerly Leverhulme Research Professor of Russian History at the School of Slavonic and East European Studies (SSEES) at University College, London. He also co-founded Nightline.

== Education ==
Born in Troon, Ayrshire, Scotland, Hosking attended Maidstone Grammar School in Kent and studied Russian at King's College, Cambridge, earning an MA, before going on to further study of Russian history at Moscow State University. He then studied European history at St. Antony's College, Oxford, before earning a PhD in modern Russian history at Cambridge.

== Career ==
He taught at the University of Essex as a Lecturer, Senior Lecturer, and then Reader from 1966 to 1984, before joining SSEES, where he held the established chair of Russian History from 1984 to 2007. He also held a Leverhulme Research Professorship in Russian History at SSEES from 1999 to 2004.

He has been a visiting lecturer in political science at the University of Wisconsin–Madison, a research fellow at Columbia University's Russian Institute, and a visiting professor at the University of Cologne.

Hosking presented the BBC Reith Lectures in 1988. His aim was to explain the dramatic changes of the Mikhail Gorbachev era in their historical context.

Most of Hosking's works until this point had dealt with twentieth-century Russia and the Soviet Union, but after the collapse of the Soviet system he turned his attention to earlier periods of Russian history, producing Russia: People and Empire, 1552-1917 and Russia and the Russians. In these books, Hosking emphasized the polarity between the Russian Imperial idea (denoted by the term 'Rossia') and Russia's ethnic nationhood (defined by the older term of 'Rus'). According to Hosking, the development of the Russian Empire prevented the development of Russia as a nation state. In his next book Rulers and Victims - The Russians in the Soviet Union, Hosking examined aspects of this polarity in the Soviet context.

Hosking retired from UCL SSEES in December 2007. The established chair that he held was reinaugurated in 2008 as the Sir Bernard Pares chair of Russian History. Its first incumbent was Hosking's former research student, Simon Dixon. From 2016 to 2017, he served as a director/trustee of the School of Civic Education in London (formerly the School of Political Studies in Moscow), which forms part of an association of schools of political studies, under the auspices of the Directorate General of Democracy (“DGII”) of the Council of Europe.

Hosking was appointed Officer of the Order of the British Empire (OBE) in the 2015 New Year Honours for services to higher education and to students.

== Bibliography ==
- The Russian Constitutional Experiment: Government and the Duma 1907–1914 (1973)
- Beyond Socialist Realism: Soviet Fiction since Ivan Denisovich (1980)
- A History of the Soviet Union (1985)
- Hosking, Geoffrey A. (1991). The Awakening of the Soviet Union. Harvard University Press. ISBN 978-0-674-05551-3.
- The First Socialist Society: A History of the Soviet Union from Within (1992, Second Enlarged Edition of A History of the Soviet Union)
- A History of the USSR: 1917–1991 (1992)
- Russia: People and Empire, 1552–1917 (1998) Harvard University Press ISBN 0-674-78119-8
- Russia and the Russians (2001)
- Rulers and Victims: The Russians in the Soviet Union (2005)
- Epochs of European Civilization: Reformation to the Twenty-First Century (2006) audio lecture. University College London
- Trust: Money, Markets and Society (2010)
- Trust: A History (2014) Oxford University Press
