= László Péter =

Emeritus professor of Hungarian history

- Born: 8 July 1929; Rákosliget
- Died: 6 June 2008 (aged 78); London
- Education: Doctor of Philosophy
- Alma mater: Nuffield College; Eötvös Loránd University
- Employer: University College London
- Awards: Officer's Cross of the Hungarian Order of Merit (1992); Commander Cross of the Order of Merit of the Hungarian Republic (2007)
- Position held: lecturer (1963–), professor (1990–)

László Péter (July 8, 1929 – June 6, 2008) was Emeritus Professor of Hungarian History at the University of London. He completed his first degree at the Eötvös Loránd University of Budapest after which he worked as an archivist and teacher. He left Hungary in 1956, subsequently completing a DPhil at Nuffield College, University of Oxford under the supervision of C. A. Macartney and John Plamenatz. In 1961, he was appointed to a lectureship at SSEES and to a full chair in 1990. He retired in 1994.

László Péter published extensively on the constitutional history of Hungary and the Habsburg monarchy, mostly in the nineteenth century. He was an External Member of the Hungarian Academy of Sciences and a Fellow of University College London.

During the Hungarian Revolution of 1956, Péter was appointed to the revolutionary committee charged with the supervision and cataloguing of the archives of the Ministry of the Interior. His report on his activities, compiled shortly after his flight to the UK, is published in (eds Péter and Martyn Rady) Resistance, Rebellion and Revolution in Hungary and Central Europe: Commemorating 1956, London (UCL SSEES), 2008, pp. 321–40.

Some of Péter's most significant essays and studies were collected, edited and published in Hungary's Long Nineteenth Century: Constitutional and Democratic Traditions in a European Perspective. Collected Studies by László Péter, edited by Miklós Lojkó, Leiden and Boston: Brill, 2012. 477 pages. ISBN 978 90 04 22212 0.
