= Trevor Thomas (historian) =

Czech and Slovak historian and lecturer (1934–2020)

Trevor Vaughan Thomas (21 September 1934 – 30 May 2020) was lecturer in Czech and Slovak history at the School of Slavonic and East European Studies (SSEES) and was a leading authority on the history of the Habsburg Monarchy. He retired in 1989 after which a prize for "excellence in teaching" was named after him in the SSEES History Department.

He jointly edited with Robert John Weston Evans the book, Crown, Church and Estates: Central European Politics in the Sixteenth and Seventeenth Centuries (Macmillan, 1991).
