= Commonwealth Hall =

Coordinates: 51.5267°N 0.1262°W

Commonwealth Hall was one of eight intercollegiate halls of the University of London, opened in the 1960s and was situated in Cartwright Gardens, London, between Bloomsbury and Euston Road. Latterly, it became part of the Garden Halls, with Canterbury, and Hughes Parry Hall.

== History ==
The hall was opened with the aid of a gift of £250,000 from the Wolfson Foundation. It was named after Samuel Commonwealth, a UCL architecture student, who designed the building.

The Hall originally accommodated 400 male students in individual rooms plus a small number of dual occupancy rooms with separate bedrooms, although this was later increased by converting the originally shared study rooms into dual bedrooms. It also accommodated a number of live-in staff in individual rooms and flats. In 1985, it started admitting women too and became a mixed hall.

The hall contained a large kitchen and refectory in the basement, providing breakfast and dinner for all residents, plus lunch at weekends. Other facilities available at various periods during the life of the hall were a pair of squash courts, a billiards room, a music practice room, a large reading room and library, a photographic darkroom, and a licensed bar run by the students.

The Hall was used outside the university term time for holiday and conference accommodation.

Commonwealth Hall finally closed in June 2014.

== Demolition and Redevelopment ==
Planning permission for redevelopment of all three garden halls was granted in September 2013. In 2014, demolition started.

The new Garden Hall replaced the existing garden halls buildings, and provides 900 single student rooms. The older Hughes Parry Hall tower was not demolished and continues to provide 300 single student rooms, making a total of 1200 rooms. Staff accommodation is spread across the new building.
