= Tolkach =

Type of employee in the Soviet Union

The tolkachs (Russian: толкачи, IPA: [təlkɐˈt͡ɕi], lit. pushers) emerged in the Soviet Union as employees of enterprises whose role was to use informal connections to enable production managers to meet or manipulate targeted outputs imposed by the central economic plan. They evolved in the context of the various Five Year Plans helping them to work by violating their core principles: i.e. as success was determined by meeting the targets, using persuasion to have targets reduced was a means of achieving success.

The tolkachs were premier practitioners of blat, a contemporaneous Russian term to describe the procurement of favours. By 1937 the tolkachs had come to occupy a key position mediating between the enterprises and the commissariat.
