= Carlile Aylmer Macartney =

Carlile Aylmer Macartney FBA (1895–1978) was a British academic specialising in the history and politics of East-Central Europe and in particular the history of Austria and Hungary. He was also a supporter of Hungarian interests and causes in the United Kingdom.

== Career ==
His education included time at Winchester College (where he was a scholar) and at Trinity College, Cambridge.

Macartney was a research fellow of All Souls College, Oxford. From 1936 to 1946 he was in charge of the Hungarian section of the Foreign Office Research Department. From 1951 to 1957 he was Montague Burton Professor of International Relations at the University of Edinburgh.

Macartney was a corresponding member of the Austrian and Hungarian academies, and in 1965 he became a member of the British Academy. In 1974, Macartney was awarded the Grand Decoration of Honour in Gold for Services to the Republic of Austria.

== Personal life ==
Macartney was the son of painter and orientalist Carlile Henry Hayes Macartney (1842-1924). In 1923 he married Nedelya Mamacheva (Nedella Mamarchev-Macartney, 1898 – 1989) the daughter of a Bulgarian army colonel: there were no recorded children of this marriage.

== Works ==
- The Social Revolution in Austria (Cambridge, 1926).
- The Magyars in the Ninth Century (Cambridge, 1930).
- Refugees: The Work of the League (London, 1931).
- Hungary (London, 1934).
- National States and National Minorities (London, 1934).
- Hungary and Her Successors: The Treaty of Trianon and Its Consequences (Oxford, 1937).
- Studies on the Earliest Hungarian Historical Sources, 3 vols. (Budapest, 1938–51).
- Problems of the Danube Basin (Cambridge, 1942).
- The Medieval Hungarian Historians: A Critical and Analytical Guide (London, 1953).
- October Fifteenth: A History of Modern Hungary, 1929-1945, 2 vols. (Edinburgh, 1956).
- Hungary: A Short History (Edinburgh, 1962).
- Independent Eastern Europe: A History (London & New York, 1962) [co-written with A. W. Palmer].
- The Habsburg Empire, 1790–1918 (London, 1968).
- Maria Theresa and the House of Austria (London, 1969).
- The House of Austria: The Later Phase, 1790-1918 (Edinburgh, 1978).
- Studies on Early Hungarian and Pontic History, edited by Lóránt Czigány and László Péter (Aldershot, 1998) [collected articles].
