= David Kirby (historian) =

David G. Kirby is a former professor of Modern European History at the School of Slavonic and East European Studies in London, which is today part of University College London.

== Selected bibliography ==
- Finland in the Twentieth Century (1979)
- Northern Europe in the Early Modern Period (1990)
- The Baltic World 1772–1993 (1995)
- The Baltic and the North Seas, with Merja-Liisa Hinkkanen (2000)
- A Concise History of Finland (2006)

== Lectures ==
- "European Integration and the Baltic Region: A Historical Perspective." (May 28–29, 1998. See https://web.archive.org/web/20110217103250/http://depts.washington.edu/baltic/newsletter/spring98.html#kirby )

== Contributor ==
- Baltic Worlds, http://balticworlds.com/contributors/david-kirby/
