= Martyn Rady =

English academic (born 1955)

- Born: 1955 (age 70–71)

Academic background
- Education: University of London

Academic work
- Institutions: University College London
- Doctoral students: Eleanor Janega, Jamie Bulloch

Martyn Rady (born 1955) is Masaryk Professor Emeritus of Central European History at the School of Slavonic and East European Studies (SSEES), University College London (UCL). He was from 1995 to 2009 Warden of Hughes Parry Hall, an intercollegiate hall of the University of London. He retired from UCL in December 2020. He lives in Stroud in Gloucestershire.

== Career ==
Martyn Rady was educated at Caterham School and Westfield College, University of London, where he read for a BA in History. He went on to do postgraduate work at the University of London and the Hungarian Academy of Sciences, which he attended as a British Council exchange student. While a teacher at Mill Hill School in the 1980s Rady wrote several books for sixth-formers, including Emperor Charles V (Longman, 1987). He moved to SSEES in 1990, where he had previously completed his PhD, publishing books and articles primarily on the history of Romania and Hungary. His principal academic interest is Hungarian legal history and the translation of medieval Latin texts. In retirement, he has published books aimed at the popular market, The Habsburgs: The Rise and Fall of a World Power (2020) and The Middle Kingdoms: A New History of Central Europe (2023). From 1998 to 2020 he was General Editor of The Slavonic and East European Review. In 2004 he was made an Honorary Life Member of the Modern Humanities Research Association. He was appointed Professor of Central European History in 2004 and awarded the established Masaryk Chair in 2015. He holds honorary doctorates from the Károli Gaspar University in Budapest and the Lucian Blaga University of Sibiu in Romania.

== Publications ==
Rady's publications include:

- Medieval Buda: A Study of Municipal Government and Jurisdiction in the Kingdom of Hungary (East European Monographs, 1985).
- The Netherlands: Revolt and Independence, 1550-1650 (Hodder & Stoughton, 1987) (Access to History series); renamed From Revolt to Independence: The Netherlands, 1550-1650 (1990)
- Emperor Charles V (Longman, 1988) (Seminar Studies in History series)
- France: Renaissance, Religion and Recovery, 1494-1610 (Hodder & Stoughton, 1989) (Access to History series)
- Russia, Poland and the Ukraine 1462-1725 (Hodder & Stoughton, 1990) (Access to History series); renamed The Tsars, Russia, Poland and the Ukraine
- Romania in Turmoil: A Contemporary History (IB Tauris, 1992)
- (ed. with Peter J.S. Duncan) Towards a New Community: Culture and Politics in Post- Totalitarian Europe (SSEES and LitVerlag, 1993)
- (joint author) Cultural Atlas of the Renaissance (Prentice-Hall/Time-Life, 1993)
- Nobility, Land and Service in Medieval Hungary (Palgrave, 2000)
- Customary Law in Hungary: Courts, Texts, and the Tripartitum (OUP, 2015)
- (ed. with László Péter and P. Sherwood) 'Lajos Kossuth Sent Word...' Papers delivered on the occasion of the bicentenary of Kossuth's Birth (SSEES, 2003)
- (ed.) Custom and Law in Central Europe (Cambridge Centre for European Law, 2003)
- (ed. with László Péter) British-Hungarian Relations Since 1848 (SSEES, 2004)
- (ed. & trans with J. Bak and P. Banyo): Werbőczy, The Customary Law of the Renowned Kingdom of Hungary: A Work in Three Parts (the Tripartitum) (CEU and Schlacks, Budapest and Idyllwild, 2005)
- (ed. with László Péter): Resistance, Rebellion and Revolution in Hungary and Central Europe: Commemorating 1956 (London, 2008)
- The Habsburgs: The Rise and Fall of a World Power (Allen Lane, 2020; also published by Basic Books as The Habsburgs: To Rule the World)
- The Middle Kingdoms: A New History of Central Europe (Allen Lane and Basic Books, 2023)
