= Edward Schofield =

Arthur Norman Edward Delsart Schofield, FRHS (26 June 1925 – 9 March 2009) was a curator and archivist at the British Museum, and later the British Library.

== Early life ==
Edward Schofield was born in Rochdale in 1925, the son of Henry Schofield and his Belgian wife, Simone Delsart. In the 1930s, the family made annual summer visits to Belgium.

He was educated at the schools of the Pallottine Missionary Sisters in Rochdale, and the Salesian Fathers in Bolton, before studying at the UCL School of Slavonic and East European Studies in London, which today forms part of University College London. In 1957, he obtained a doctorate from the University of London with a dissertation on "England and the Council of Basel".

He was a founder member of the Ecclesiastical History Society, and on the scholarly committee of the international journal Annuarium Historiae Conciliorum. His scholarly articles were published under the name A.N.E.D. Schofield.

== Intelligence work ==
From 1958 to 1961 he worked in intelligence, first at the Ministry of Defence and then at the Central Office of Information, where he compiled reference works on Middle Eastern countries.

== Archivist ==
In 1961 Schofield moved to the British Museum, as a research assistant in the Department of Manuscripts. From 1974 to 1986 he was assistant keeper of manuscripts at the British Library. His catalogue of the papers of Viscount Cecil of Chelwood, completed in 1987 and published in 1991, was the first to be produced digitally.

Schofield curated the British Library exhibition The English Country Parson (25 September 1980 to 4 January 1981) and edited the exhibition catalogue.

After retirement he volunteered at the archive of the Archdiocese of Westminster, where he indexed the papers of Cardinal Heenan.

== Sources ==
- Edward Schofield: medievalist and curator, Obituary in The Times, 28 April 2009.
