= Margaret Stevenson Miller =

British campaigner for women's rights and lecturer

Margaret Stevenson Miller (1896 – 1979) was a British lecturer and researcher, who campaigned for women's rights.

She began her studies at the University of Edinburgh, where she was the first ever graduate with a Bachelor of Commerce degree from that institution in 1920. She then gained her PhD at the School of Slavonic and East European Studies (now part of University College London). Margaret learned Russian, and visited and corresponded with Beatrice Webb.

Margaret joined the Department of Commerce at the University of Liverpool in 1928 and married a colleague, C Douglas Campbell in 1932, author of British Railways in Boom and Bust. Although British universities did employ married women, on the recommendation of the Vice Chancellor, Dr H J W Hetherington, the University of Liverpool Council exceptionally introduced a marriage bar in February 1933 that forced her to resign. The resulting protest was taken up by other groups campaigning for equality for women, including the feminist Six Point Group, The British Federation of University Women which led to the Campaign of Right for the Married Women to Earn. Despite the University Council overturning the bar in 1934, Margaret was not reinstated in her post, and although her post was advertised, she was advised not to apply.

During World War II Miller worked as a research strategist in Soviet affairs as part of the Political Intelligence Department's Foreign Research and Press Service in Oxford, at the Office of Strategic Services in Washington, and after the war she briefly worked in the Foreign Office's Economic Intelligence Department. After her appointment to the Central Electricity Authority, she continued to write, lecture and broadcast on Soviet economics until her death in 1979.

== Library holdings ==
Her writings 1920-1930 are held in The Women's Library: a collection of her papers on the economy of the Soviet Union (1929-1975) is stored in the library of UCL School of Slavonic and East European Studies.
