= Adel Darwish =

British journalist (born 1944)

Adel Alexander Darwish
- عادل درويش
- Born: 1944 (age 81–82); Alexandria, Egypt
- Other names: Adel Alexander, A Darwish
- Education: London University
- Occupations: Political journalist, author, historian, broadcaster, political commentator
- Years active: Africa: 1967–1970; Middle East: 1970–2002; Westminster: 2002–present
- Employer(s): World Media, Middle East News, The Middle East Magazine, The Tribune
- Notable work: Numerous books

Adel Alexander Darwish (Arabic: عادل درويش, IPA: [ˈʕæːdel dæɾˈwiːʃ]) is a Westminster-based British political journalist, a veteran Fleet Street reporter, author, historian, broadcaster, and political commentator. Darwish is currently (since 2002) a parliament lobby correspondent based at the Press Gallery of the House of Commons, the Palace of Westminster, specialising in foreign affairs, especially Middle Eastern politics; London University Graduate/Post Graduate 1965/1966–1967.

Darwish is a veteran Fleet Street foreign correspondent and has worked for The Daily Mail, The Daily Telegraph, The Independent, The Daily Express, The News of The World, The Scotsman, Scotland on Sunday, The YorkShire Post, The Washington Post and The Times, and many international newspapers and publications in North America, Asia and the Middle East, as well as maintaining his online blog and publishing several books. He is currently the political editor of World Media, Middle East News and The Middle East Magazine, and a regular contributor to The Tribune.

== Early life ==
Darwish was born in Alexandria in 1944, during the Second World War, to a family from the Balkans and central Europe. His parents are believed to have held British citizenship and lived for years in Britain. His father, was postmaster in Alexandria when the local postal service was run by the British government.

After attending British schools in Alexandria, Darwish moved to Britain After the Suez War (between 1956 – 1959) where he studied for A levels then to London University. He graduated in 1966, having also spent four semesters in the academic year 1963-1964 at Alexandria University as part of his study of Middle Eastern history.

After university, Darwish began his journalistic career in Africa, as a correspondent for several British Fleet Street newspapers, before moving to the Middle East to cover events there. Darwish reported on the Dawson's Field hijackings of several aircraft by the Palestinian radical group, the Popular Front for the Liberation of Palestine (PFLP), in 1970, and the ensuing Black September clashes in Jordan.

Darwish was also sent to Egypt, Lebanon, Libya, Sudan and Iraq between 1970 and 1972. While in Iraq, he met Saddam Hussein, at that time still relatively unknown in the West and just beginning his political career as shadow deputy leader of the local Baath Party and vice-chairman of the Iraqi Revolutionary Command Council. There is an amusing well known story in Fleet Street about the occasion when Darwish, along with another Middle East correspondent, John Bulloch, met Saddam Hussein, who invited "her majesty's press corps" to a glass of the Iraqi national drink, which turned out to be a bottle of Black Label Whisky. That evening, Mr Deputy, as Saddam Hussein was known then, out-drank the entire Fleet Street mission to Baghdad. In 1973, Darwish became a Middle East-based correspondent, and went on to cover that year's Yom Kippur War, in which Egypt, Iraq, Jordan and Syria attacked Israel to recapture land lost in the 1967 Six-Day War.

== Journalistic career ==
Adel Darwish is currently the Political Editor of the Middle East Group, based at the Parliamentary Press Gallery at the House of Commons of the United Kingdom in Westminster.

A prolific writer, Darwish covered the Iran–Iraq War (1980–1988), the Lebanese Civil War (1975–1990), the Egypt–Israel peace treaty (1980), the assassination of Egyptian President Anwar Al Sadat (1981) and his state funeral, and the Gulf War (1991).

Darwish was the first journalist in the world to expose Saddam Hussein's missile programme after an explosion in al-Hella, a facility south of Baghdad, killed over 800 people in August 1987. Darwish, together with Pierre Salinger, also had a scoop when he obtained the transcripts of the meetings between United States' Ambassador April Glaspie and Saddam Hussein a week before the Iraqi Invasion of Kuwait, in which Hussein made clear his aggressive intentions without any objections from Glaspie. Darwish's story was printed in The Independent in August 1990 with an agreement from Salinger that ABC News would air the story a few hours later. The day before, Darwish had published a story on the meeting between the American chargé d'affaires, Joseph C. Wilson, and Saddam Hussein on 6 August 1990, when the Iraqi President offered to give America oil below market price if he were to annex Kuwait.

Strengthening Darwish's position as a leading regional investigative reporter during his time at The Independent (1986–1998), Darwish published numerous exclusive stories, including his exposé on Libyan leader Colonel Muammar al-Gaddafi's chemical weapons factory at Rabta; the attempt on al-Gaddafi's life during a visit by the late Syrian President Hafez al-Assad; and the Libyan leader's efforts to buy a nuclear-powered submarine from a Russian captain. Darwish also revealed secret talks between Syria and Israel; the 1988 secret missile deal between Saudi Arabia and China; and the role of the United States Navy and Air Force in supporting Saddam Hussein during the Iran–Iraq War and Hussein's long-standing relationship with the United States' Central Intelligence Agency. He was among the first writers to use the term "Islamists" to refer to Islamic extremists employing violence.

Personally acquainted with most Middle Eastern leaders and statesmen, Darwish also had close ties to British Arabists and Foreign Office officials active in the region, known as the Camel Corps. The many obituaries he has written for The Independent, numbering more than 200, give a unique insight into a century of Middle Eastern history and the interaction of the British Empire and the Arab world.

Darwish worked as a fleet street correspondent and stringer in Jerusalem, Cairo, Tehran, Beirut, Bahrain, and as a roving correspondent in Africa and the Middle East.

For a period of approximately nine months and until December 2008, Darwish was director of the UK-based research organization Just Journalism. He resigned citing disagreements with the organisation's chairwoman and founder, on the issue of neutrality.

As well as The Independent and The Daily Telegraph, Darwish has worked for The Times and his articles have been printed in The Daily Mail, The Daily Express, The Scotsman, The Washington Post and The Economist magazine. He frequently appears as a commentator on the BBC, Sky News and ITN, as well as major American and Canadian networks and Arabic-language television stations, including Nile TV and Kuwait TV.

== Theatre ==
As a playwright, Darwish has been involved in British theatre, with some of his plays performed at the Edinburgh Festival and at the Young Vic and several Fringe theatres in London during the 1970s. Most of his plays are adaptations of poems and short stories from Africa, especially from Egypt.

== Awards ==
In 2008, Adel Darwish won the Cutting Edge Prize ("for an outstanding new ideas and contribution to peace and understanding via Journalism") from the Next Century Foundation's International Council for Press and Broadcasting media council awards, for his contribution to better understanding both in and towards the Middle East. At the International Media Awards in 2017 he was awarded the Lifetime Achievement Award for the positive impact his work has had on coverage of the Middle East.

== Publications ==
- Darwish, Adel: Alexandria Adieu: A Personal History, (London : Nomad Publishing; London, 2022). ISBN 978-1-914325-00-7
- Alexander, Gregory and Darwish, Adel: Unholy Babylon: The Secret History of Saddam's War, (London: Gollancz; New York: St. Martin's Press, 1991). ISBN 978-0-312-06531-7.
- Bulloch, John and Darwish, Adel: Water Wars: Coming Conflicts in the Middle East, (London: Gollancz, 1993). ISBN 978-0-575-05533-9.
- Darwin, Alex (pen name): The Edge of War, Kuwait's Underground Resistance, Khafji 1990-1991 (London: Gulf Museum Consultancy Company, 2011). ISBN 978-0-95686340-9
- Darwish, Adel: Halabja: whom does the truth hurt? at openDemocracy.
- Darwish, Adel:Showdown interview with CNN :
- Darwish, Adel: Anti-Americanism in the Arabic Language Media in Middle East Review of International Affairs, 7, 4 (December 2003).
- Darwish, Adel; On reaction to 9/11 in the Middle East:
- Water Wars. A lecture given by Darwish to the Geneva Conference on Environment and Quality of Life. (June 1994).
- Darwish, Adel: Middle East Water Wars, BBC. Updated 30 May 2003. Retrieved 6 December 2008.
- Darwish, Adel; In the anniversary of Iraq's murder of Observer reporter Farzad Bazoft:
