= Hughes Parry Hall, London =

Coordinates: 51°31′39″N 0°7′36″W

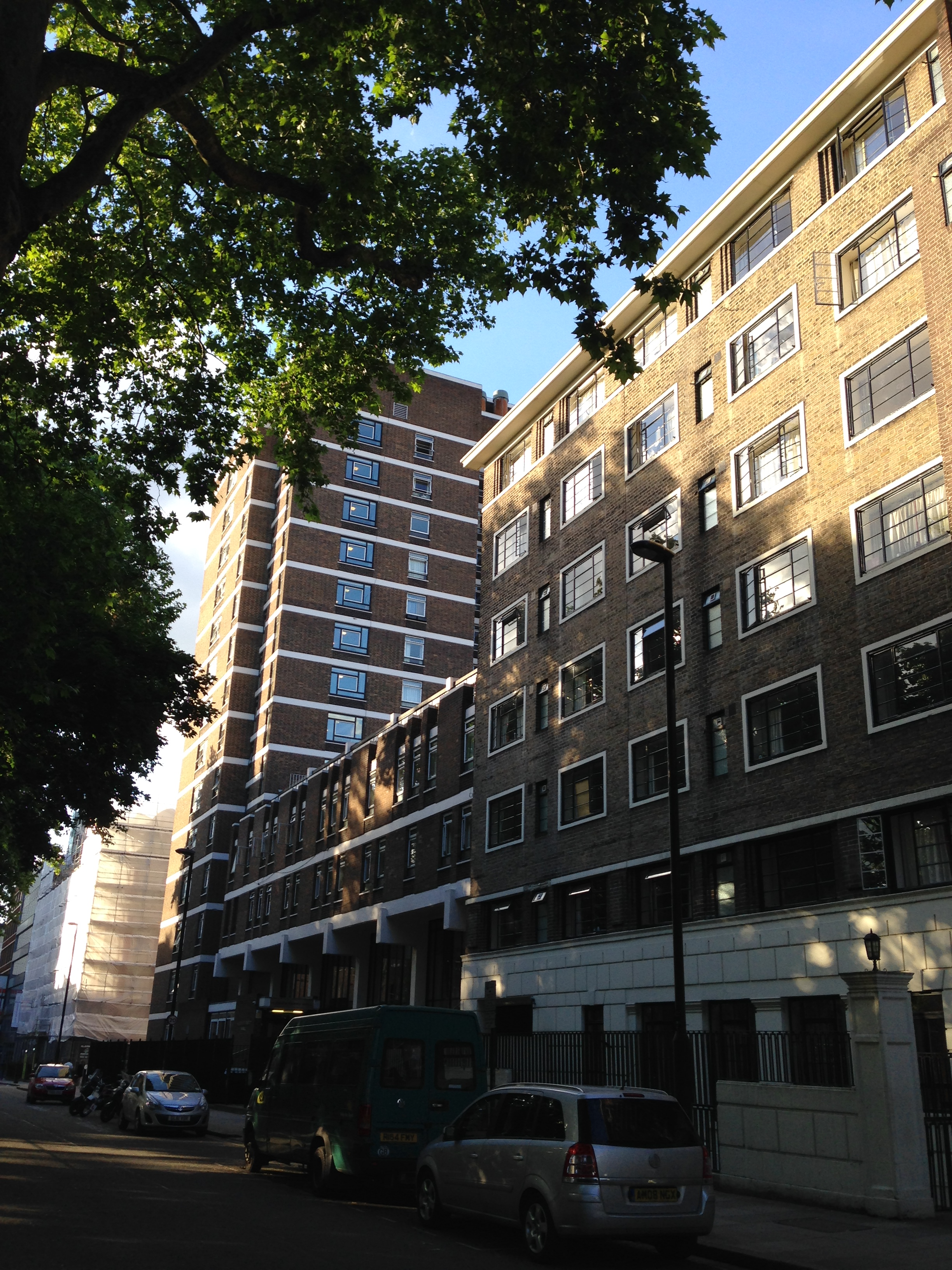
Hughes Parry Hall, taken shortly before the hall closed in June 2014.

Hughes Parry Hall was one of eight intercollegiate halls of the University of London. The Hall was part of the Garden Halls grouping administered by the bursarial team also responsible for Canterbury Hall and Commonwealth Hall.

At the time of writing Hughes Parry Hall is closed as part of the University of London's redevelopment of its student accommodation on Cartwright Gardens. In August 2013 the University received planning permission to redevelop the Garden Halls site. The hall's last residents moved out on 14 June 2014, after which the hall was closed.

The redevelopment is in progress and includes the demolition of a four storey wing of the original 1960s building. The 13 storey tower which forms the bulk of the building is being refurbished and will return as part of the redevelopment.

== Facilities ==
Prior to its closure in 2014 the hall accommodated just over 300 residents. The hall was open to students from all colleges, but because of its proximity to the colleges concerned students from UCL, King's and the LSE tended to dominate the student body. The hall was opened in 1969 and its design and facilities bore witness to the exigencies of that time: the thirteen-story tower block had shared bathroom facilities and there was little by way of communal kitchen arrangements (although the hall provided both breakfast and evening meals). There were squash courts, TV and games rooms, and an active student society, run by a committee drawn from the students. The hall also benefited from its location overlooking Cartwright Gardens in WC1 where tennis courts were available to residents. In the early days of the Hall, at Christmas the students were accustomed to wrap decorative paper around the life-size statue of John Cartwright in the Gardens that are named after him, though this tradition ceased in the 1970s.

== History ==
Although Hughes Parry Hall was affectionately known by some students as "Huge Party Hall", it is in fact named after the distinguished lawyer and Vice-Chancellor of the University, Sir David Hughes Parry (1893–1973).

The hall was originally for male students only; it became a mixed residence in 1971. The adjacent Canterbury (female) and Commonwealth (male) halls remained single-sex well into the 1980s;

== Wardens ==
The first warden, Dr Jeffery David Lewins, was appointed in December 1968. The first students were admitted in 1969 and the Hall was officially opened by the Chancellor of the university, her Majesty Queen Elizabeth the Queen Mother in February 1970. Dr Lewins spent ten years in the hall with his family.

For most of the 1980s the warden was Dr P Throsby, famed among students for his lavish invitation-only dinner parties.

From 1995 to 2009, the Warden of Hughes Parry Hall was Professor Martyn Rady. In 2009, Professor Rady was succeeded as Warden by his hitherto deputy, Dr Paul Stock. Fiona Elder retained responsibility as Bursar for Hughes Parry, for the other two halls in Cartwright Gardens and also for Connaught Hall and College Hall.
