= Eleanor Janega =

American medievalist

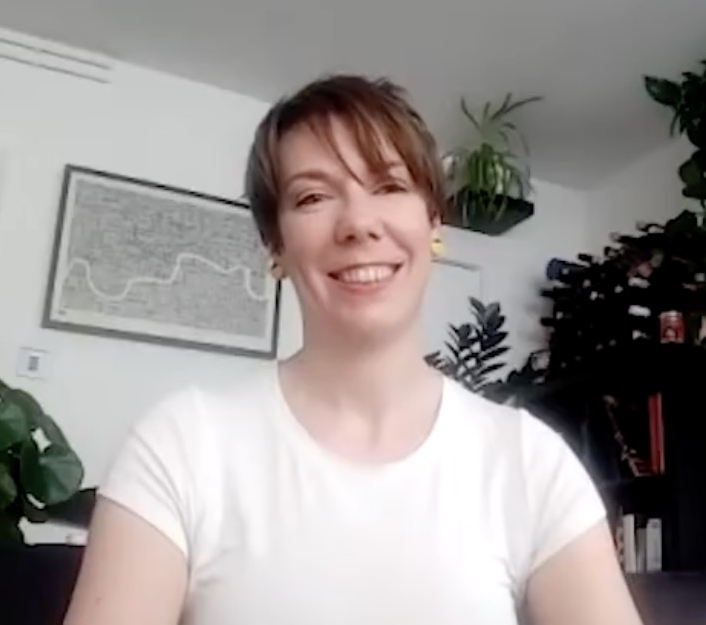

Academic background
- Education: Loyola University Chicago; University College London
- Thesis: Jan Milíč of Kroměříž and Emperor Charles IV: Preaching, Power, and the Church of Prague (2015)
- Doctoral advisor: Martyn Rady

Academic work
- Discipline: History
- Sub-discipline: Late Middle Ages; Apocalypticism; History of Prague; Urban history; History of human sexuality; Gender history
- Institutions: London School of Economics

Eleanor Janega (/ˈjɑːnəɡə/ YAH-nə-gə) is an American broadcaster and medievalist. Her scholarship focuses on gender and sexuality; apocalyptic thought; propaganda; and the urban experience, in the late medieval period.

== Biography ==
Janega was raised in Tacoma, Washington. She gained her BA in history (with honours) from Loyola University Chicago, and holds an MA (with distinction) in Medieval Studies and a PhD in history from University College London. She completed her PhD in 2015, writing her doctoral thesis on the 14th-century Bohemian preacher Milíč of Kroměříž. Her thesis was supervised by Martyn Rady, and was titled Jan Milíč of Kroměříž and Emperor Charles IV: Preaching, Power, and the Church of Prague.

She is a guest teacher in the London School of Economics Department of International History, and teaches a standalone online course on Medieval Gender and Sexuality.

Janega co-hosts the Going Medieval documentary strand on the History Hit streaming service. She also co-hosts the Gone Medieval podcast as well as the "We're Not So Different" podcast and has appeared as a talking head on radio and television.

== Selected publications ==
- Janega, Eleanor (2019). "Suspect Women: Prostitution, Reputation, and Gossip in Fourteenth-Century Prague" (PDF). In Mielke, Christopher; Znorovszky, Andrea-Bianka (eds.). Same bodies, different women : 'other' women in the middle ages and the early modern period. Budapest: Trivent. doi:10.22618/TP.HAA.20192. ISBN 978-615-81222-2-1. S2CID 243529846.
- "Opinion | Don't kid yourself. The Black Death's aftermath isn't cause for optimism about covid-19". Washington Post. 14 April 2020. ISSN 0190-8286.
- "Morality tales". Red Pepper. No. 233. ISSN 1353-7024.
- The Middle Ages: A Graphic History. London: Icon Books. 2021. ISBN 9781785785917.
- The Once and Future Sex: Going Medieval on Women's Roles in Society. London: WW Norton. 2023. ISBN 9780393867817.
