= Michael T. Ullman =

American neuroscientist (born 1962)

Michael Thomas Ullman
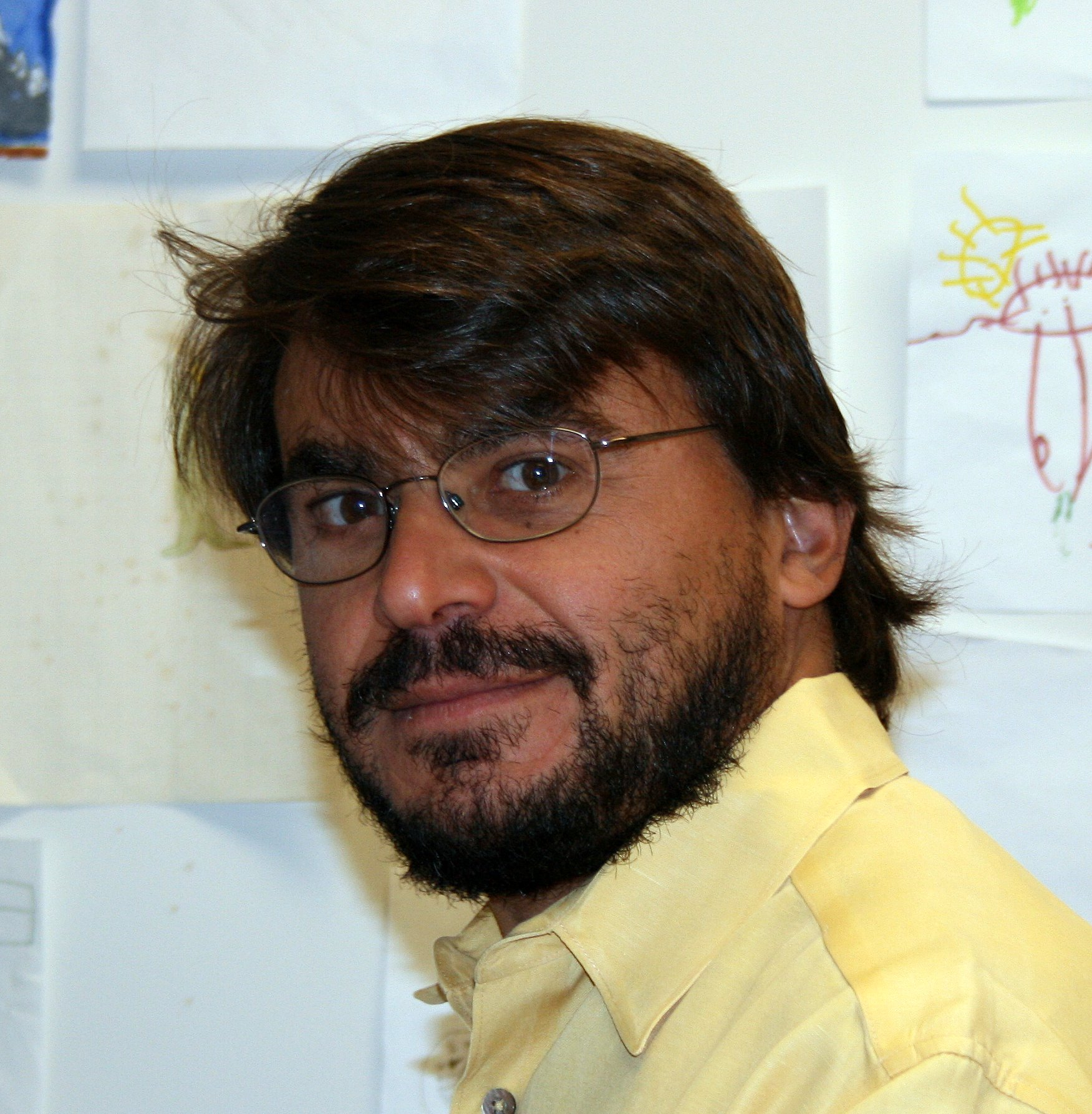
- Born: July 29, 1962 (age 64); San Francisco, California, USA
- Education: Massachusetts Institute of Technology (MIT); Harvard University
- Known for: Declarative/Procedural Model of language
- Scientific career
- Fields: Neuroscience
- Workplaces: Georgetown University

Michael T. Ullman (born July 29, 1962, San Francisco, California) is an American neuroscientist whose main field of research is the relationship between language, memory and the brain. He is best known for his Declarative/Procedural model of language.

== Early life and career ==
Ullman was born in San Francisco, California. He is an alumnus of the French American International School and Lowell High School (1976–1980), both in San Francisco. He received his BA in computer science from Harvard University in 1988 and his PhD from the Department of Brain and Cognitive Sciences, Massachusetts Institute of Technology in 1993. Ullman is currently a full professor at Georgetown University. His primary appointment is in the Department of Neuroscience (Georgetown University Medical Center), with secondary appointments in the Departments of Linguistics, Neurology and Psychology. He is the founding director of the Brain and Language Lab, founding co-director of the Center for the Brain Basis of Cognition, and founding director of the Georgetown Cognitive Neuroscience EEG/ERP Center. He was a Presidential Columnist for American Psychological Society Observer in 2005. He currently lives in Washington D.C., with his daughter Clementina Ullman.
