= Robin Baker (academic) =

British academic and former Vice-Chancellor of Canterbury Christ Church University

Robin William Baker CMG FRSA FRHistS (born 4 October 1953) is a British academic and former Vice-Chancellor of Canterbury Christ Church University. His research interests are Hungarian, Romanian and late Byzantine history, ethnic minorities in South-East Europe and heretical movements in the Middle Ages.

Robin Baker was educated at Bishop Wordsworth's School, and went on to graduate with a BA degree from the School of Slavonic and East European Studies (now part of University College London), and completed his PhD at the University of East Anglia in 1984 entitled "Innovation and variation in the case system of contemporary Komi dialects". He also spent time studying at the Stanford Graduate School of Business and is a Fellow of University College London.

He was the Deputy Director-General of the British Council (2002–2005) where he was responsible for the council's global operations, before becoming Pro Vice-Chancellor of the University of Kent (2005–2007). He was appointed a Companion of St Michael and St George (CMG) in 2005. He was appointed Vice-Chancellor of the University of Chichester in 2007 and became Vice-Chancellor of Canterbury Christ Church University in September 2010. He resigned in October 2012.

Baker was elected a Fellow of the Royal Historical Society in 2024.

Academic offices
Preceded by [Michael Wright]	Vice-Chancellor of Canterbury Christ Church University; 2010–2012	Succeeded by Andrew Ironside (Acting)
Preceded by Philip Robinson	Vice-Chancellor of the University of Chichester; 2007–2010	Succeeded by Clive Behagg
