= Robin Shepherd =

- Born: 6 January 1968 (age 58); Ilkley, West Yorkshire
- Education: London School of Economics; UCL School of Slavonic and East European Studies
- Occupations: Political commentator and analyst

Robin Shepherd (born 6 January 1968) is an Anglo-American advisor, and analyst specializing in the intersection of AI, political economy, and geopolitics. He is currently writing a book on democracy and the digital revolution entitled, Freedom Reloaded: Democracy's Return to Supremacy in the Digital Age. He was most recently a Global Fellow at the Washington DC-based Wilson Center, and an Advisor at Strider Technologies, a leading cyber security and international intelligence firm based in Salt Lake City. Formerly a senior fellow, running the Europe programme, at Chatham House (The Royal Institute of International Affairs) in London, he has also held fellowships with a number of leading think tanks in the United States and Europe including the Woodrow Wilson International Center for Scholars, the Center for Strategic and International Studies, and the German Marshall Fund of the United States. Shepherd was Executive Director, North America for GLOBSEC, Central and eastern Europe's pre-eminent think tank dedicated to democracy and international security. He previously served as vice president of the Halifax International Security Forum.

Shepherd began his working life as a journalist, in which capacity he worked for Reuters and The Times.

== Early life and education ==
Born in Ilkley, West Yorkshire, Shepherd attended Ilkley Grammar School, a state school in the north of England. He studied Russian at the School of Slavonic and East European Studies - which today forms part of University College London - and gained a master's degree in political theory from the London School of Economics.

== Career ==
In November 2020, Shepherd authored China Vs. Democracy: The Greatest Game, a "handbook for democracies" designed to set out the challenge posed to the world's democracies by a newly assertive China. In the course of the research, he, and the team he led, spoke to more than 250 dignitaries across the world, including several former US secretaries of state, secretaries of defense and heads of the CIA. The handbook has been translated into Chinese and French.

The early focus of his work was post-Communist transition in Eastern Europe and Russia, such as in his first book, Czechoslovakia: The Velvet Revolution and Beyond (Palgrave Macmillan/St. Martins Press, 2000), which dealt with the post-communist reform process. His research and commentary have since branched out into international security, transatlantic relations, European politics, the global democracy agenda, the impact of the digital revolution on politics and society, and the relationship between the Western world and the State of Israel. His second book, A State Beyond the Pale: Europe's Problem with Israel (Weidenfeld & Nicolson, 2009), was described by one reviewer as "the best book on the Middle East conflict to appear in years". Shepherd has also contributed to, and edited many other books and publications including Belarusian opposition leader Andrei Sannikov's biographical account of his time as a political prisoner in KGB jails and labour camps, My Story, which contains a foreword by Nobel Laureate Svetlana Alexievich.

Before entering the world of think tanks, he was the Moscow Bureau Chief for The Times. Prior to that he worked for eight years for Reuters in the Czech Republic, Slovakia, and London.

Shepherd believes he lost his job at Chatham House, which has had an awkward relationship over the years with Israel and the Jewish people, due to his expressing a non-hostile position on Israel.

== Books ==
- Shepherd, Robin (2000). Czechoslovakia: the velvet revolution and beyond. Basingstoke: Palgrave Macmillan. ISBN 9780312230685.
- Shepherd, Robin (2010). A state beyond the pale: Europe's problem with Israel. London: Phoenix. ISBN 9780753827130.
- Shepherd, Robin (2020). China Vs Democracy: The Greatest Game. Washington DC. Amazon.
