= Blat (favors) =

Form of corruption in the USSR and Russia

In Russian culture, blat (Russian: блат) is a form of corruption comprising a system of informal agreements, exchanges of services, connections, Party contacts, or black market deals to achieve results or get ahead.

In the context of corruption in the Soviet Union, blat was widespread because of the permanent shortage of consumer goods and services. This was due to the administrative-command economy and coexistent maladministration. Networks of blat made it easier for the general public to gain access to much-coveted goods and services. Blat also took place at the enterprise-level in the form of tolkachs, employees whose explicit role was to exploit their networks to secure positive outcomes for their employers.

The system of blat can be seen as an example of a social network with some similarities to networking (especially "good ol' boy" networks) in the United States, old boy networks in the United Kingdom and the former British Empire, and guanxi in China.

== In practice ==
While certain official privileges would be provided to citizens depending on status (as a party official, member of the intelligentsia, factory worker, or toiling peasant (Russian: трудящийся крестьянин)), access was by no means guaranteed even for the upper echelon, as "commodities like dachas and housing in a ministerial apartment block were in extremely short supply, and mere membership in the eligible group was not enough to secure the prize. To get privileges, [one] needed contacts with somebody higher up; in short, [one] needed a patron."

Another notable operation of blat system was the institution of tolkachs. In the Soviet Union, the Gosplan was not able to calculate efficient or even feasible plans, so enterprises often had to rely on people with connections, who could then use blat to help fulfill quotas. Eventually most enterprises came to have a dedicated supply specialist – a tolkach (literally "pusher") – to perform this task.

== Usage ==
Blat was primarily used to describe networks in which people made favors in exchange for other favors. Its adverbial usage is po blatu (по блату), meaning "by or via blat".

According to Max Vasmer, the origin of the word blat is the Yiddish blatt, meaning a "blank note" or a "list". However, according to both Vasmer and N. M. Shansky, blat may also have entered into Russian as the Polish loanword blat, a noun signifying "someone who provides an umbrella" or a "cover". The word became part of Imperial Russian criminal slang in the early 20th century, where it signified relatively minor criminal activity such as petty theft.

A similar term, protektsiya, literally means "protection", but with more emphasis on patronage. Another semantically related term, krysha, is derived from the criminal environment and literally means "a roof".

The noun blatnoy (блатной) has an explicitly criminal meaning in Russian. It usually refers to a member of a thief gang – blatnoy itself means "professional criminal". The term originally meant "one possessing the correct paperwork", which, in the corrupt officialdom of Imperial Russia and the Soviet Union, indicated that the blatnoy was well connected. It later came to indicate career criminals because they had a blatnoy, or special status, in the Russian criminal underworld. The word is used to indicate association with the criminal underworld (e.g. "blatnoy language"/Fenya, "blatnoy behavior", "blatnoy outlook").

== See also ==
- Compadrazgo – a similar phenomenon in Latin America
- Second economy of the Soviet Union
- Guanxi – a similar phenomenon in China
- Sociolismo – a similar phenomenon in Communist-run Cuba
- System D – a more or less similar concept of informality from European French
- Reciprocity – generalized concept used by anthropologists
- Social capital
- Cronyism
- Nepotism
- Old boy network
- The Blonde Around the Corner – a Soviet 1984 film, which illustrates the concept
- You to Me, Me to You – a Soviet 1976 film, which illustrates the concept
- Blatnaya pesnya – "criminals' song", Russian musical genre influenced by the criminal underworld
- Sistema (Russian politics)
