= Alena Ledeneva =

British sociologist (born 1964)

Alena V. Ledeneva
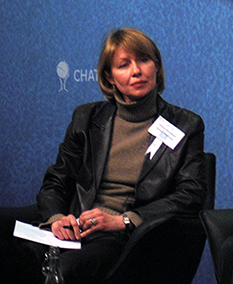
- Ledeneva in 2013
- Born: 1964 (age 61–62); Novosibirsk, Russia
- Known for: Study of blat, systemic corruption, and informal practices in Russia
- Scientific career
- Fields: Sociology
- Workplaces: UCL School of Slavonic and East European Studies
- Website: https://www.ucl.ac.uk/ssees/people/alena-ledeneva

Alena Valeryevna Ledeneva (Russian: Алёна Валерьевна Леденёва; born May 1964) is a British academic known for her studies of corruption and informal practices in Russia, particularly blat. She is Professor of Politics and Society at the School of Slavonic and East European Studies (SSEES), University College London (UCL).

== Career ==
Ledeneva studied economics at the Novosibirsk State University (1986) and social and political theory at the University of Cambridge (Newnham College, M.Phil.1992; Ph.D.1996). She was Postdoctoral Research Fellow at New Hall College, Cambridge (1996–1999); Senior Fellow at the Davis Center, Harvard University (2005); Simon Professor at the University of Manchester (2006), Visiting professor at Sciences Po, Paris (2010) and visiting professor at the Institute of Advanced Studies, Paris (2013–2014). Ledeneva has led the UCL pillar in the large-scale research project funded by the European Commission's Seventh Framework Program – Anticorruption Policies Revisited: Global Trends and European Responses to the Challenge of Corruption (ANTICORRP) (2012–2017).

== Research ==
Ledeneva's research of informal practices started with blat – the use of personal networks for getting things done in Russia (Ledeneva 1998). It has helped solve a double puzzle in the history of authoritarian regimes: how people survived in an economy of shortage, and how the regime survived under similar constraint. It also opened an avenue to explore the nature of political and economic regimes from a new perspective – the perspective of informal practices. Informal practices have become an important indicator in assessing models of governance.

In How Russia Really Works (2006) she has identified the informal practices that have replaced blat in the functioning of the political and economic institutions of the 1990s. This book has been translated into Chinese and Korean.

Arguing that such practices constitute important indicators in assessing models of government, the third volume in the trilogy, Can Russia Modernise: Putin's System, Power Networks and Informal Governance (2013), focuses on the role of clientele networks in informal governance, an emerging supra-national concern, and on the demands that network-based governance systems make on political leaderships.

These monographs (Cambridge 1998; Cornell 2006; Cambridge 2013) constitute a trilogy on Russia that explores workings of informal networks in the Soviet times (grassroots networks), post-Soviet transition of the 1990s (professional networks) and in contemporary Russia (power networks).

The interdisciplinary study of informality has been relevant for studying social capital, consumption, labour markets, entrepreneurship, trust, mobility and migration, shortages, barter, survival strategies, alternative currencies, the shadow economy, redistribution and remittance economies, and democracy (demonstrable in citation index). All these developments illustrate efforts to re-integrate social dimensions into studies of politics and economy and have policy implications.

Ledeneva's research into systemic corruption in Russian politics – has received coverage in relation to Russian interference with other nations' politics, especially with the 2016 U.S. presidential election.

In 2018, she published the Global Encyclopaedia of Informality (UCL Press, 2018), an ambitious two volume work containing the work of over 200 contributors on the subject of informality; and the third volume in 2024. All volumes are available to download for free.

== Art ==
The first solo exhibition – "The System Made Me Do It" – took place in 2024.

== Selected publications ==
- Russia's Economy of Favours (Cambridge University Press, 1998)
- How Russia Really Works (Cornell University Press, 2006)
- Can Russia Modernise? Sistema, Power Networks and Informal Governance (Cambridge University Press, 2013)
- The Global Encyclopaedia of Informality, Volume 1 (Open access) (UCL Press, 2018)
- The Global Encyclopaedia of Informality, Volume 2 (Open access) (UCL Press, 2018)
- The Global Encyclopaedia of Informality, Volume 3 (Open access) (UCL Press, 2024)
- Russian Pendulum. Paradoxes, practices and patterns (Open access) (UCL Press, 2026) - Shortlisted for the Pushkin House Book Prize 2026
