= Nightline (student service) =

Overnight student support service

- Established: 1970; 56 years ago
- Founder: Malcolm Norris France
- Founded at: University of Essex
- Type: Charity
- Purpose: Student support
- Location: United Kingdom
- Services: Confidential and anonymous overnight student service
- Website: nightline.ac.uk

Nightline is the name given to various confidential and anonymous overnight listening, emotional support, information, and supplies services, run by students for students at universities all over the world. Individual Nightlines in the UK are autonomous organisations, but are affiliated with the Nightline Association, an umbrella organisation founded to facilitate cooperation between Nightlines and enable good practices.

There are now Nightline services in around 30 universities with around 2000 student volunteers in the UK, all of which are affiliated with the Nightline Association. In later years, other universities in Europe, Canada and the United States also started Nightline services, though these are not regulated through the UK-based Nightline Association.

Their current motto is 'We'll listen, not lecture'.

== History ==
The first Nightline was set up in 1970 at Essex University by a former director of the local Samaritans branch and the university chaplain, Malcolm Norris France, to try to reduce the rate of student suicide. The helpline was founded on the understanding that some students would be reluctant to approach outsiders for help and would find it easier to speak to another student. The idea caught on and spread first to Imperial College in London in 1971, and then to many other universities around the United Kingdom.

During the early 1980s, individual Nightlines started to work together to share skills and ideas, such as publicity, recruitment and training concepts. Starting at this time, annual national Nightline conferences were held at a range of higher education venues. The umbrella organisation National Nightline was founded in 1991 as a formal structure for this work, and represents all affiliated organisations. It became a registered charity in early 2006, and soon after developed an accreditation structure around good practices for Nightlines to adhere to. It subsequently adopted the operating name of Nightline Association, and in 2012 changed the name at Companies House to formally become the Nightline Association. All Nightlines must regularly pass good practice checks from the Association in order to carry the Nightline status.

The Nightline Association hosts an annual conference of member Nightlines every year. Conferences form a primary method of communication within the Nightline Association, as a means of disseminating vital information and ideas – examples include Lancaster Nightline's conference on training issues (2006), the Oxford Nightline conferences on abusive callers (2005, 2006, 2007) and the Durham Nightline conference on changes to the suicide policy (2016).

Nightline's 40th birthday celebratory conference and awards ceremony was held at the place of its origin Essex University in March 2010. The conference and awards ceremonies are now facilitated by the Nightline Association at external venues.

On 5 February 2025, Nightline Association announced it would cease operating on 30 June 2025. The Association cited challenges with funding, and volunteering as reasons for closure. Individual Nightlines will remain functional, without the assistance of the umbrella association.

== Philosophy and vision ==
All Nightlines adhere to core principles of anonymity, confidentiality, and non-directionality. At all Nightlines, these are summarized as the 'Five Principles':

- Confidentiality – calls are strictly confidential between Nightline and the caller.
- Anonymity – callers are not required to give any identifying details to the Nightline volunteers taking their calls. Volunteers must also keep their work secret where possible, which often involves not revealing to their peers that they are Nightline volunteers.
- Non-Judgemental – Nightline will not impose any views or prejudices on callers.
- Non-Directive – Nightline will not push callers towards any course of action, but will try to help them come to their own decisions.
- Non-Advisory – Nightline does not give out advice, but will pass on factual, impartial information if appropriate.

The Nightline Association also state that their vision is for every student in higher and further education to have access to the support offered by Nightline services so that:

- Every student is able to talk about their feelings in a safe, non-judgemental environment.
- Fewer students have their education compromised by emotional difficulties.
- Fewer students die by suicide.

To achieve this vision, the mission of the Nightline Association is to raise the quality, profile, availability and accessibility of Nightline services so that every student is aware of and has access to confidential emotional peer support and the opportunity to volunteer for a Nightline.

== Services and structure ==
All Nightlines operate a telephone listening service. Many Nightlines offer e-listening (contact by email) as an additional means of support. Most recently, some Nightlines have begun offering a confidential online listening service, a confidential instant messaging one-to-one chat conducted via a secure internet connection.

In addition to the various listening services, some Nightlines supply condoms, pregnancy testing kits, personal attack alarms and women's sanitary products. A small number of Nightlines also offer SMS services.

Nightlines are staffed by student volunteers, who are trained to take calls in accordance with the principles and policies of their organisation. Nightline volunteers are not paid for their time, a few Nightlines have paid co-ordinators.
