= Automotive industry in China =

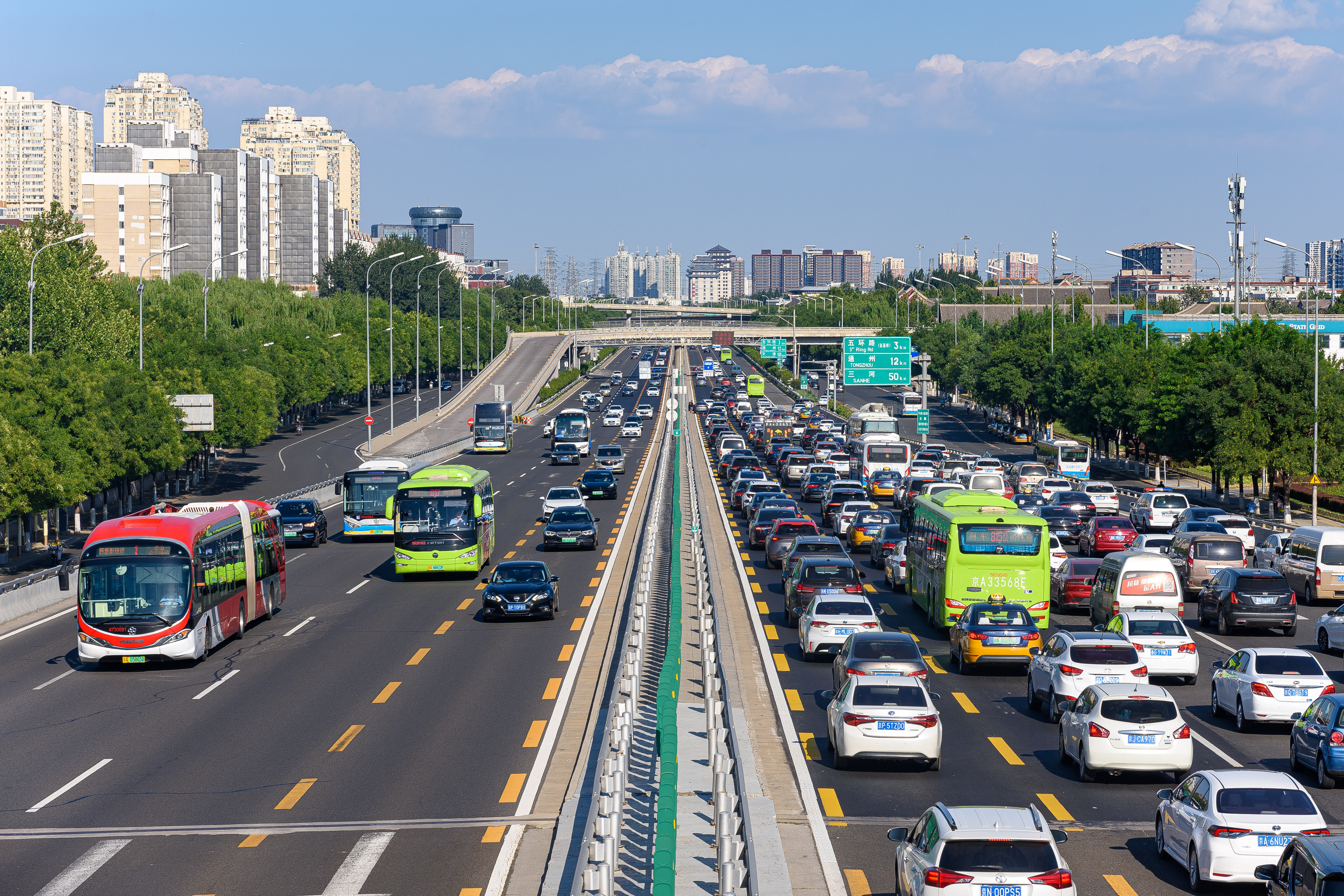
Vehicle traffic in an expressway in Beijing

The automotive industry in China has been the largest in the world measured by automobile unit production since 2008. As of 2024, China is also the world's largest automobile market both in terms of sales and ownership.

The Chinese automotive industry has seen significant developments and transformations over the years. While the period from 1949 to 1980 witnessed slow progress in the industry due to restricted competition and political instability during the Cultural Revolution, the landscape started to shift during the reform and opening up period that started in the late 1970s, especially after the government's seventh five-year plan between 1986 and 1990 prioritized the domestic automobile manufacturing sector. The entry of China into the World Trade Organization (WTO) in 2001 further accelerated the growth of the automotive industry. Tariff reductions and increased competition led to a surge in car sales, with China becoming the largest auto producer globally in 2008. Foreign investment and joint ventures played a crucial role in attracting foreign technology and capital into China. American Motors Corporation (AMC) and Volkswagen were among the early entrants, signing long-term contracts to produce vehicles in China. This led to the gradual localization of automotive components, and the strengthening of key local players such as SAIC, FAW, Dongfeng, and Changan, collectively known as the "Big Four". Strategic initiatives and industrial policy such as Made in China 2025 specifically prioritized electric vehicle manufacturing.

In the 2020s, the automotive industry in mainland China has experienced a rise in market dominance by domestic manufacturers and a shrinking market share for foreign car brands, with a growing focus on areas such as electric vehicle technology and advanced assisted driving systems. The domestic market size, technology, and supply chains have also led foreign carmakers to seek further partnerships with Chinese manufacturers. Due to rapid advancements by Chinese companies, China's automotive industry is regarded as one of the most competitive and innovative in the world. In 2023, China overtook Japan and became the world largest car exporter. In 2025, Chinese automobile companies overtook Japanese companies in global vehicle sales to become the world's largest sellers of vehicles. In 2025, China exported 7.1 million vehicles. The industry also faced heightened scrutiny, increased tariffs and other restrictions from other countries and trade blocs, especially in the area of electric vehicles due to allegations of significant state subsidies and Chinese industrial overcapacity.

== History ==
The first automobile in China was purchased from Hong Kong in 1902 by Yuan Shikai and gifted to Empress Dowager Cixi. It was later put on display in the Summer Palace Museum. During the early twentieth century, major western automobile manufacturers such as the Ford Motor Company, General Motors, and Mercedes-Benz had plants operating in Shanghai.

However, the Second Sino-Japanese War hampered the progress of the Chinese auto industry, as seen by the relocation of the Changan Automobile factory from Shanghai to Chongqing in the wake of the city's bombing and attack. After the foundation of the People's Republic of China (PRC) in 1949, plants and licensed auto design were established in China with assistance from the Soviet Union in the 1950s, marking the beginning of the country's automobile sector. However, the Chinese automotive industry did not exceed 100–200 thousand automobiles produced per year during the first 30 years of the PRC.

China's annual automobile production capacity first exceeded one million in 1992. By 2000, China was producing over two million vehicles. After China's entry into the World Trade Organization (WTO) in 2001, the development of the automobile market accelerated further. Between 2002 and 2007, China's national automobile market grew by an average 21 percent, or one million vehicles year-on-year. In 2009, China produced 13.79 million automobiles, of which 8 million were passenger cars and 3.41 million were commercial vehicles and surpassed the United States as the world's largest automobile producer by volume. In 2010, both sales and production topped 18 million units, with 13.76 million passenger cars delivered, in each case the largest by any nation in history. In 2017, total vehicle production in China reached 28.879 million, accounting for 30.19% of global automotive production. In the first half of 2023, China overtook Japan to become the world's largest exporter of automobiles, exporting 2.34 million vehicles compared to 2.02 million for Japan. In 2025, Chinese automobile companies overtook Japanese companies in global vehicle sales to become the largest sellers of vehicles worldwide; Japan had maintained its leadership for over two decades.

As of 2024, China is the world's largest market both in terms of automobile sales and ownership.

=== Early industrialization (1928–1949) ===
The first Chinese-built motor vehicle was a truck called the Minsheng 75 truck (民生牌75). It was designed by Daniel F Myers, and a prototype was made at the Liao Ning Trench Mortar Arsenal, Shenyang. The prototype was completed on May 31, 1931, for Zhang Xueliang. Prior to production commencing, the factory was bombed during the Japanese invasion of Manchuria and production never commenced. A fellow general, Yang Hucheng, patronized the inventor Tang Zhongming to make a new type of automobile engine powered by charcoal. In 1932 Tang founded the Chung Ming Machinery Co. Ltd. in Shanghai to produce the engines. Charcoal-powered vehicles were mainly used during the Second Sino-Japanese War because of fuel shortages. Tung oil was also used during the war as a petroleum substitute. The number of automobiles in China had been growing steadily which was close to 70,000 vehicles in 1937. However, due to the war, car ownership volume plummeted to 16,000 in 1940, which was only 23.8% of 1937. It was not until 1947 that car ownership volume returned to pre-war levels.

=== After the establishment of the People's Republic of China (1949–1980) ===
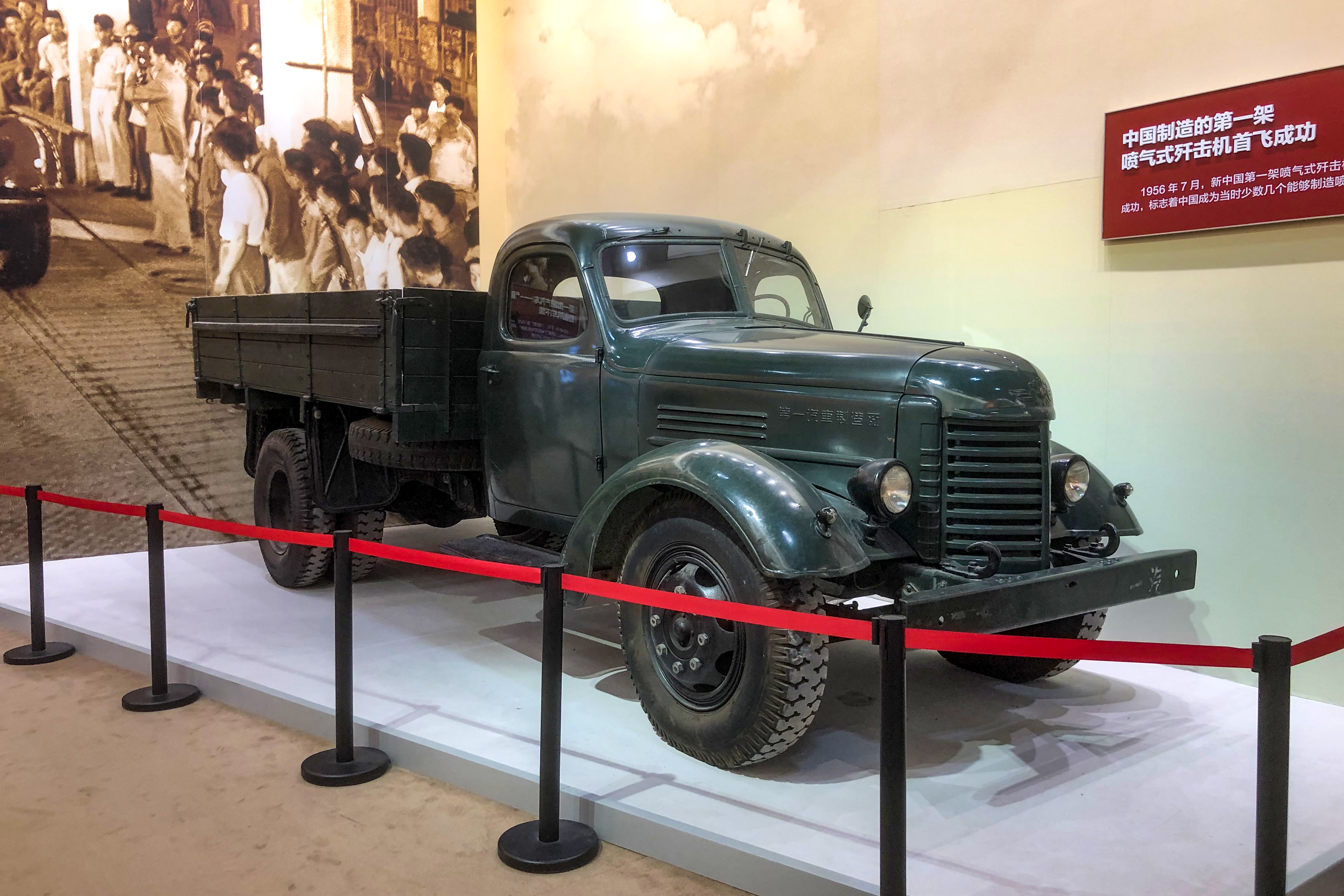
Jiefang CA10, the first production vehicle of China, made by the First Automotive Works in 1956

The development of the Chinese automobile industry following the Chinese Communist Revolution was relatively slow due to the lack of free market competition and the turbulence of the Culture Revolution. Except for a degree of development in the 1950s with assistance from the Soviet Union, the Chinese automobile industry remained closed and lagging behind until the period of reform and opening up under Deng Xiaoping. Most domestically produced vehicles were primarily the Jiefang trucks for military or industrial departments and the Hongqi sedans used by a limited number of government officials. The concept of private cars had not yet emerged in China during this period.

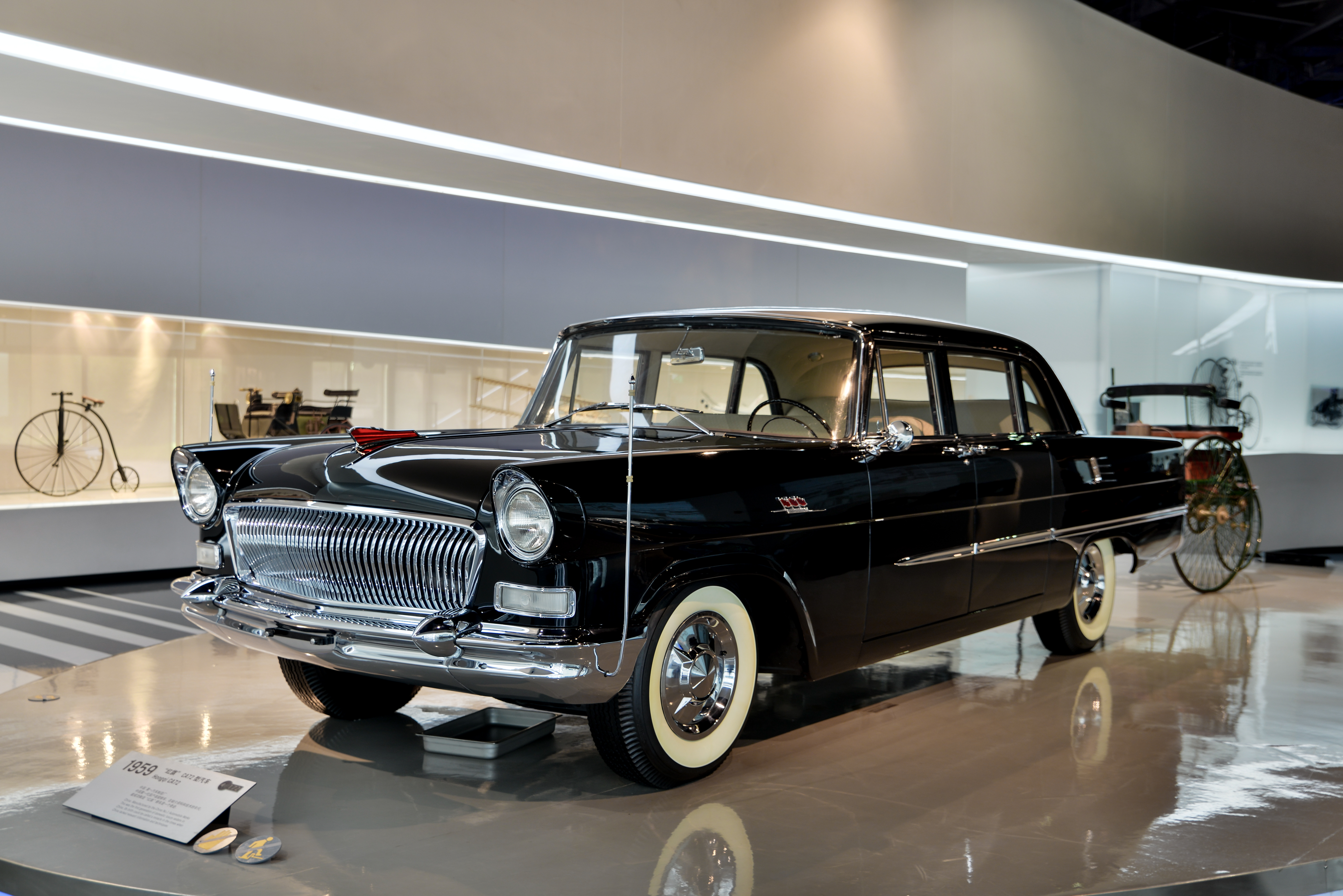
Hongqi CA72 (1959)

Several vehicle assembly factories were set up in the 1950s and 1960s. They were Beijing (today's Beijing Automotive Industry Holding Corporation), Shanghai (today's Shanghai Automotive Industry Corporation), Nanjing (later Nanjing Automobile, merged with SAIC), and Jinan (evolving into China National Heavy Duty Truck Group). The Second Automobile Works (later Dongfeng Motor Corporation) was founded in 1968.

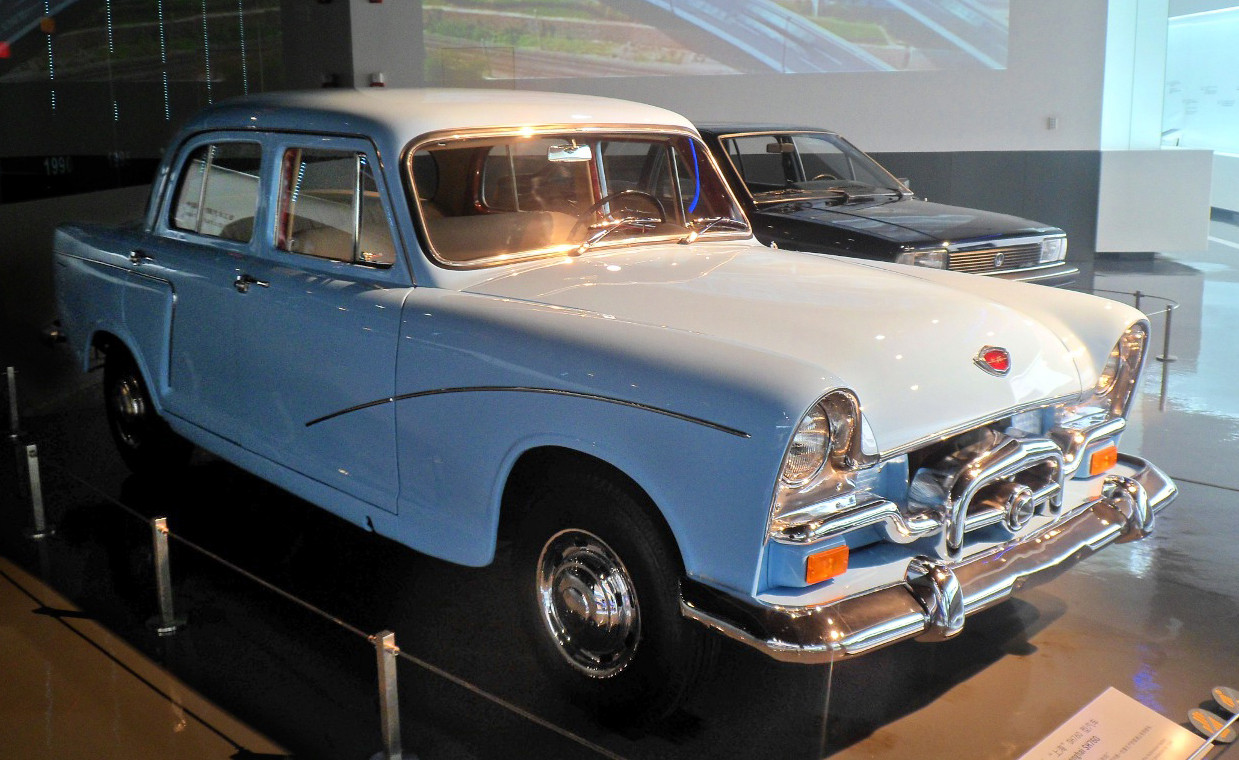
Shanghai SH760

The first Chinese production vehicles were trucks made by the First Automotive Works in 1956, called the Jiefang CA-10. This was followed on March 10, 1958, by the 2½ ton light duty truck (NJ130), which was based on the Russian GAZ-51, was produced in Nanjing. The truck was named Yuejin (meaning "leap forward") by China's First Ministry of Industrial Machinery.

In June 1958, the Nanjing Automobile, previously a vehicle servicing unit of the People's Liberation Army, began making China's first domestically produced light-duty trucks. Production continued until the last truck (NJ134) rolled off the assembly line on July 9, 1987. Cumulative production was 161,988 units (including models NJ130, NJ230, NJ135, and NJ134). The first production automobiles were the Dongfeng CA71, Hongqi CA72, Feng Huang (later known as the Shanghai SH760) all from 1958.

Changan Automobile traces its origins back to 1862 when Li Hongzhang set up a military supply factory, the Shanghai Foreign Gun Bureau. It was not until 1959 when the factory was repurposed to manufacture Changjiang Type 46 jeep that it became an automobile manufacturer.

=== Economic reform (1980–2000) ===
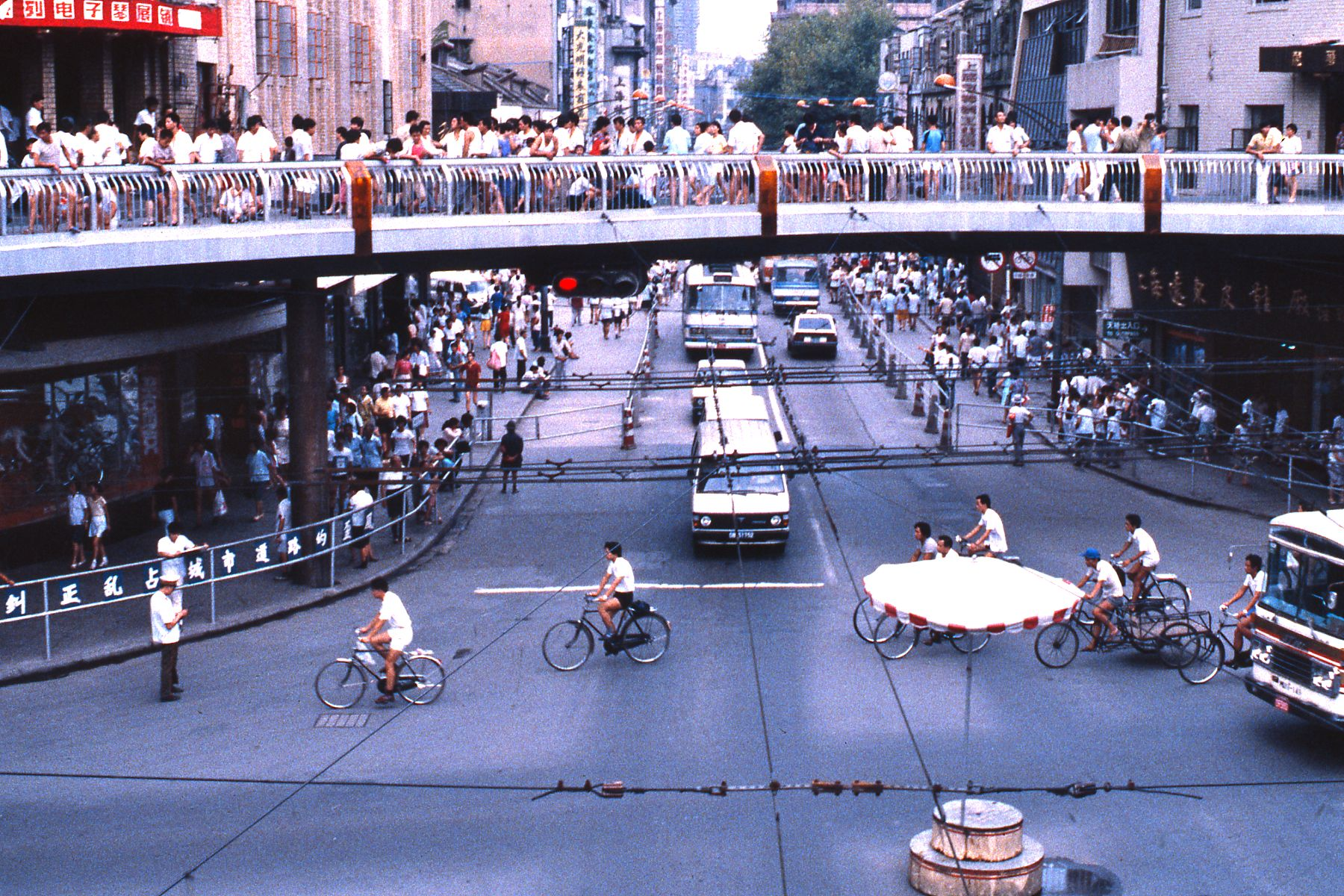
A street intersection in China in 1987, dominated by bicycles and non-private motor vehicles (buses and taxis)

The passenger car industry was a minor part of vehicle production during the first three decades of the People's Republic of China. As late as 1985, the country produced a total of only 5,200 cars. Cars were almost entirely purchased by danweis (work units – private car ownership was virtually unknown at the time, in spite of the Sun Guiying story).

==== Impact of foreign cars ====
As domestic production was very limited, import totals rose dramatically despite a 260 percent import duty on foreign vehicles. Before 1984, the dominant exporter of cars to China had been the Soviet Union. In 1984, Japan's vehicle exports to China increased sevenfold (from 10,800 to 85,000), and by mid-1985, China had become Japan's second biggest export market after the U.S. The country spent some $3 billion to import more than 350,000 vehicles (including 106,000 cars and 111,000 trucks) in 1985 alone. Three taxi companies in particular imported many Japanese cars such as Toyota Crowns and Nissan Bluebirds.

As this spending binge began to lead to a severe trade deficit, the Chinese leadership put on the brakes through the adjustment of import and foreign exchange policies. Customs duties on imported goods were raised in March 1985, and a new "regulatory tax" was added a little later. In September 1985, a two-year moratorium on nearly all vehicle imports was imposed.

==== Joint ventures ====
In July 1979, China adopted its first Law on Joint Venture Using Chinese and Foreign Investment. This law was effective in helping to attract and absorb foreign technology and capital from developed countries like the United States, facilitating China's exports to such countries and thereby contributing to China's subsequent rapid economic growth.

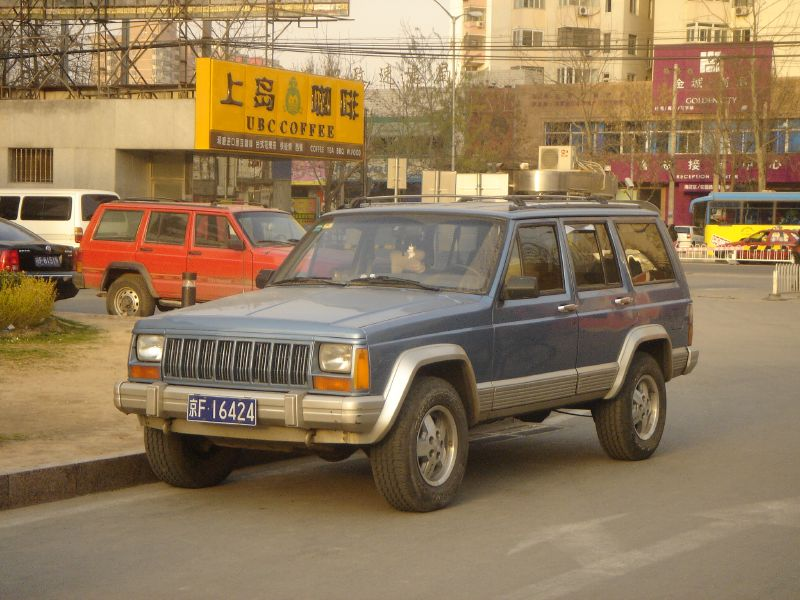
Jeep Cherokee, made by first joint venture of China, Beijing Jeep.

While limiting imports, China also tried to increase local production by boosting the various existing joint venture passenger car production agreements, as well as adding new ones. In 1983, American Motors Corporation (AMC, later acquired by Chrysler Corporation) signed a 20-year contract to produce their Jeep-model vehicles in Beijing. The following year, Germany's Volkswagen signed a 25-year contract to make passenger cars in Shanghai, and France's Peugeot agreed to another passenger car project to make vehicles in the prosperous southern city of Guangzhou. These early joint ventures did not allow the Chinese to borrow much foreign technology, as knock-down kit assembly made up the majority of manufacturing activities; tooling may not have been allowed to slip past borders.

Until the late 1990s, there were eight joint venture enterprises in China producing passenger cars, including Shanghai Volkswagen, FAW-Volkswagen, Beijing Jeep, Guangzhou Peugeot, Dongfeng Citroën, Changan Suzuki, Changhe Suzuki, and Soueast Motor.

==== The Seventh Five-Year Plan and supply chain localization efforts ====
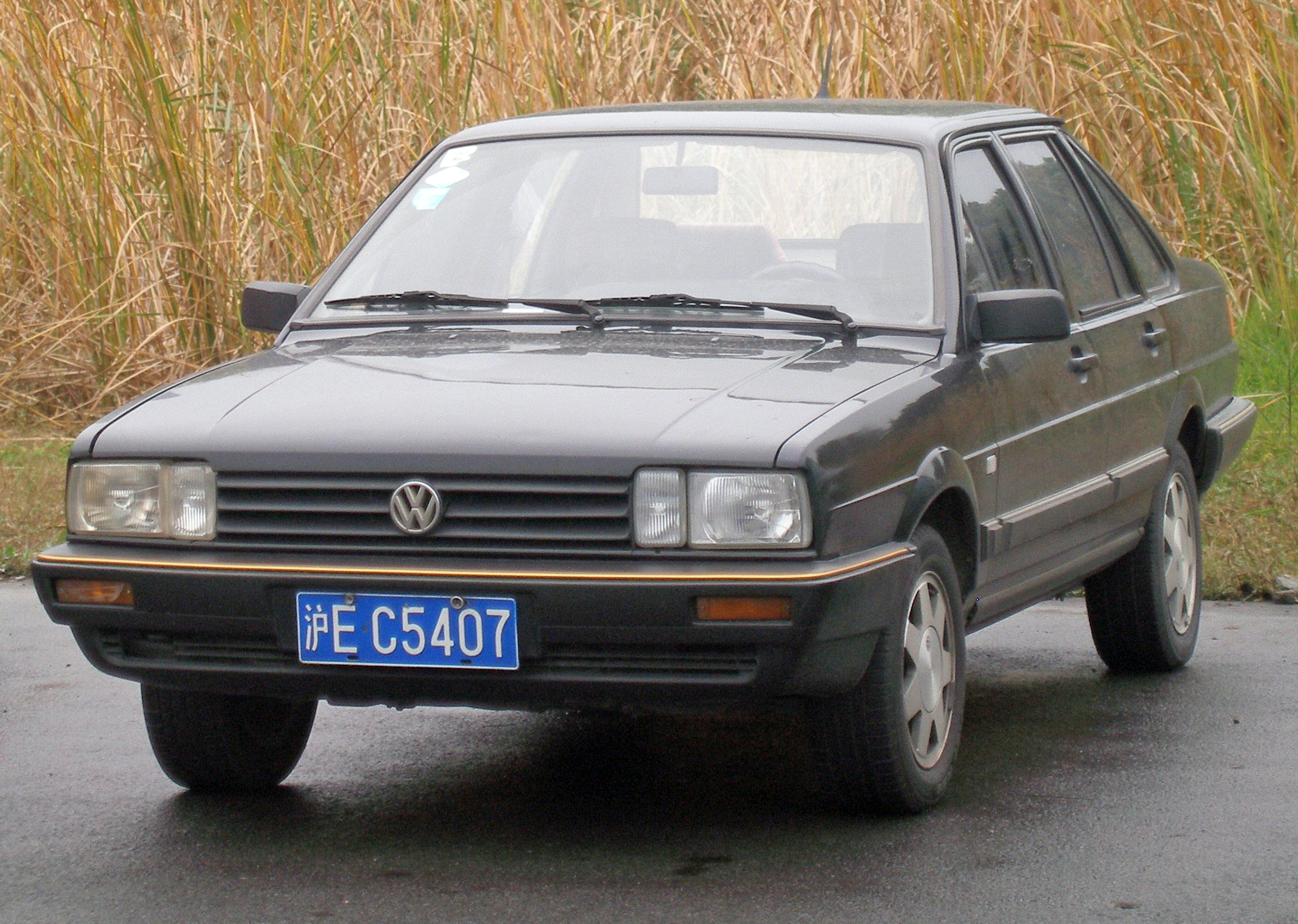
Volkswagen Santana, made by SAIC-VW, once was the most popular family sedan from the 1990s to 2010s.

In April 1986, the Chinese government's seventh five-year plan, which recognized automobile manufacturing as a "pillar industry". The Chinese automotive industry gradually moved away from the manual workshop model and adopted Western advanced technologies and quality control management. Over the course of a decade, the localization rate of Chinese automotive components significantly increased. In 1997, the localization rate of the SAIC-VW Santana, one of the most popular sedans in China at that time, jumped from 60.09% six years prior to over 90%, with key components like the car body, engine, transmission, and front and rear axle assemblies all achieving localization. The localization rate of the FAW-VW Audi 100 reached 93%, while the Jetta achieved an 84.02%. The localization rate of the Citroën Fukang by FAW exceeded 80%. The improvement in the localization rates of complete vehicles were made possible by the growing capabilities of complementary enterprises in the industry chain. During this period, diesel engines from Yuchai Machinery Factory and automotive glass from Fuyao began to emerge.

Several enterprises entered the automobile industry beginning in 1994. Some of them are originated from the defense industry, such as Changan, Changhe, and Hafei; some were developed from state-owned companies, such as BYD, Brilliance, Chery, and Changfeng Motor. Others are private-owned companies, such as Geely Auto and Great Wall Motor.

=== Growth and expansion (2000–2020) ===
==== World Trade Organization admission ====
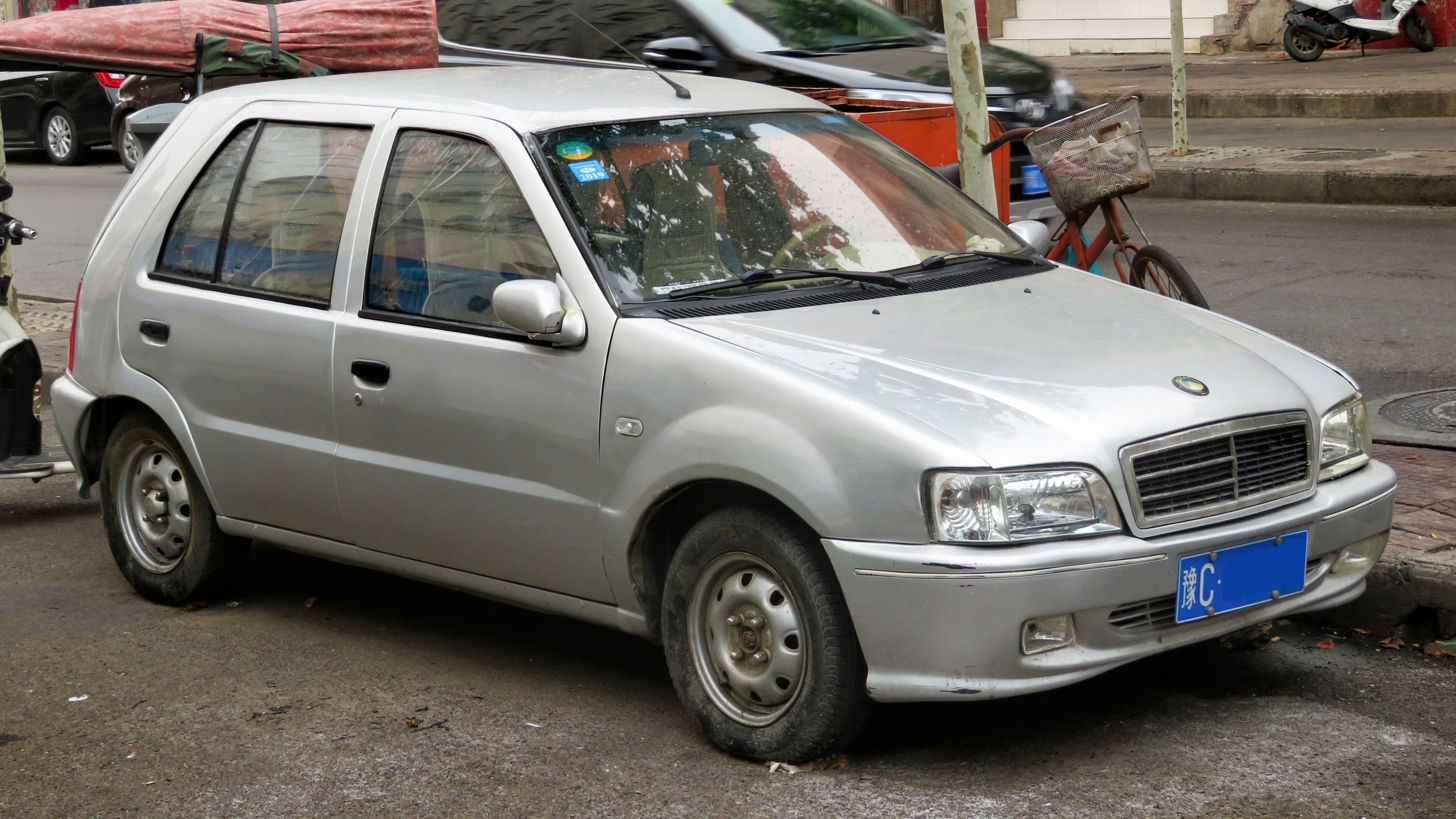
Geely Haoqing, first vehicle produced by Chinese private manufacturer Geely in 1998.

China entered the World Trade Organization in 2001, marking a significant shift in the country's automotive industry. Following the admission, automotive tariffs began to be substantially reduced, leading to a decrease in the prices of imported cars. This reduction in tariffs transformed the market. As foreign automotive companies started bringing their latest models into China, Chinese consumers gained access to a wider variety of vehicles at more competitive prices, driving increased demand and competition within the industry.

By following WTO regulations, starting in 2006, the import tariffs on complete vehicles in China were lowered from the previous 30% to 28%. In 2010, they were further reduced to 25%. Tariffs on automotive components like transmissions, shock absorbers, radiators, clutches, and steering units decreased from 13.5% to 12.9% and eventually to 10%.

With China's entry into the WTO, competition from both domestic and foreign automotive brands increased. This intense competition caused prices in the domestic automotive market to decline steadily. The annual average reduction in car prices has exceeded 8%, with a particularly notable decrease of 13.5% in 2004.

==== Rapid growth and intensified competition ====
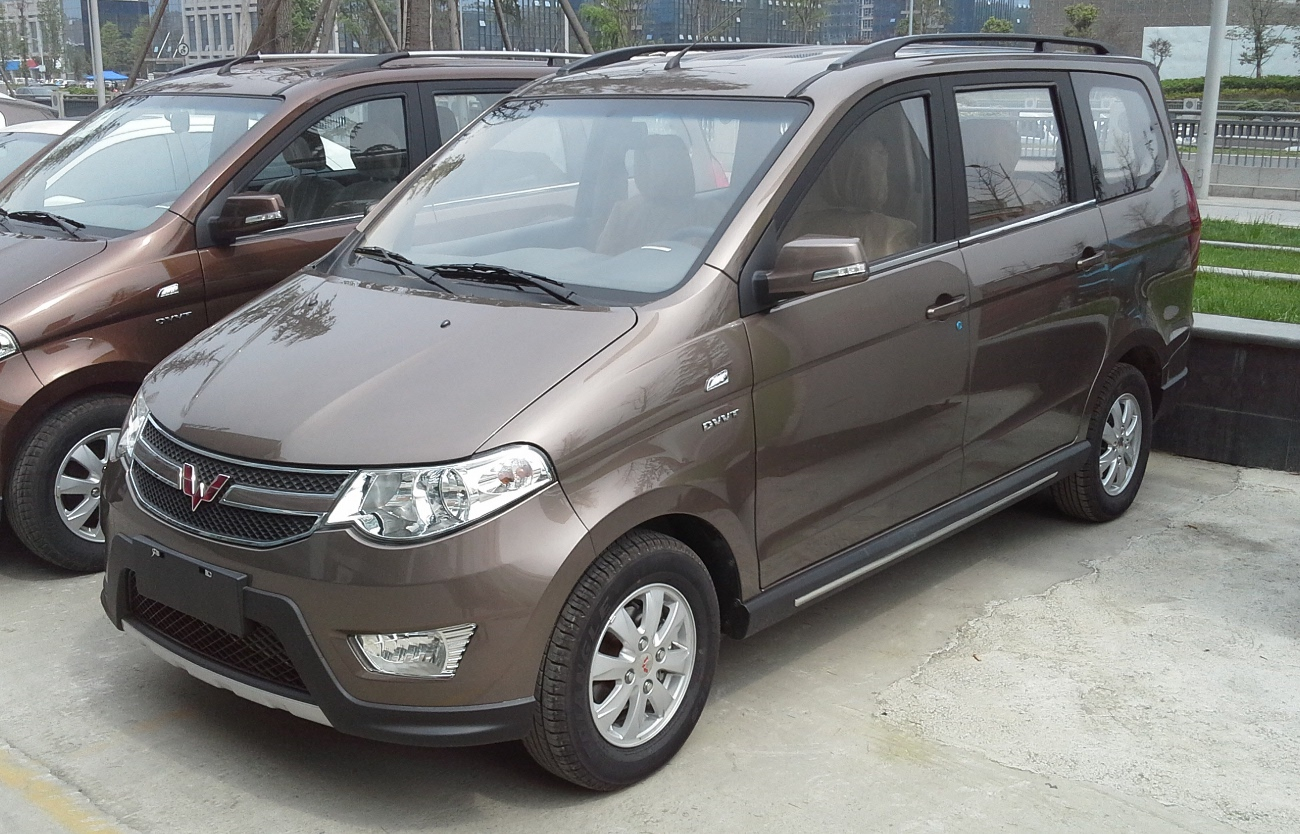
Wuling has been the most popular minivan brand during 2000–2020. Wuling Hongguang achieved a record-breaking annual sales of 750,000 in the Chinese market in 2014.

The Chinese automotive market experienced significant growth after 2000. This growth is closely tied to China's economic development and the rise of the middle class. An increasing number of Chinese households can afford cars, leading to a surge in sales. China's automobile production grew from two million vehicles in 2000 to 29 million vehicles in 2017. During that time, its global market share rose from 3% to 30%. By 2017, there were 300.3 million registered vehicles in China.

In January 2007, China surpassed Japan to become the world's No. 2 vehicle market after the United States, with a 37 percent increase in car purchases. An estimated 7.2 million vehicles was sold in China in 2006. In 2008, China became the largest auto producer globally. Following the 2008 financial crisis, the Chinese government implemented various policies to stimulate car purchases. This included a car-scrappage scheme and sales tax reductions on smaller vehicles, leading to a surge in demand for cars with engines less than 1.6 liters. Due to these stimulus measures, growth was particularly strong over 2009 and 2010, with production and sales of automobiles doubling over this period. Both the scrappage scheme and the sales tax discount ended in late 2010. In 2010, the Chinese automotive industry became the largest in the world, surpassing the United States. Following a 59 percent year-on-year sales increase, China's car sales exceeded those of the US in 2009, with 13.6 million vehicles sold within the country compared to just over 10 million in the US. At this point, almost 200 million Chinese people were able to drive a vehicle, making up about 15 percent of the country's 1.3 billion population.

With the rapid growth of China's automobile production, China became the country with the most diverse range of automotive brands globally. Competition in China's automobile market significantly intensified during this period. However, the export market remained relatively small compared to the domestic market. In 2008, motor vehicle exports constituted about 7% of Chinese automobile production, decreasing to about 3% in 2009 due to the 2008 financial crisis. Key export destinations in 2010 included Algeria, Vietnam, Russia, Iran, and Chile. Most motor vehicle exports at that time were directed towards developing and emerging economies.

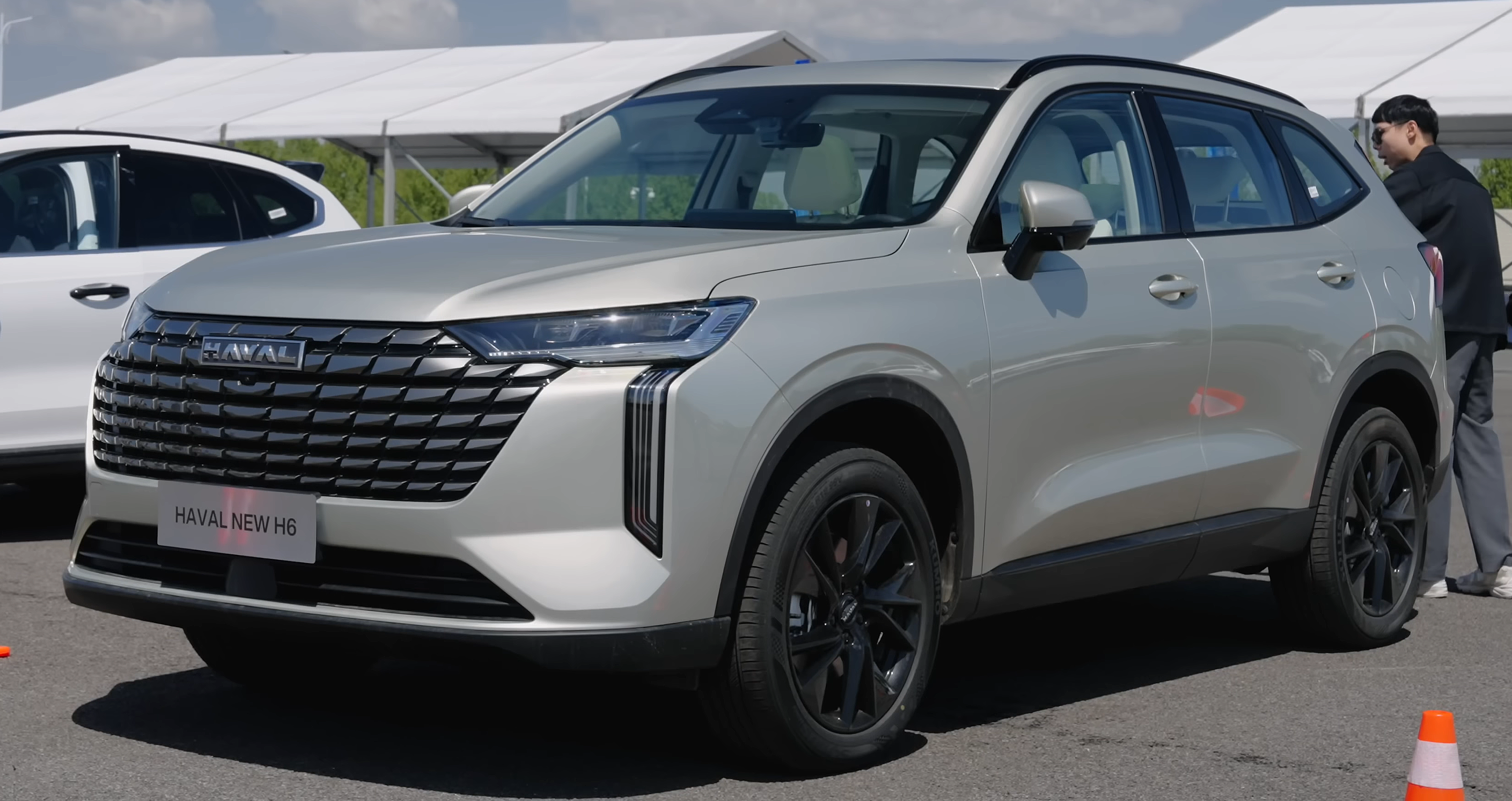
Haval H6, best-selling SUV for 100 consecutive months, still holding the highest monthly sales record of 80,000 units in Chinese market.

Apart from mainstream joint venture brands dominating the mid-to-high-end market, there was a substantial presence of local state-owned and private small and medium-sized automotive companies. However, despite the Chinese government's policy of requiring foreign carmakers to establish local joint ventures, Chinese carmakers faced difficulty to compete with foreign competitors during this era. According to the China Association of Automobile Manufacturers (CAAM), local car brands saw their market share decline, dropping from 30.9 percent in 2010 to 26.8 percent by the end of July 2012. Experts attribute this lack of success to the joint ventures' failure to transfer know-how effectively. Former Chinese industry minister He Guangyuan likened auto manufacturing joint ventures to "opium," criticizing Chinese firms for relying on assembling foreign cars with minimal changes instead of developing vehicles from scratch to gain know-how and patent rights.

To facilitate consolidation, in 2012, the government revoked production permits for manufacturers producing fewer than 1,000 passenger vehicles annually. On February 29, 2016, the Ministry of Industry and Information Technology shut down 13 automobile manufacturers that did not meet mandatory production evaluations for two consecutive years. After 2018, an increasing number of these smaller brands became 'zombie company' state, with many suspending production and operations, as market-driven consolidation accelerated. The number of Chinese automotive brands increased from just over 20 in the early 1990s to 84 in 2019.

In 2017, China imported $51 billion of vehicles. In 2018, China lowered the vehicle import tariffs to 15%, and the vehicle components import tax to 6% to provide greater access for foreign automakers in China.

==== The "corner overtaking" strategy with new energy vehicles ====
In 2009, the State Council of the People's Republic of China issued the "Automobile Industry Adjustment and Revitalization Plan," which emphasized, "Using new energy vehicles as a breakthrough, strengthening independent innovation to establish new competitive advantages." It explicitly outlined China's plan to use electric vehicle. This strategy is commonly referred to as the "corner overtaking strategy" in the Chinese automotive industry. In 2010, China's sales of electric vehicles were only 5,000 units. By 2015, the sales had surged to 331,000 units. In 2015, the Made in China 2025 industrial policy that prioritized electric vehicles was launched. By 2020, electric vehicles sales reached 1.367 million units, accounting for more than 50% of global market share.

==== Ending joint venture restriction ====
Following the reform and opening up, from 1994 to 2018, Chinese automotive policy mandated that foreign carmakers had to establish joint ventures with a Chinese counterpart to produce vehicles in the country, with the Chinese partner owning at least 50% of the venture. This measure was implemented to protect local manufacturers and provide it with the chance to bridge the technology gap and develop their brands. In the 2010s, automotive analysts speculated China would lift its restriction on joint venture ownership once the domestic industry matures.

In 2017, the Chinese government announced the intention to lift ownership restrictions in the automotive industry and allowed foreign automotive companies to take majority or full ownership of their operations in China. On April 17, 2018, The National Development and Reform Commission (NDRC) of China announced that foreign ownership limits on automakers would be phased out over a 5-year period. The goal of the Chinese government was to open the Chinese market to foreign companies and new technologies, ease trade tension, and increase market competition.

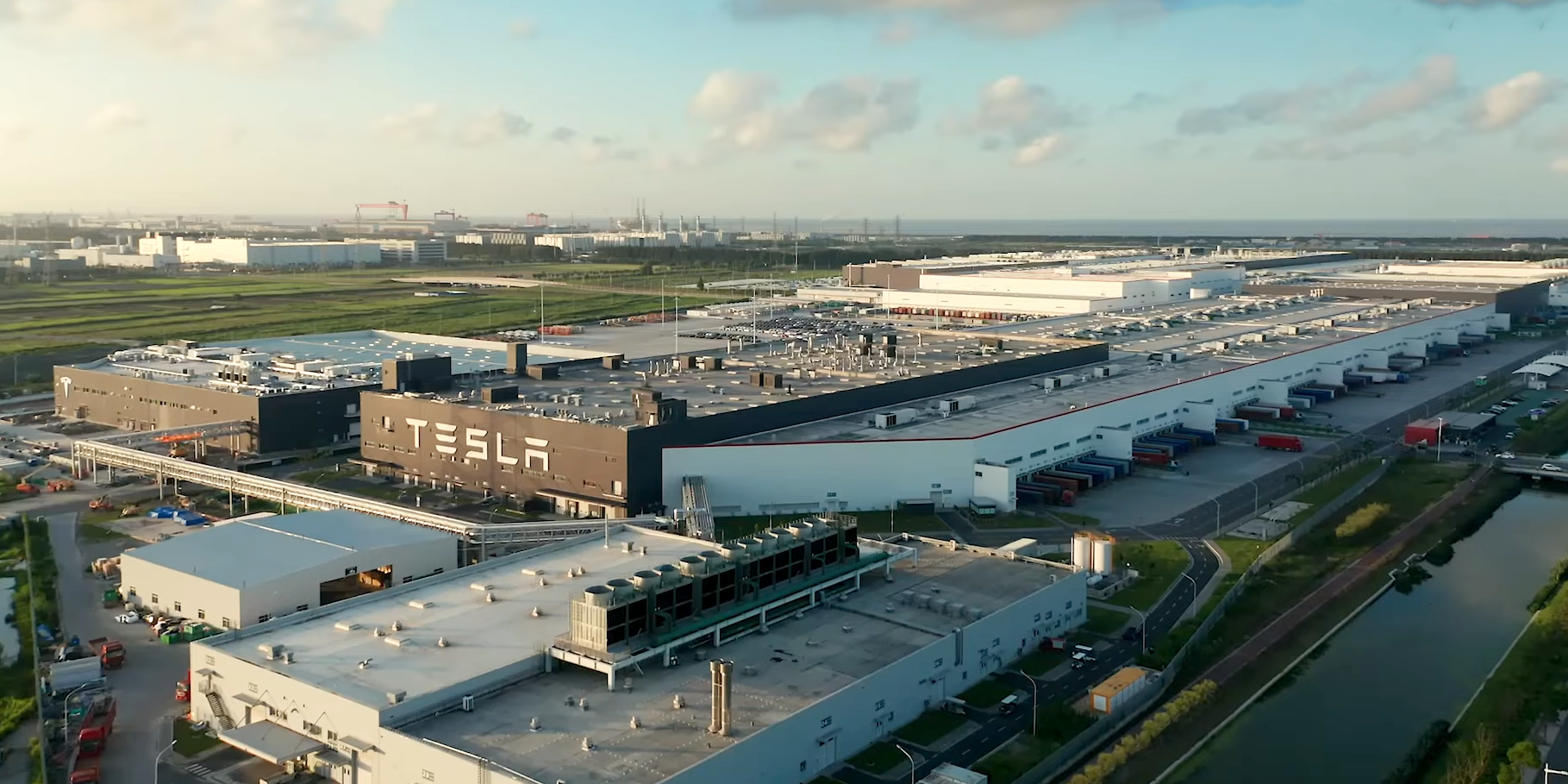
Gigafactory Shanghai, the first facility fully owned by a foreign carmaker in China

On 28 July 2018, China lifted foreign ownership restrictions on new energy vehicle production, which benefited American electric car manufacturer Tesla, Inc. The company established a plant in Shanghai, becoming the first foreign automaker to open a wholly owned manufacturing facility in China. The liberalization was followed by commercial vehicles in 2020 and passenger cars in 2022. The regulation preventing foreign automakers from forming more than two joint ventures in China was also lifted in 2022. In December 2020, Volkswagen gained majority control of its Chinese electric car joint venture JAC-VW, controlling 75% of its Chinese business operation and renamed it to Volkswagen Anhui. In 2021, Volvo took complete ownership control of its Chinese manufacturing and sales subsidiaries. In 2022, BMW took control of its Chinese joint venture, BMW Brilliance with Brilliance Auto Group, reaching 75% of the stake.

=== Maturation and global advantage (2020–present) ===
Since 2020, the Chinese automotive industry has entered a phase marked by the maturation and advancement of technology among local manufacturers. As a result, there has been a notable increase in the market share held by local manufacturers within the domestic market. Additionally, many foreign brands have sought partnerships with Chinese automakers to capitalize on their technological advancements and supply chain capabilities.

==== Increasing share of local manufacturers ====
According to the China Passenger Car Association (CPCA), in the first half of 2020, the market share of local brands in the Chinese automotive market was slightly more than 30 percent, with German and Japanese brands then at around 30 percent and 25 percent respectively. Two years later, in October 2022, the share of local car brands in China reached 51.53 percent. It was the first time in history that the monthly share of local car brands in China exceeded 50 percent. In contrast, the dominance of foreign brands are rapidly declining. The share of German brands fell to 19.25 percent, and Japanese brands fell to 18.94 percent in October 2022. Throughout 2023, the market share of local brands has remained at around 50 percent. These changes were attributed to the rapidly increasing popularity of new energy vehicles, and the failure of foreign brands to catch up with the shift. In 2024, the market share of foreign car brands fell to a record low of 37 percent. According to a report by CPCA, the cumulative share of Chinese automobile brands in China's local market reached 61 percent for the full year 2024. In the first 11 months of 2025, the share of foreign car brands fell to another record low of around 30 percent, while domestic brand share increased to around 70 percent; the shares of German and Japanese brands had also fallen to 12 percent and 10 percent respectively.

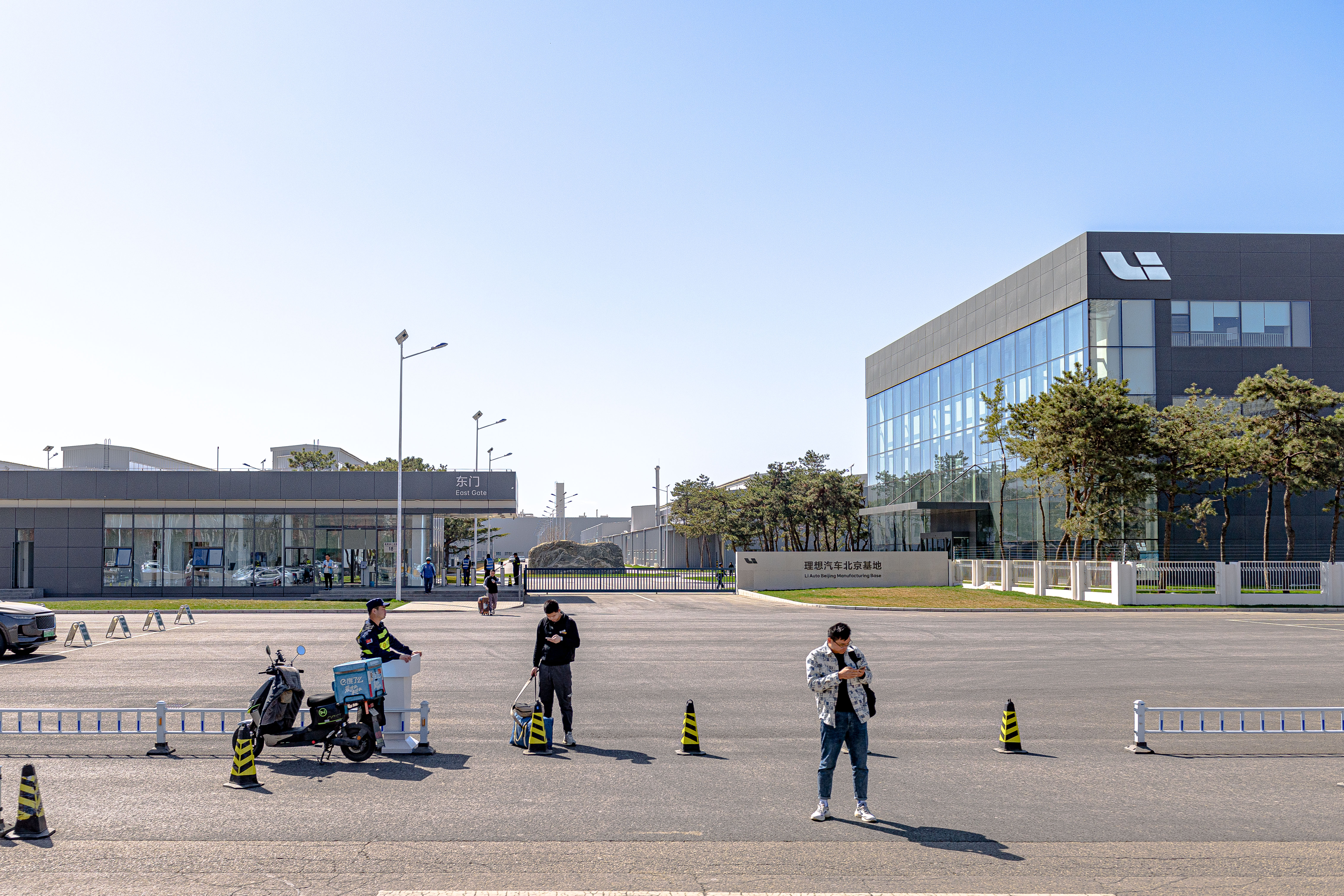
Li Auto manufacturing plant in Beijing. The company took over the plant from Beijing Hyundai, which has had decreasing sales.

Due to these market dynamics, some joint ventures that were already facing challenges during the era of traditional fuel-powered cars are further disadvantaged. In May 2023, Zhu Huarong, chairman of Changan Automobile, predicted that "in the next 2–3 years, it is conservatively estimated that 60%-70% of brands will face closure and transfer." Between 2018 and 2023, eight joint venture manufacturers opted to withdraw from the Chinese market. Other joint ventures with significantly decreased sales are scaling back their production capacity by closing and selling their underutilized manufacturing plants. The remaining production capacity has been acquired by their Chinese joint venture partners.

In August 2023, BYD chairman and CEO Wang Chuanfu called on local Chinese car manufacturers to "unite" to take on foreign manufacturers, responding to the severe price war in the Chinese market throughout 2023. The call was welcomed by the CEOs of Nio and Li Auto.

==== Price war (2022–present) ====
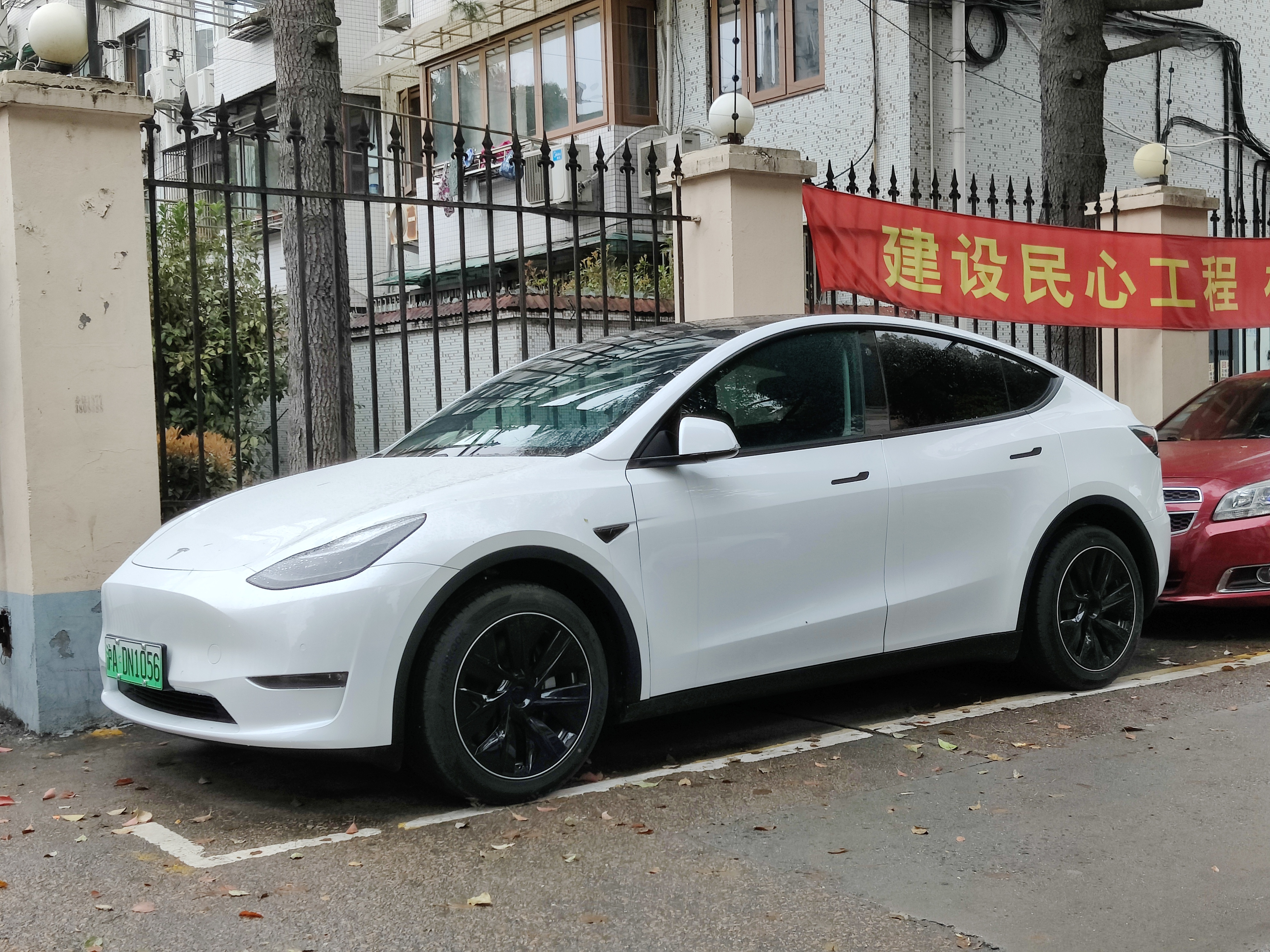
A Tesla Model Y in China. Tesla initiated the Chinese market price war in late 2022.

Since late 2022, the Chinese automotive industry has experienced a significant price war characterized by aggressive price reductions by carmakers to attract customers and increase market share, amid an economic slowdown and production overcapacity. Tesla initiated the subsequent price war by offering two substantial price cuts on its Chinese-made models in October 2022 and January 2023. The situation was also caused by the fact that China's automobile industry is moving towards electrification, which led to overcapacity of internal combustion engine vehicles. In 2023, China's light vehicle production capacity was 48.7 million units, with a capacity utilization rate of 59%. By 2023, Reuters reported that over 40 carmakers in China in both internal combustion engine and electric vehicle segments followed suit to maintain their market position. Brands resorted to extreme measures by offering deep discounts and other incentives while pressing auto suppliers to reduce costs. The competitive climate also caused a heightened focus on innovation and value-added features in vehicles. However, there are concerns from analysts, journalists and executives in the industry about its long-term effects on the overall health and stability of the Chinese automotive industry.

In mid-2023, Bloomberg News reported most top Chinese automakers, except BYD and Changan, suffered a decline in profits as a result of the price war, hitting its lowest since the beginning of the COVID-19 pandemic in 2020. BYD, which specialized in electric vehicles, became an outlier as it experienced record profits and deliveries in this period, securing its position as a key player in the market. The market dynamics also drove the share of Chinese automakers to an all-time high, accounting for slightly over 50% of the market. However, the market dynamics in China also led to overcapacity, especially in EVs, which prompted Chinese carmakers to increase exports and expand sales overseas.

Declining sales and profits also affected foreign joint venture brands. In March 2023, SAIC-Volkswagen reduced prices on its ID.3 electric cars by 18 percent. Toyota implemented workforce reductions at GAC Toyota, eliminating around 1,000 jobs. Additionally, Hyundai sold two of its plants, while Mitsubishi Motors left the market completely in that year. Layoffs were also observed at GAC Honda, Volkswagen, Volvo, Tesla, and Kia.

The Chinese government has attempted to mitigate the negative impacts of the price war through various measures, such as subsidies for electric vehicle purchases and initiatives to promote the adoption of new energy vehicles in rural areas. In July 2023, sixteen manufacturers, including fifteen Chinese carmakers and Tesla, signed an agreement facilitated by the China Association of Automobile Manufacturers (CAAM) to avoid "abnormal pricing" practices and prevent a price war. However, just two days later, CAAM retracted the "abnormal pricing" clause due to concerns about violating China's antitrust laws. This move quickly ended the temporary "peace" and triggered another round of price cuts. In June 2025, the People's Daily stated a price war among the country's automotive manufacturers would have "no winners," harmed investment in research and development, and could cause safety problems.

==== Safety standard enhancements ====
In February 2026, the Chinese government proposed a set of regulations that would require that essential vehicle safety functions be controlled by physical switches or buttons. This would be in contrast to a trend among some manufacturers to include these functions in their infotainment systems, or use capacitive buttons instead, both of which have had negative safety feedback from many road users. China's Ministry of Industry and Information Technology said that the new regulations would mandate that functions including turn signals, hazard lights, gear selection, and emergency calling must have fixed buttons or switches, with a minimum surface size of 10mm x 10mm.

The announcement came after China became the first country in the world, earlier in February 2026, to ban concealed door handles on EVs, which had been linked to major safety issues. China's government is also codifying safety expectations for high-level driver-assistance technology. This includes a mandatory standard for Level 3 and Level 4 automated driving systems. A "safety case" requirement is also part of the proposed regulatory changes. This would require manufacturers to provide structured, documented evidence that their autonomous driving systems can handle both daily driving and critical high-risk scenarios.

Furthermore, the new standards define a "Minimal Risk Condition", requiring that if an automated system fails, or a driver ignores a takeover request, the vehicle must be capable of autonomously reaching a stable, stationary state. Finally, the new regulations also formalize remote assistance for fully-automated cars, allowing human operators to intervene in complex environments. This is an important step toward the mass commercialization of robotaxis and hands-free driving on Chinese highways.

==== "Reversed" joint ventures ====
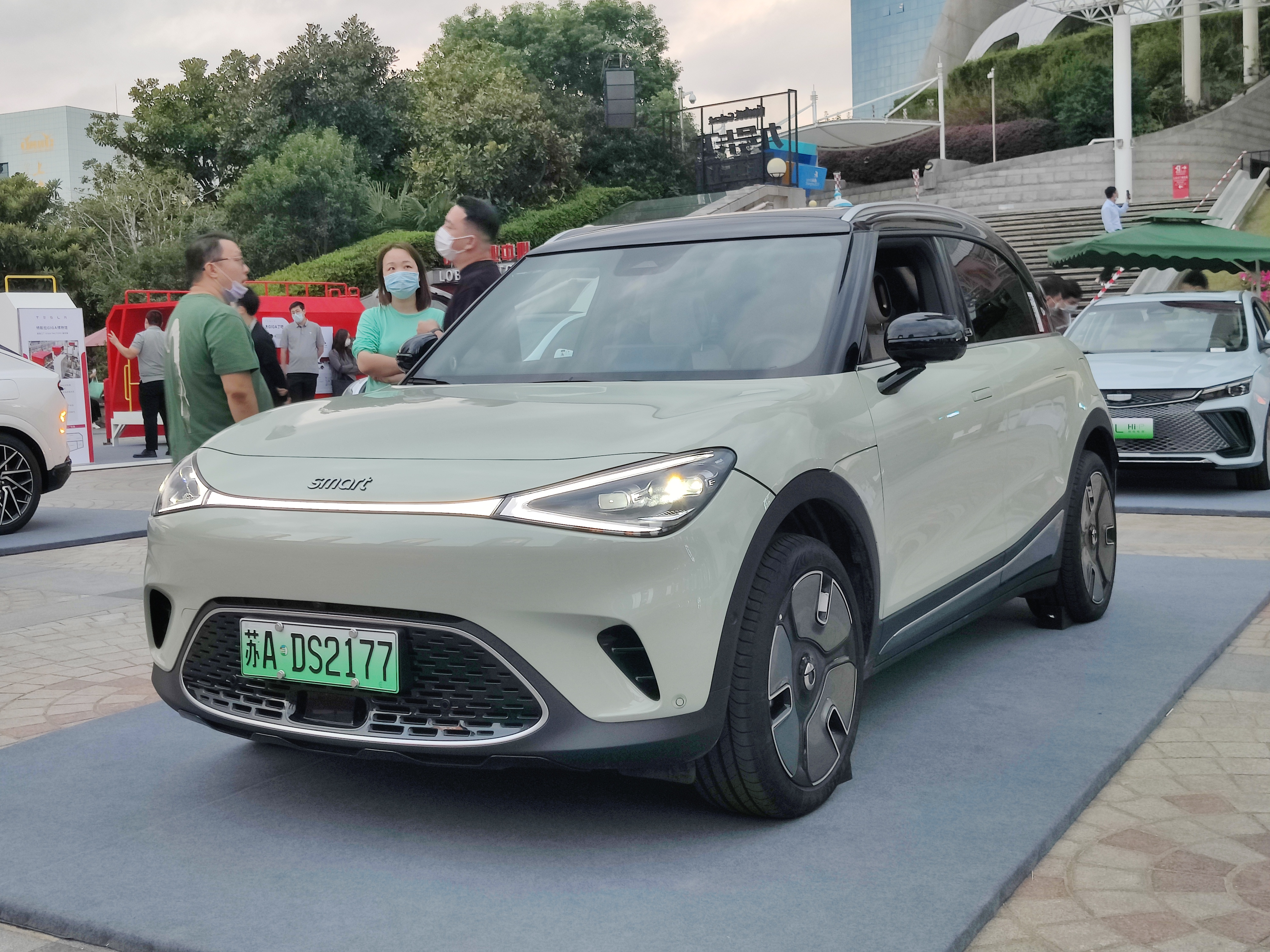
Smart #1, built by Geely's joint venture with Mercedes-Benz. It is developed based on Geely's EV technology.

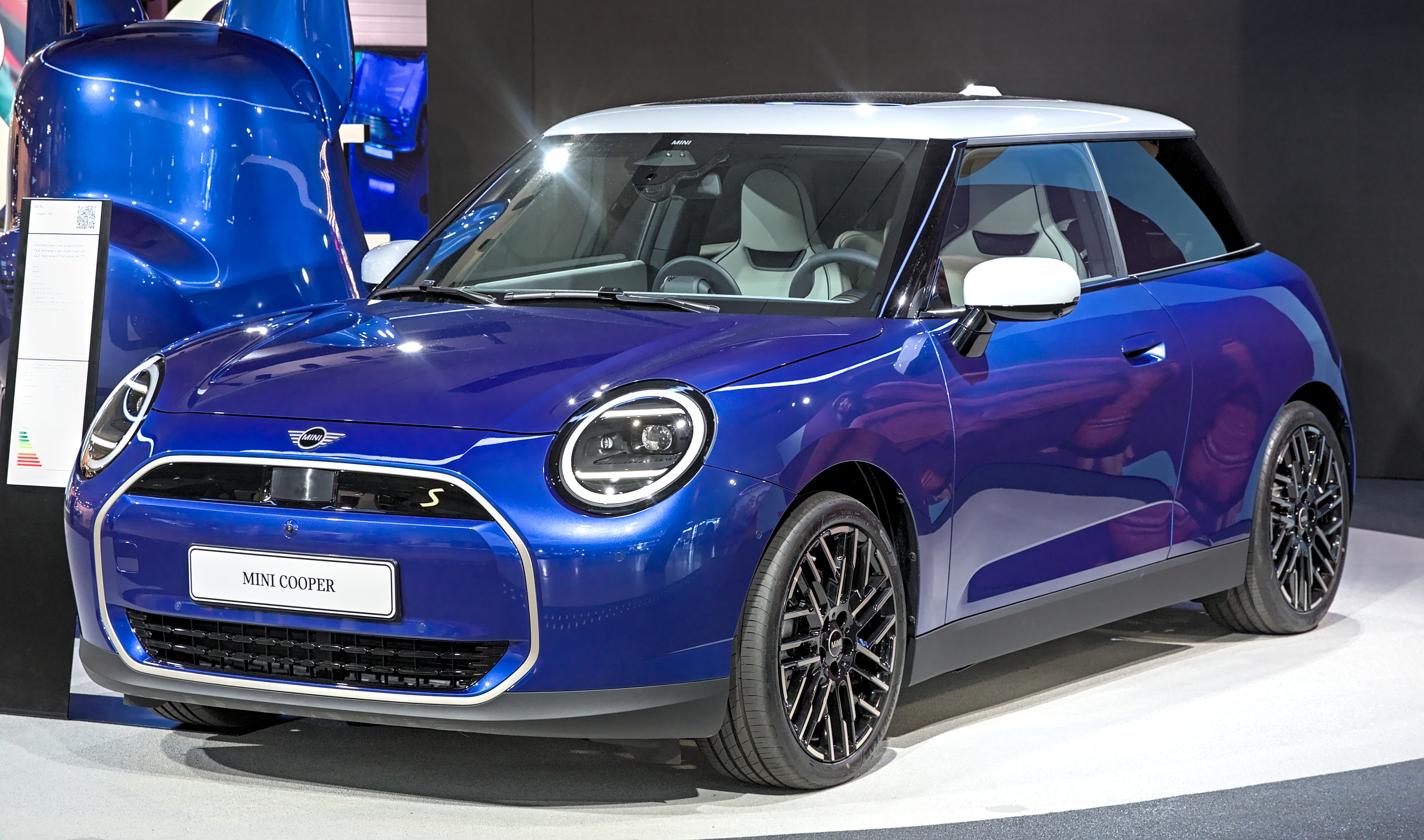
Mini Cooper SE, developed and manufactured by Spotlight Automotive, a joint venture between GWM and BMW.

In the 2020s, foreign global manufacturers started seeking technological assistance from its Chinese counterparts and invested in China through joint ventures or other forms of partnerships, including Renault, Nissan, Volkswagen Group, BMW, Mercedes-Benz, Toyota, Stellantis, and Jaguar Land Rover.

- In 2017, Renault, Nissan and Dongfeng set up a joint venture called eGT New Energy Automotive to produce A-segment EVs.
- In 2019, Mercedes-Benz announced the establishment of a joint venture with Chinese automaker Geely. Geely acquired 50% of Smart to produce EVs based on Geely's SEA platform.
- In July 2019, Renault announced a capital injection of 1 billion yuan to acquire a 50% stake in JMEV, an EV subsidiary of Jiangling Motors Corporation.
- In 2020, BMW and Great Wall Motor invested RMB 5.1 billion on a 50-50 joint venture Spotlight Automotive to produce Mini EVs.
- In 2020, Toyota announced its joint venture with Chinese manufacturer BYD. The joint venture was set to assist technical know-how for Toyota's EV development and supply the battery, electric motor and electronic control unit for Toyota's EV. Toyota bZ3, the first electric sedan of Toyota, was built under the assistance of BYD.
- In July 2023, Audi and SAIC announced their partnership in developing EVs. The EV platform from SAIC's EV brand, IM Motors will be introduced into Audi's electric models.
- In July 2023, Volkswagen Group announced a $700 million investment in Chinese EV startup XPeng, acquiring a 4.99% stake. They will jointly develop two Volkswagen-branded electric mid-size models for the Chinese market in 2026.
- In August 2023, Geely and Renault set up a 50–50 joint venture, Horse Powertrain, to manufacture internal combustion engine (ICE) and hybrid powertrains for Geely, Renault, Nissan and Mitsubishi vehicles. The joint venture went operational in May 2024.
- In September 2023, Ford and Changan announced the establishment of a new joint venture Changan Ford NEV to produce and distribute Ford vehicles based on Changan's EV technology. Changan holds 70% stake in the JV while Ford holds 30%.
- In October 2023, Stellantis announced its investment to Leapmotor at the price of 1.5 billion euro, acquiring 20% of Leapmotor for the support of technology to produce EVs.
- In April 2024, Toyota introduced the bZ3X which was jointly developed with GAC Group and GAC Toyota.
- In June 2024, Jaguar Land Rover and Chery signed a letter of intent to create an EV brand called Freelander that will be based on an EV platform from Exeed.
- In October 2024, KG Mobility and Chery signed an agreement to co-develop electric vehicles on Chery's T2X platform for global markets.

The reversal in roles was attributed to China's domestic market competitiveness, scale of technology implementation, and a mature supply chain for electric vehicles.

==== Involvement of Chinese technology companies ====
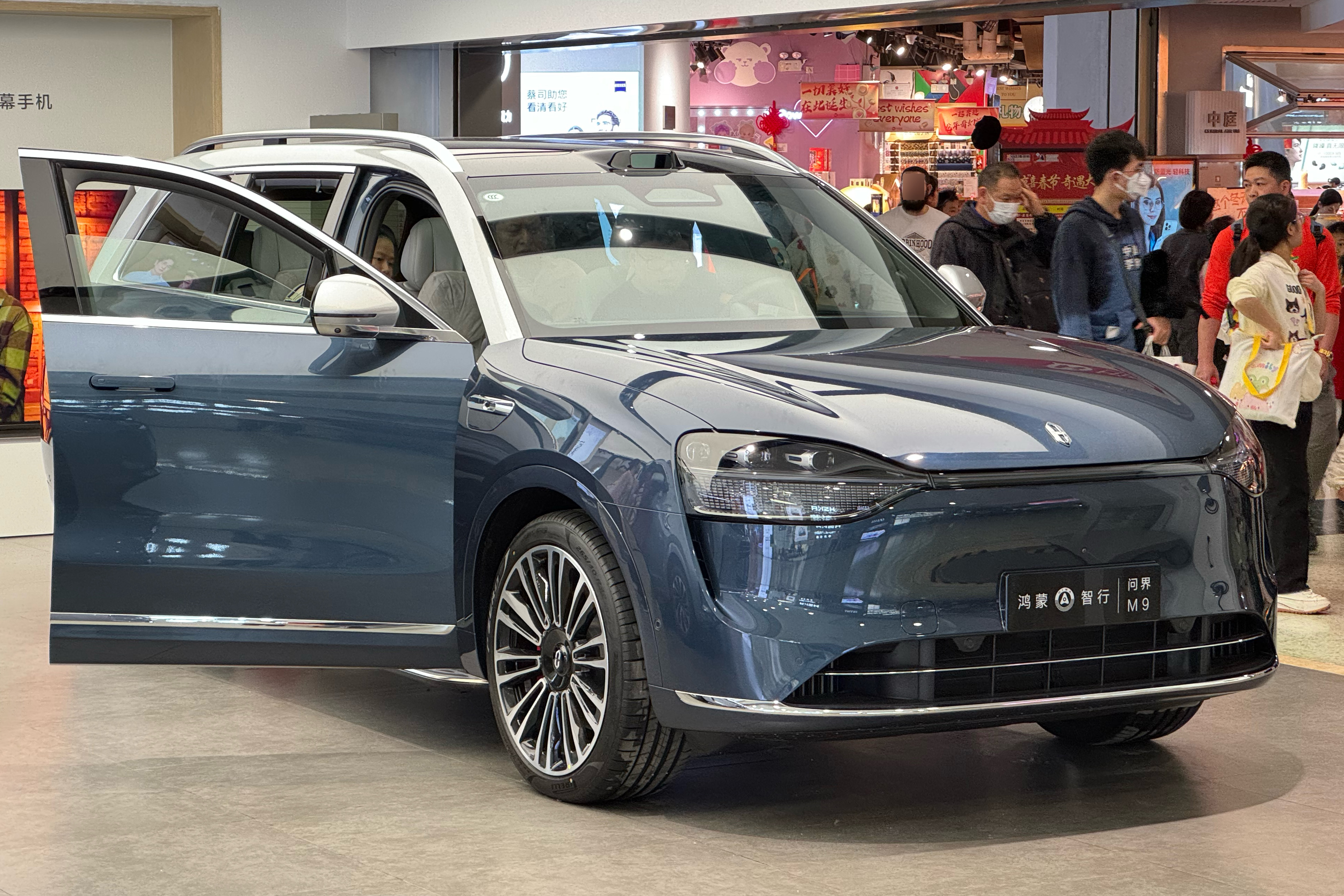
The AITO M9 is designed and supplied by Huawei's hardware and software solution and manufactured by Seres Auto and sold through Huawei/HIMA showrooms.

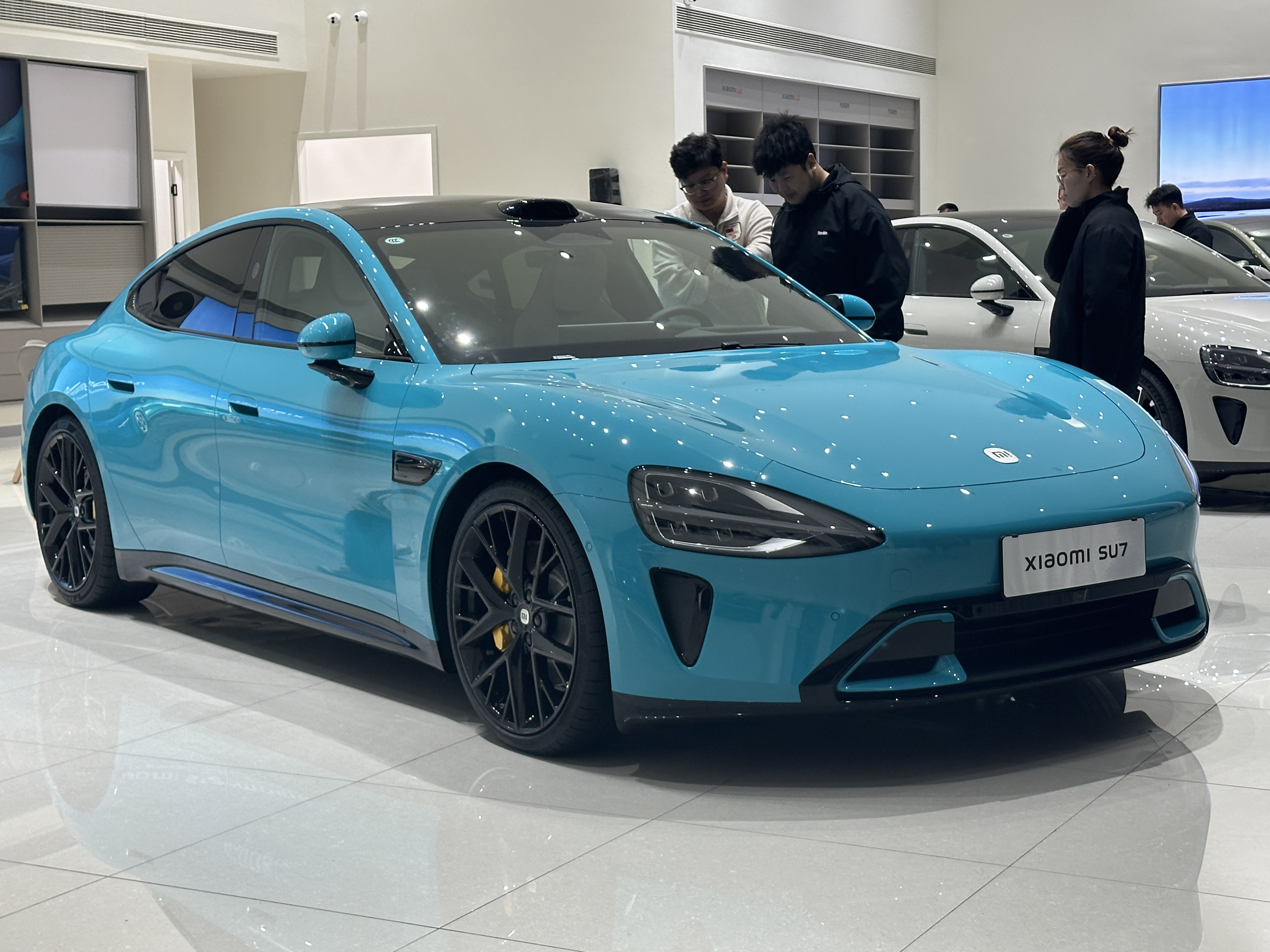
Xiaomi SU7 is first vehicle by Xiaomi.

Since the 2020s, Chinese technology corporations such as Huawei, Baidu, DJI have entered the automotive business. Huawei's partnership with automobile manufacturers has taken the form of three business models, the standardized parts supply model, the "Huawei Inside" (HI) model, and the Harmony Intelligent Mobility Alliance (HIMA). Baidu and DJI have provided autonomous driving system and hardware to automotive manufacturers. Qihoo 360 invested in the Chinese EV startup company Hozon Auto. Geely collaborates with Baidu to set up joint venture brands, and acquired Chinese smartphone company Meizu for its Polestar and Lynk & Co brands with its auto OS and AR system. Oppo collaborates with SAIC Motor on the infotainment system used for MG EVs. Xiaomi is the first and the only Chinese tech company that is directly involved in automotive design, development and manufacturing, and operates its factory in Beijing.

== Supply chain ==
In terms of electric vehicle production, China has a significant advantage over other countries. The Chinese automotive industry holds a dominant position in the electric vehicle supply chain, with more than 600,000 EV-related enterprises operating in the country as of 2022. Chinese manufacturers' share of the global EV battery market stood at 60% in 2022. Industry analyst Chris Berry stated that China has a 10 to 15-year head start on the rest of the world in terms of EV battery supply chain.

The dominance of the EV battery supply chain is considered a major factor contributing to the lower cost of Chinese EVs. Some 75 percent of the world's lithium-ion batteries are made in China, and the country's EV manufacturing facilities are close to the source of these components. China has invested heavily in refinery capacity, housing more than half of the world's processing and refining capacity for lithium, cobalt, and graphite, which are essential materials for making EV batteries. 70 percent of the global production capacity for cathodes and 85 percent for anodes are also hosted in China.

China's strength in EV supply chain resulted in reduced costs in logistics, labor, and land management. Additionally, economies of scale are enabled by its large domestic EV market. China's EV manufacturing sector enjoys a cost advantage of 20 percent compared to Western markets such as those in the U.S. and Europe. In January 2023, according to an executive of French automotive supplier Forvia, Chinese carmakers can build an electric vehicle (EV) for €10,000 less than European carmakers, an overwhelming cost advantage that will put pressure on European manufacturers in their home market. Chinese manufacturers are able to produce electric vehicles at lower cost by having lower research and development costs, lower levels of capital spending, and lower labor costs than European rivals.

The entry of Tesla to the Chinese market has greatly benefited China's automotive supply chain. The company has been responsible for imposing the "catfish effect" on the Chinese EV industry, which forced Chinese manufacturers to innovate and match with Tesla from technology advancement to affordability.

== Technological innovation ==
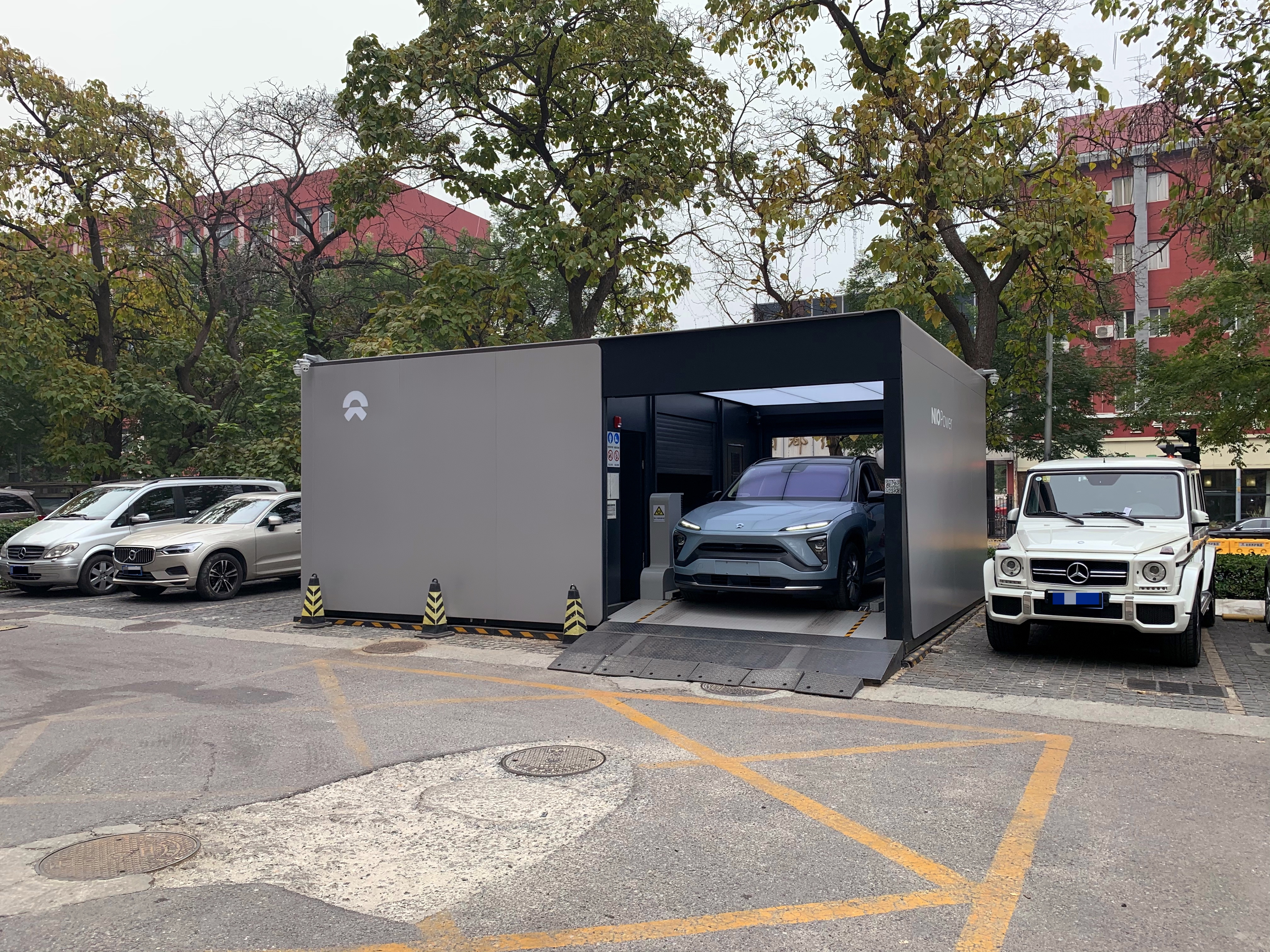
A Nio Power Battery Swap station in China. Nio pioneered the battery swapping capability.

Amidst the fierce domestic competition in China's domestic market, Chinese automakers have established the building blocks for growing competitiveness in EV technology, software, digitalization, factor cost and supply chain areas. China's domestic brands lead the market in the development and implementation of advanced assisted driving systems, capitalizing on their early-entry advantages in the electric and intelligent vehicle sector. According to The New York Times in 2025, China's automotive industry is "now widely seen as the most innovative in the world, besting the Japanese, the Germans and the Americans".

According to investment bank Goldman Sachs, newly opened Chinese car plants are the most robotized of such facilities worldwide.

== Sales and marketing ==
=== Dealerships ===
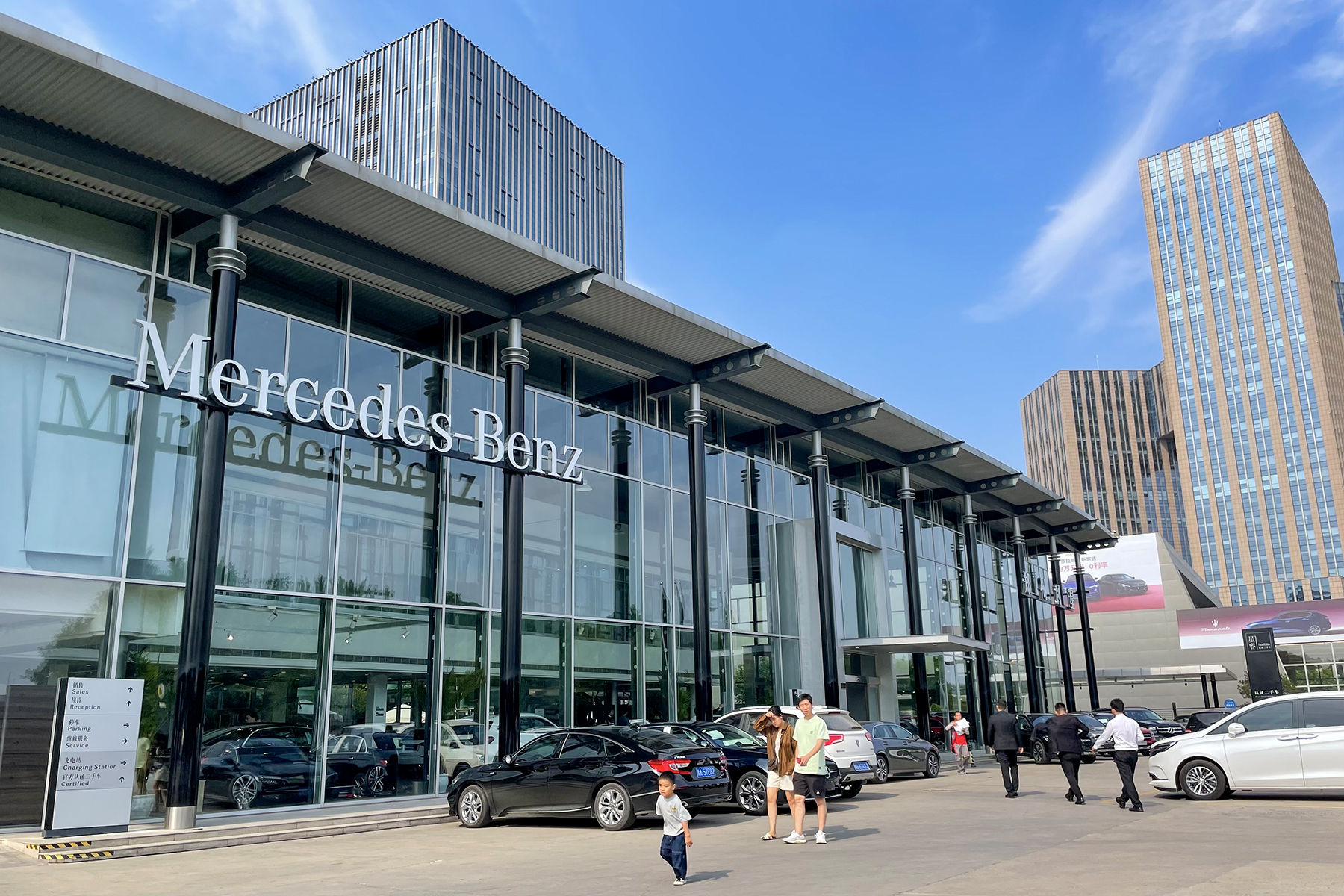
A Mercedes-Benz dealership in Zhengzhou

In China, authorized car dealerships are called 4S car shops. The 4S represents sales (整车销售), spare parts (零配件), service (售后服务) and survey (信息反馈). In most cases, brand-name new cars can only be purchased from 4S shops.

The profit of car dealerships in China is quite high compared to the rest of the world, in most cases 10%. This is supposedly due to the 'non-transparent invoice price' as announced by manufacturers and to the premiums they charge for quick delivery. Due to the lack of knowledge for most customers, dealers can sell add-ons at much higher prices than the aftermarket. For new cars in high demand, a high premium is added for instant delivery or just placing an order. There is no regulation by either the government or associations, but some retailers are members of the China Automobile Dealers Association (CADA).

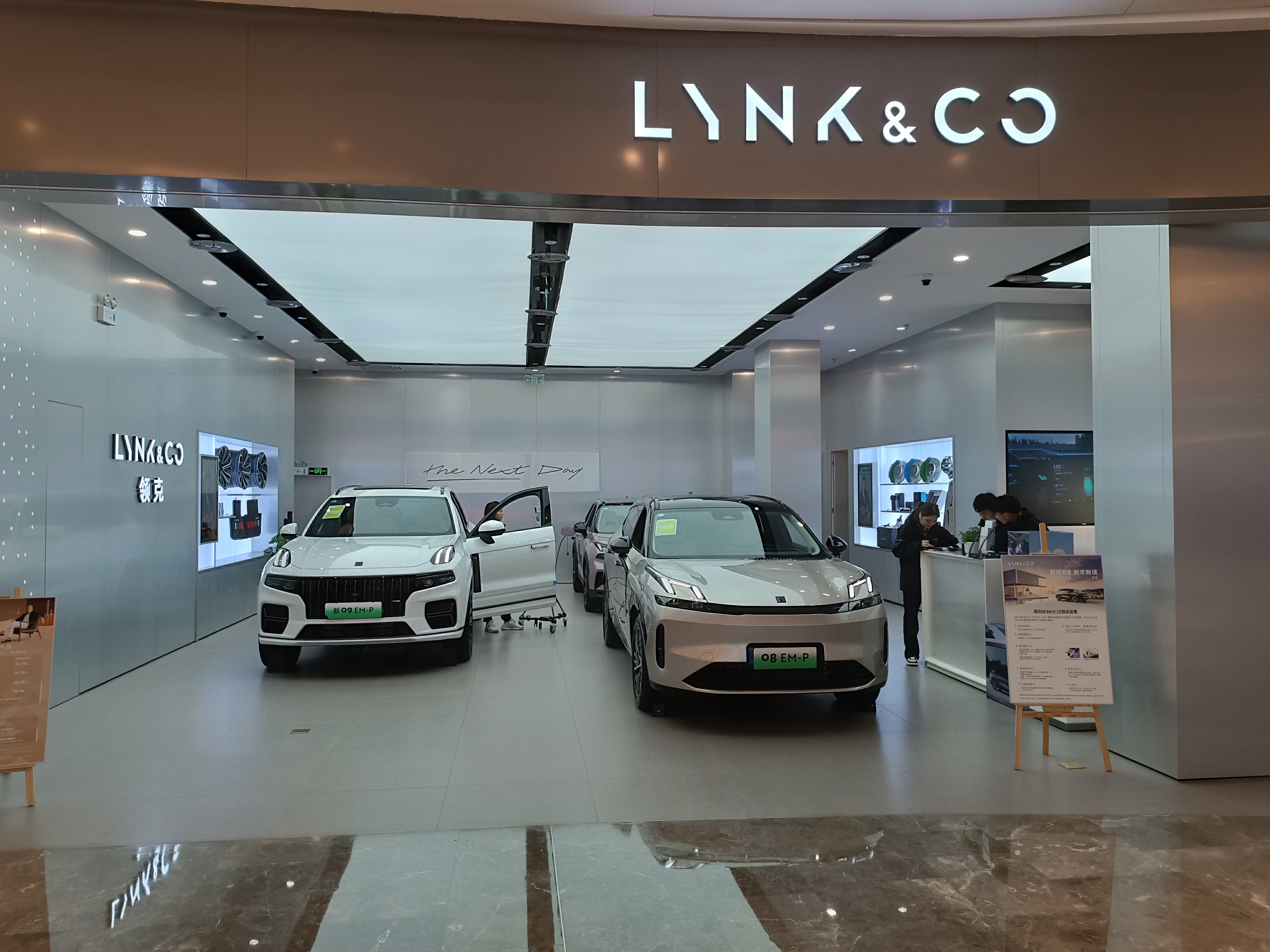
A Lynk & Co showroom in a mall in Shenzhen, selling vehicles directly to customers

Direct sales are allowed in China, and have gained popularity in the 2020s, driven by new energy vehicle brands. Many electric car brands such as Nio, XPeng and Huawei's HIMA rely heavily or solely on the direct sales model. Traditional automakers have also started adopting this sales model. This phenomenon has led to a reduction in the number of traditional dealerships.

=== Nomenclature ===
Car brand and model names in China typically include both an English name and a Chinese name chosen by the manufacturer, often sounding different or unrelated to the English name, regardless of whether they are from a foreign or domestic brand. For example, the Chinese name of Toyota, "丰田"; Fēngtián sounds different from its original name, however the same kanji characters in Japanese means "Toyota". On the other hand, Mazda chose to use an identical-sounding transliterated name, "马自达"; Mǎzìdá. Another example is AITO that has a completely unrelated Chinese name by character, sound or meaning, which is "问界"; Wènjiè, with literal meaning 'ask the world'.

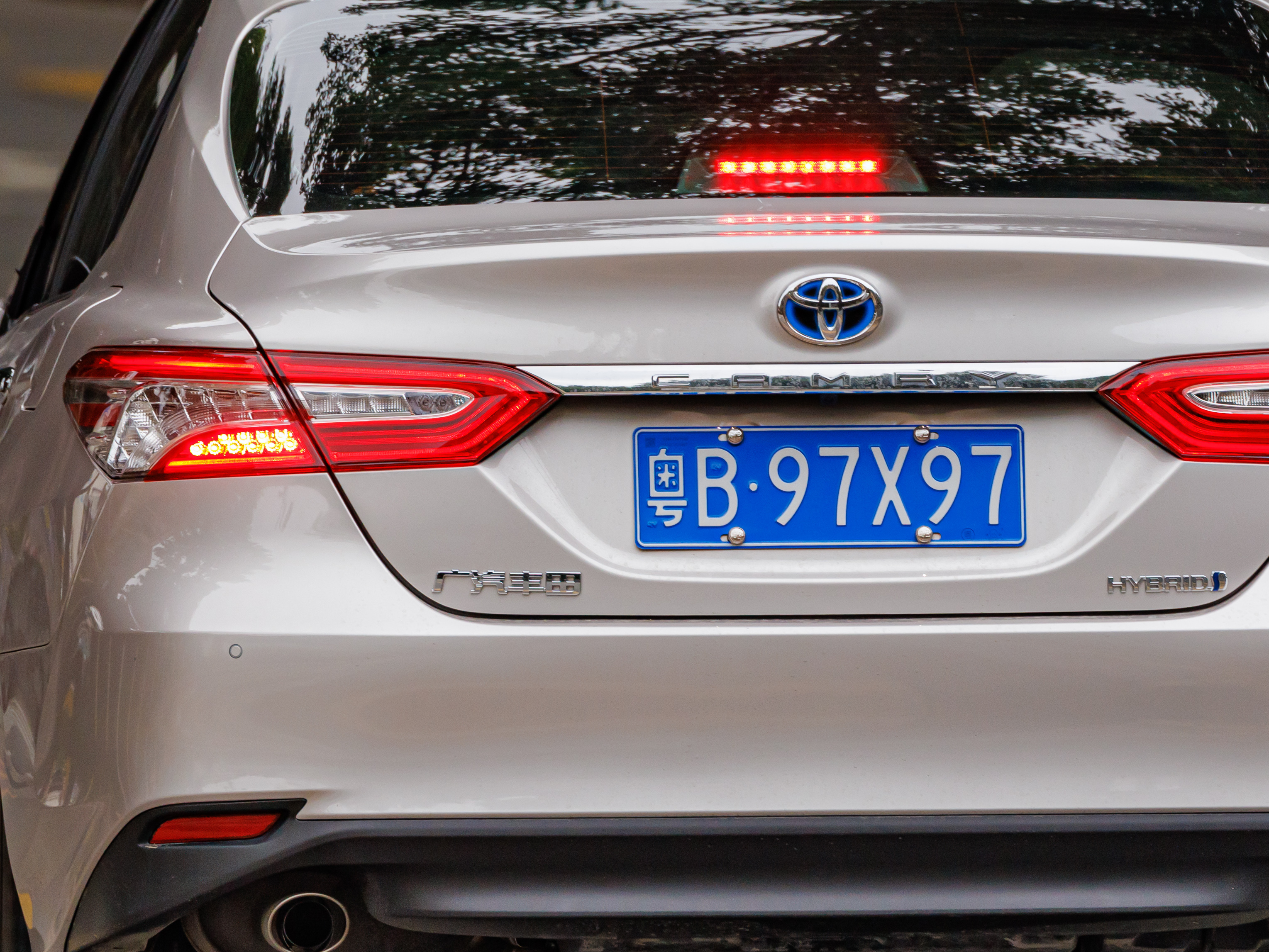
A Toyota Camry with "广汽丰田" (GAC Toyota) mandatory rear badging

Another Chinese automotive market phenomenon is the requirement for a manufacturer name badging in Chinese characters on the rear of every locally produced vehicle. The badging is mandated by the "Measures for the Administration of External Markings of Automotive Products" implemented by the Chinese government in February 2006, which specifically requires manufacturers to write the names of automobile manufacturers in Chinese characters in a specific size and material. Its purpose is to highlight the vehicle's "Made in China" status. This regulation does not apply to imported vehicles or exported vehicles.

== Green vehicles ==
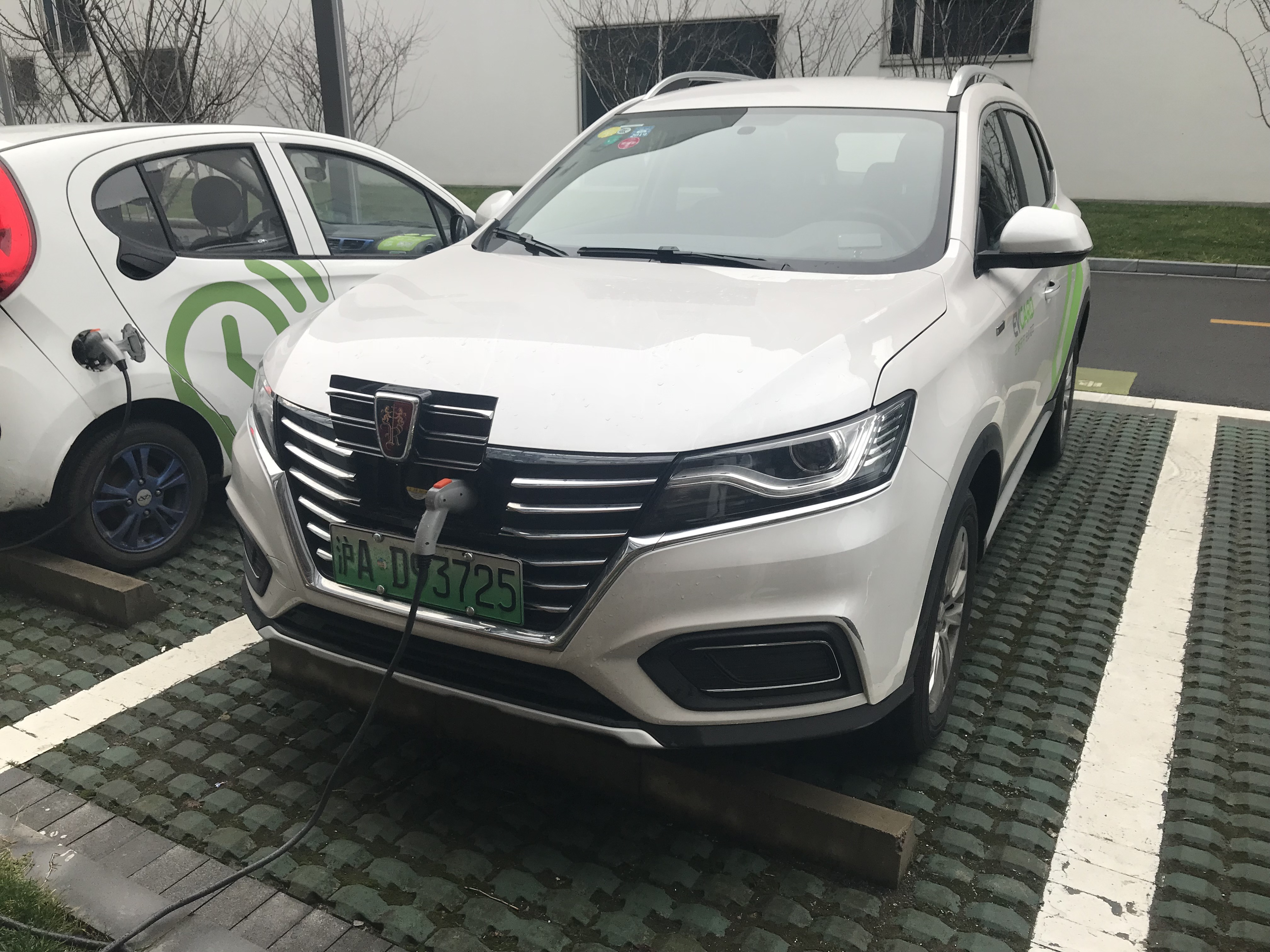
A Roewe eRX5 electric car charging. New energy vehicles in China are distinguished by its light green license plate.

China encourages the development of clean and fuel-efficient vehicles in an effort to sustain the continued growth of the country's automobile industry (see Fuel economy in automobiles). By the end of 2007, China plans to reduce the average fuel consumption per 100 km for all types of vehicles by 10%. The proportion of vehicles burning alternate fuel will be increased to help optimize the country's energy consumption. Priority has been given to facilitating the research and development of electric and hybrid vehicles as well as alternative fuel vehicles, especially CNG/LNG.

=== Environmental standards ===
On March 10, 2008, Beijing became the first city to require light-duty vehicles to meet the China-4 emission standard, which was equivalent to Euro-4. Beijing shifted its emission standards to the fifth-stage standards for light-duty and heavy-duty vehicles in January 2013 and August 2015, respectively. On 12 April 2016, the Ministry of Environmental Protection (MEP) released the proposal for the light-duty China-6 standard.

=== Electric vehicles ===
Due to serious air pollution problems and ever-increasing traffic, alternative-energy vehicle production is an area of strong focus for the Chinese government, and several electric vehicle-friendly policies have appeared at the national and local levels as a result. In many cities, free licenses — otherwise a significant expenditure for traditional vehicles — are provided for electric vehicle owners, along with exemptions for registry lotteries. These policies have created a strong interest in new energy vehicles in China.

As of December 2015, China is the world's largest electric bus market, and by 2020, the country was expected to account for more than 50% of the global electric bus market. China also is the world's leader in the plug-in heavy-duty segment, including electric buses, plug-in trucks, particularly sanitation/garbage trucks.

Cumulative sales of new energy vehicles in China between 2011 and 2021

The government was encouraging the purchase of such cars with a short wait time for a new license plate and with government-backed discounts of up to 40% on electric vehicles. In 2018, new-energy vehicles accounted for about 3% of China's new car sales.

In October 2018, Tesla purchased land for the construction of an EV manufacturing plant in Shanghai's Lingang area. By then, VW had already begun construction of its EV factory, with a planned annual capacity of 300,000 SAIC-VW MEB platform vehicles.

As of 2022, major electric vehicle players in the Chinese industry include BYD Auto, Tesla China, SAIC-GM-Wuling, GAC Aion, and Changan Automobile. These five companies held more than 50 percent market share combined. According to data from China's automotive trade body, Chinese brands accounted for 76% of global electric car sales through October 2024.

==== Government policies ====
The Chinese Automotive Industry Plan, announced on the main website of China's central government, said China aims to create capacity to produce 500,000 new energy vehicles, such as battery electric cars and plug-in hybrid vehicles. The plan aims to increase sales of such new-energy cars to account for about 5% of China's passenger vehicle sales. At the 2010 Beijing Motor Show, more than 20 electric vehicles were on display, most of which came from native automakers. As of May 2010, at least 10 all-electric models have been reported to be on track for volume production.

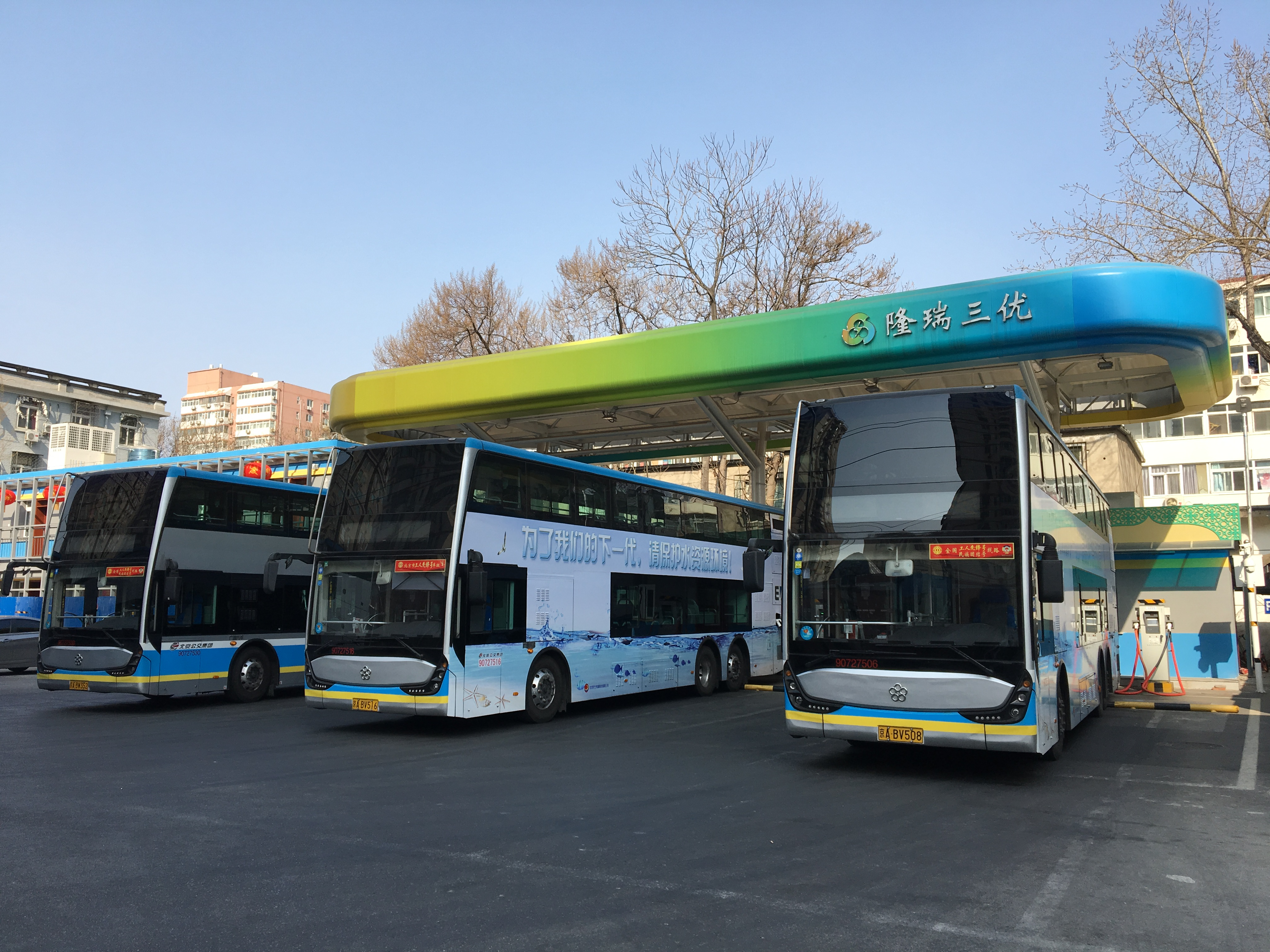
Electric buses at a charging depot in Beijing, one of the cities prioritized for governmental electric vehicle subsidies.

In 2009, the Chinese government implemented policies to subsidize the purchase of plug-in hybrid and electric cars and buses in 10 cities. The per unit subsidies for passenger cars ranged between RMB 4,000 to RMB 60,000. In ten major cities such as Beijing and Xi'an, Chinese EV producers worked closely with taxi companies to formulate operational solutions that would improve core battery technologies, such as implementing multiple shifts.

On November 2, 2020, the Chinese government introduced the "New Energy Vehicle Industry Development Plan (2021–2035)" to achieve a sustainable automotive future with reduced emissions. This plan is part of supportive policies aimed at strengthening the EV industry. On 21 June 2023, China unveiled a significant RMB 520 billion (US$72.3 billion) tax incentive package spanning four years to provide tax breaks for new energy vehicles. It offers a complete exemption from purchase tax for electric vehicles bought in 2024 and 2025, resulting in potential savings of up to RMB 30,000 (US$4,170) per vehicle. From 2026 to 2027, the exemption will be halved and capped at RMB 15,000 (US$2,078). This initiative aims to stimulate automotive industry growth amidst sluggish auto sales. Regions like Shenzhen and Shanghai have also introduced local initiatives to support the electric vehicle industry, including financial support and implementation plans to drive growth in their respective regions.

== Exports ==
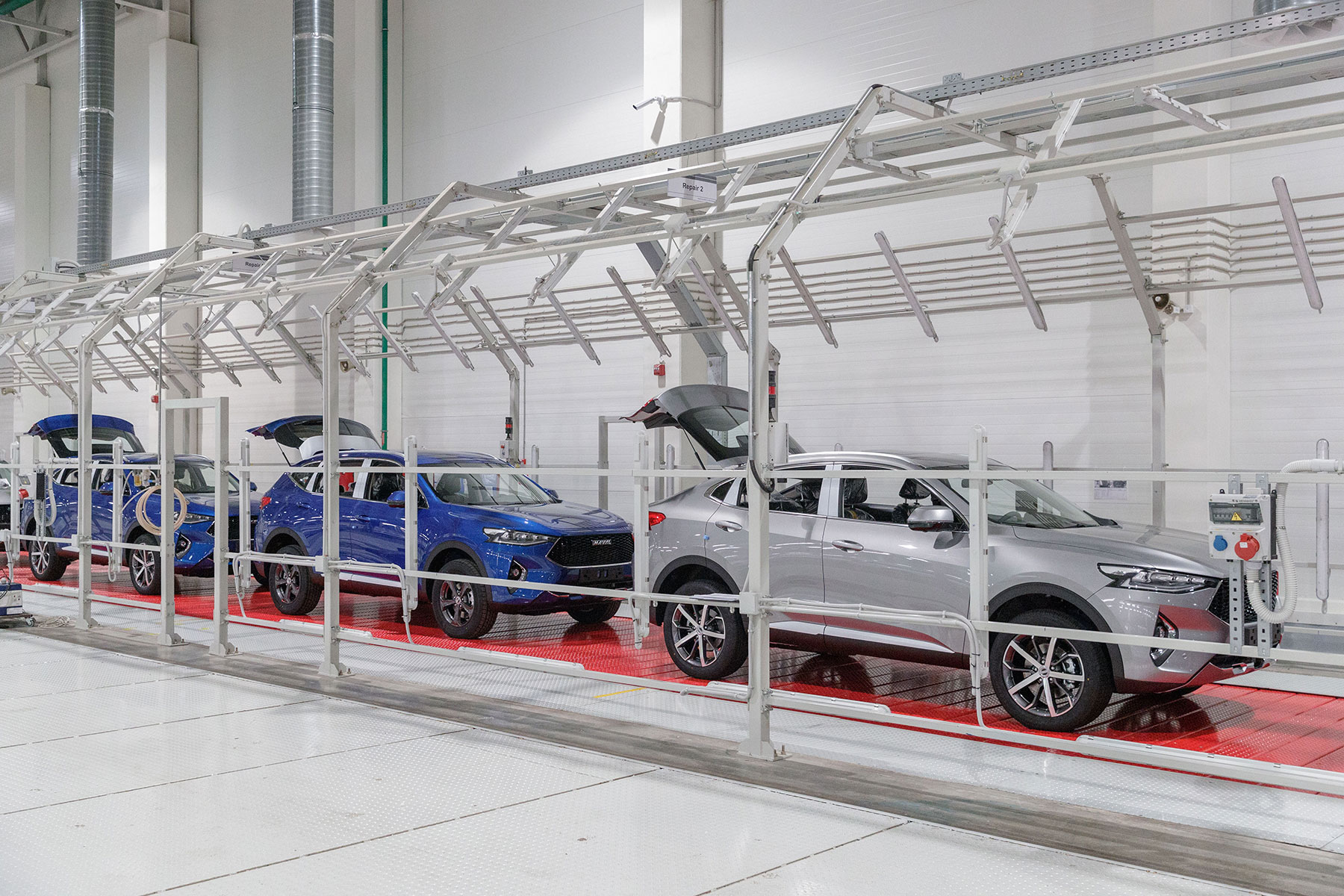
Great Wall Motor exports some cars to Russia as knock-down kits, to be assembled in a Haval factory in Tula Oblast.

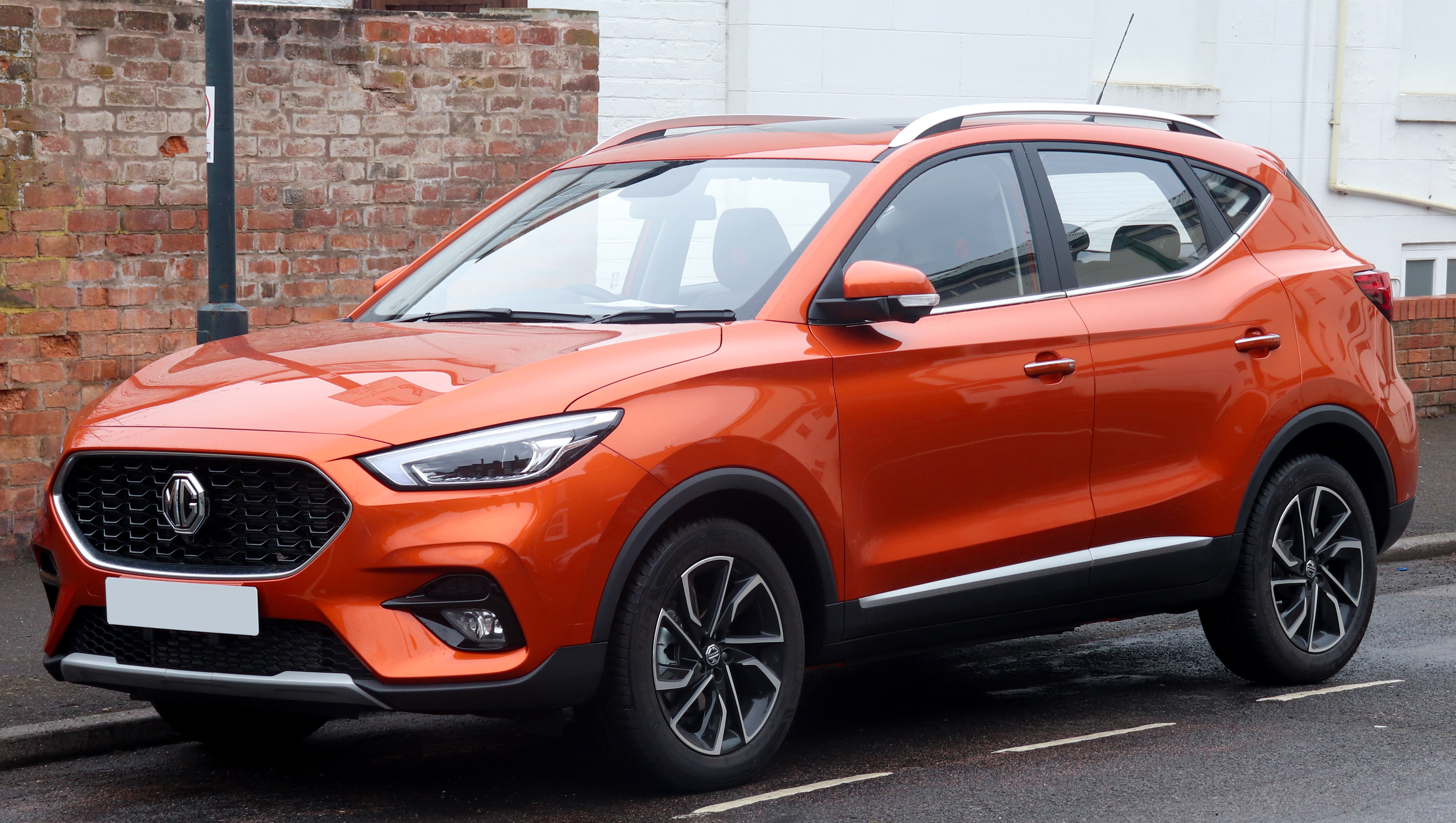
MG ZS is the most exported Chinese car model in 2023, with a total of 251,000 units sold overseas.

In 2012, exports of Chinese automobiles were about 1 million vehicles per year and mostly to emerging markets. By 2022, Chinese car exports reached 3.11 million units, ranking second worldwide. Domestic sales still accounted for the bulk of the 27 million units produced. Electric cars sales totaled 679,000. In 2023, China overtook Japan, becoming the largest car exporter in the world. The increased export numbers contributed to the growing demand for electric cars.

Unlike local Chinese manufacturers, joint venture manufacturers were reluctant to export their vehicles from China due to having to share 50% of the profit with its local partner, as opposed to keeping a full profit by exporting from fully owned plants elsewhere. Notable exceptions in the early era included Honda, which formed China Honda Automobile in 2003 to produce vehicles for exports to Europe, and SAIC-VW that exported the Volkswagen Polo to Australia in 2004. As a result of excess production capacity, low cost of production, and the more accessible electric car supply chain, some joint ventures such as SAIC-GM, Changan Ford and Jiangling Motors (since 2018), Beijing Hyundai (since 2018), Jiangsu Yueda Kia Motors (since 2018), Dongfeng Honda and GAC Honda (since 2023), Volkswagen Anhui (since 2024), FAW-Volkswagen (since 2025), and others started shipping vehicles from China to overseas markets.

According to a report from McKinsey, while Chinese car companies have performed well in overseas markets in recent years, their operating model remains based on "pure export," making them less mature when compared to international car companies that have been deeply involved in overseas markets for many years. For example, only around 40% of Japanese vehicle manufacturers' sales are produced in Japan, while 60% are produced and sold in overseas markets it operates in.

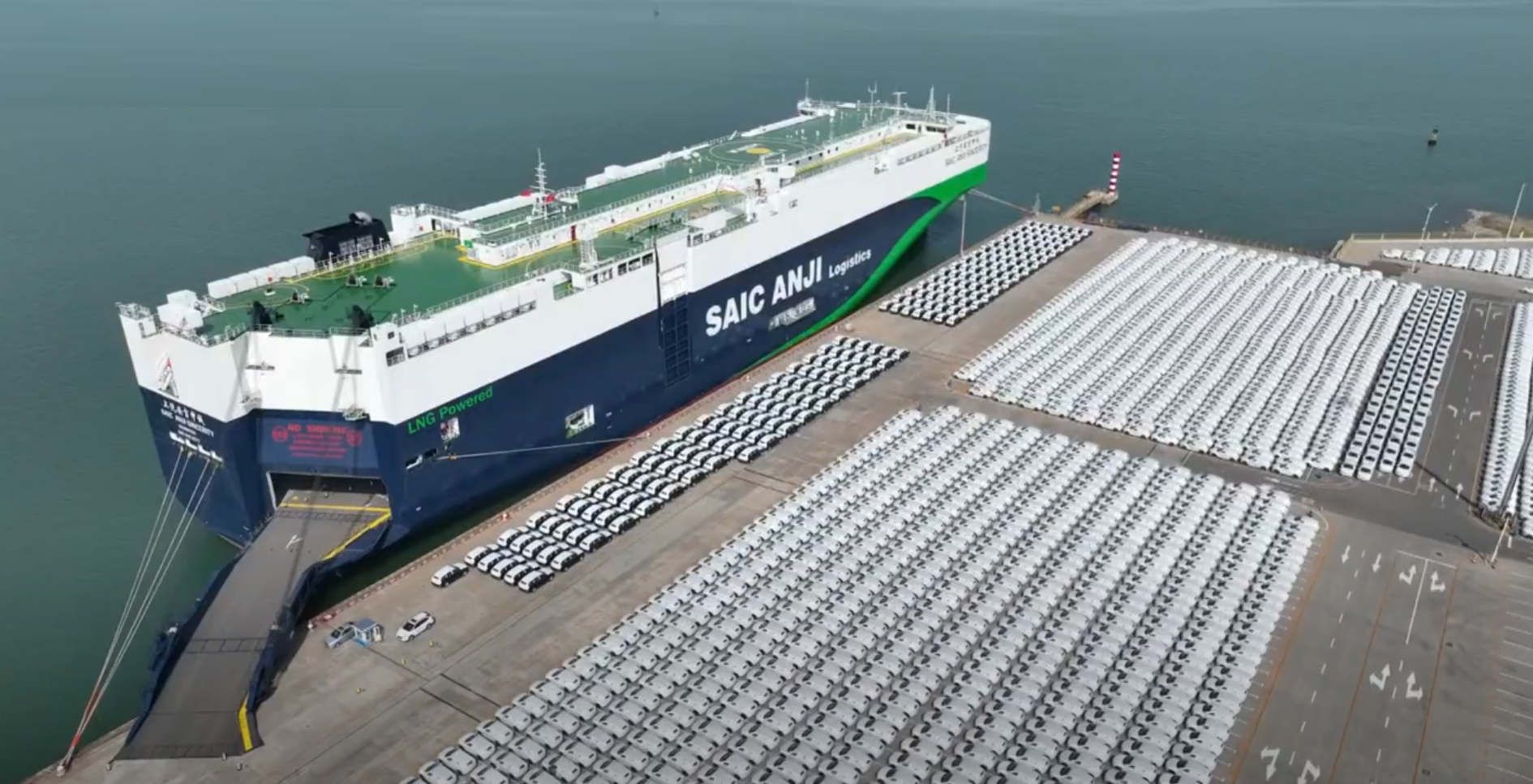
A ro-ro ship owned by SAIC Anji Logistics at the Tianjin port

China's Belt and Road Initiative (BRI) gave impetus to the country's automotive industry, as BRI member countries have tended to receive almost double the Chinese automobile exports when compared to non-BRI member countries. As of at least 2024, the Chinese EV industry is in a strong competitive position in the developing world market, including Southeast Asia.

Export volume of Chinese automobile industry
Year	Total	Passenger vehicle	Commercial vehicle
2010	544,900	283,000	261,900
2011	814,000	476,100	338,200
2012	1,056,100	661,200	394,900
2013	977,300	596,300	381,000
2014	910,400	533,000	377,300
2015	699,400	345,400	354,000
2016	708,000	477,000	231,000
2017	891,000	639,000	252,000
2018	1,041,000	758,000	283,000
2019	1,024,000	725,000	299,000
2020	995,000	760,000	235,000
2021	2,015,000	1,614,000	402,000
2022	3,111,000	2,529,000	582,000
2023	5,220,000	4,450,000	770,000
2024	5,859,000	4,955,000	904,000
2025	7,098,000	6,038,000	1,060,000

The top 10 most-exported manufacturers in China
Rank	2025		2024		2023		2022		2021		2020		2019		2018	
1	Chery	1,344,000	Chery	1,144,000	SAIC	1,090,000	SAIC	906,000	SAIC	598,000	SAIC	323,000	SAIC	285,000	SAIC	238,200
2	BYD	1,054,000	SAIC	929,000	Chery	925,000	Chery	452,000	Chery	269,000	Chery	114,000	Chery	96,000	Chery	122,900
3	SAIC	950,000	Changan	536,000	Geely	408,000	Tesla	271,000	Tesla	163,000	Changan	82,000	Dongfeng	86,000	BAIC	77,000
4	Changan	637,000	Geely	532,000	Changan	358,000	Changan	249,000	Changan	159,000	Geely	73,000	BAIC	80,000	JAC	74,800
5	Geely	606,000	GWM	453,000	Tesla	344,000	Dongfeng	242,000	Dongfeng	154,000	GWM	70,000	Changan	68,000	Dongfeng	73,800
6	GWM	506,000	BYD	433,000	GWM	316,000	Geely	198,000	GWM	143,000	Dongfeng	69,000	GWM	65,000	Changan	61,400
7	BAIC	308,000	BAIC	274,000	BYD	252,000	GWM	173,000	Geely	115,000	BAIC	54,000	Geely	58,000	Volvo	55,800
8	Dongfeng	280,000	Tesla	260,000	Dongfeng	231,000	JAC	115,000	BAIC	81,000	Volvo	41,000	JAC	45,000	GWM	47,000
9	Tesla	226,000	JAC	249,000	BAIC	190,000	BAIC	110,000	JAC	74,000	JAC	37,000	Volvo	44,000	FAW	43,600
10	JAC	222,000	Dongfeng	246,000	JAC	170,000	Sinotruk	83,000	Sinotruk	54,000	Sinotruk	31,000	Sinotruk	40,000	Brilliance	43,400

The figures of SAIC includes the SAIC-GM and SAIC-GM-Wuling joint ventures

== Foreign tariffs and restrictions ==
During the 2020s, the export of Chinese-built automobiles has notably increased. However, their presence abroad has led to heightened tariffs and restrictions, attributed to allegations such as dumping, state subsidies, production overcapacity, national security, and forced labor. Critics argue that such allegations are a justification for protectionism.

=== United States ===
In response to forced technology transfer allegations, the U.S. launched a probe in 2017 under Section 301 of the Trade Act of 1974.

During the first presidency of Donald Trump, the U.S. imposed a stiff 27.5 percent tariff for Chinese-made cars and has buttressed that with the protectionist tax credits of President Joe Biden's Inflation Reduction Act, which incentivized electric car and battery production in North America. In addition, hostility toward China from leaders in both political parties of U.S. make it difficult for Chinese carmakers to penetrate the U.S. market.

In November 2023, the United States House Select Committee on Strategic Competition between the United States and the Chinese Communist Party asked the Office of the United States Trade Representative to further hike tariffs on Chinese-made vehicles and investigate ways to prevent Chinese companies from exporting to the United States from Mexico to protect the U.S. automobile industry. In December 2023, the U.S. government rolled out rules for electric vehicle tax credits so that any car using parts that comes from company which has more than 25 percent of board seats controlled by China will be disqualified from a US$7,500 subsidy.

In February 2024, the U.S. government blocked the import of several models of Volkswagen vehicles under the Uyghur Forced Labor Prevention Act, accusing some component of them were produced under forced labor in Xinjiang. Volkswagen previously denied the accusations, claiming that they could not find any indications or evidence of forced labor among the employees through a third party audit.

In April 2024, when the U.S. Treasury Secretary Janet Yellen visited China, she accused the Chinese automotive industry of having overcapacity and tilting the playing field away from American workers and firms. While some industry observers consider that the issue of overcapacity raised by U.S. is an excuse for protectionism.

In May 2024, the U.S. Commerce Secretary Gina Raimondo said the U.S. could take "extreme action" to ban Chinese vehicles or impose restrictions on them for national security reasons. U.S. President Joe Biden later unveiled a hike in tariffs on Chinese-made EVs, quadrupling the duties from 25 percent to over 100 percent. The International Monetary Fund criticized the Biden administration's decision to raise tariffs on Chinese goods, including EVs, urging the U.S. to maintain open trade policies.

=== Canada ===
In August 2024, Canada announced a 100% tariff on imported Chinese electric vehicles in addition to other tariffs. In January 2026, this was reduced to 6.1%.

=== European Union ===
In September 2023, European Commission President Ursula von der Leyen announced EU would launch an anti-subsidy investigation into Chinese electric vehicle manufacturers. Von der Leyen claims that the global markets are "flooded" with cheaper Chinese electric cars, and their price is kept artificially low by significant state subsidies that distort the EU market. Chinese newspaper People's Daily stated that the investigation proposed by the EU is a practice of protectionism in the name of "fair competition." Carlos Tavares, the CEO of Stellantis criticized the investigation, stating it is not the optimal approach to global trade issues. He stressed the need for a global perspective to address challenges and promote competition and urged European politicians to support the region's automakers in competing with Chinese rivals offering competitively priced vehicles.

Chinese companies have been able sell cars at significantly higher prices with larger profit margins in the EU than in the Chinese domestic market. According to research group Rhodium Group, European duties of around 45 to 55 percent would be needed to render exports to the European market unappealing.

Following the EU's anti-subsidy investigation, in June 2024, the European Commission (EC) announced new tariffs for Chinese-built electric vehicles (on top of an existing 10 percent tariff for all foreign-made vehicles regardless of engine type), which went into effect on 4 July 2024. While analysts had variously predicted tariffs of between 10 and 25 percent, the EC would impose tariffs up to 38.1 percent. Electric vehicles made by BYD would face a 17.4 percent import duty, vehicles from Geely will be subject to a 20 percent duty, and vehicles from state-owned SAIC Motor would be subjected to the highest tariff of 38.1 percent. Manufacturers that neither received inspections nor provided information would face the maximum duty of 38.1 percent, while those that cooperated would be charged 21 percent. On 26 June, after receiving more information from the affected companies, the EU reduced the proposed tariffs from 38.1 percent to 37.6 percent for SAIC, and 20 percent to 19.9 percent for Geely.

China's Ministry of Commerce criticized the EU for "ignoring" facts, WTO regulations, objections from China, and appeals from various EU member states and industries. German Chancellor Olaf Scholz cautioned against limiting automotive trade with China, emphasizing the importance of keeping markets open. German automakers such as Volkswagen and BMW, who collectively sold 4.6 million cars in China in 2022, would be significantly impacted by trade tensions. Western manufacturers, including Mercedes-Benz, have opposed the tariffs, with concerns about market openness. Mercedes-Benz faces vulnerability as the Chinese market is its primary export market. Volkswagen said the decision's timing is seen as unfavorable for electric vehicle demand, raising concerns about potential trade conflict escalation.

In July 2024, SAIC Motor issued a statement stating that it would formally request the European Commission to hold a hearing on the anti-subsidy investigation. The company claimed that the European Commission's investigation asked SAIC to disclose its commercially sensitive information including battery-related chemical formulas, which SAIC declined as it is beyond the scope of a normal investigation. In September 2024, the EU rejected offers from Chinese electric vehicle makers for minimum import prices.

In October 2024, EU leaders approved additional tariffs on Chinese EVs, despite opposition from five countries, including Germany, which warned the decision could harm its auto industry. The European Commission, having provisionally backed the tariffs after finding unfair state aid to Chinese manufacturers, was set to impose duties of up to 35.3% for five years starting in November 2024. While ten member states, including France and Italy, supported the tariffs, Germany and Hungary opposed them, citing potential damage to local carmakers. The decision sparked concerns of a trade war with China, which condemned the move as protectionist. China launched a WTO complaint in response.

==== Technology transfer demands ====
In November 2024, the Financial Times reported that the EU is planning to require Chinese automotive companies to transfer technology to European businesses in return for EU subsidies. The proposal triggered widespread criticism among Chinese automotive industry.

=== Turkey ===
In June 2024, Turkey implemented a 40 percent additional tariff or a US$7,000 minimum tariff, whichever is higher, on vehicle imports from China, effective July 7, 2024. This decision follows Turkey's introduction of additional tariffs on Chinese electric vehicle imports in 2023. The rationale behind Turkey's policy is to safeguard domestic vehicle production and reduce the current account deficit. Chinese automobile brands such as Chery are considering setting up production facilities in Turkey to circumvent the tariffs. In July 2024, Turkey announced that companies which invested in Turkey would be exempt from the new tariffs.

=== India ===
India has been proactive in rejecting investment plans from Chinese car manufacturers due to the Sino-Indian border dispute and a tougher stance towards investments from China. Great Wall Motor initially proposed an investment of US$1 billion and had plans to start manufacturing in 2021 by buying a former General Motors plant, before canceling its plans in July 2022 due to failure of obtaining regulatory approvals. In July 2023, BYD Auto was forced to cancel its investment plans worth US$1 billion to produce cars in India due to scrutiny from the Indian government, noting "security concerns", despite 16-year presence of BYD Company in the country producing electronics and electric buses. MG Motor India had struggled to receive clearance from the Indian Government to obtain capital from parent SAIC Motor until a local company JSW Group acquired a 35% share in the company.

== Analysis ==
=== Technology transfer policies ===
In the 2010s, allegations of forced technology transfer arose in the Western automotive sector and beyond. The criticism centered around the government's joint venture policies, which required technology transfer in exchange for access to the country's sizable domestic market. Criticism grew following the government's eleventh five-year plan, which adopted a more focused approach to technology transfer in advanced technology. In 2010, foreign automakers complained about a Ministry of Industry and Information Technology plan which they said compelled sharing of critical technologies in electric vehicles.

According to The New York Times, General Motors was asked to disclose key technological information on the Volt. Steve Girsky, the vice chairman of General Motors, told reporters that neither SAIC nor the Chinese government have requested Volt technology.

The Chinese government has consistently denied allegations of impropriety, stated that technology transfer is in line with WTO rules. In 2017, the Ministry of Commerce stated that the establishment of joint ventures by foreign companies in China is a voluntary behavior and that there is no law in China that forces foreign investors to transfer technology. In 2019, in an effort to attract additional foreign investors and respond to criticism, the National People's Congress passed a law making forced technology transfers illegal.

==== Commentary ====
German economist Daniel Gros suggested that costs to Western companies imposed by technology transfer are "vastly overstated." He also stated that increasing royalties payments to foreign automakers suggests that a "large and growing share" of technology transfer is not forced. Yu Yongding, a member of the Chinese Academy of Social Sciences, said that foreign companies clearly understand what benefits they can get through partnerships with Chinese companies, which means such cooperation is mutually beneficial.

=== Security ===
Jim Saker, president of the Institute of the Motor Industry in the UK, describes Chinese cars in the UK as "invasion by trojan horse" and alleges there are "major security issues" with Chinese cars. He claimed there was "no way" of preventing these vehicles being disabled remotely by car companies in China. No evidence was provided by Saker to substantiate his claims, with other experts dismissing them as scaremongering.

== See also ==
- Automobile manufacturers and brands of China
- List of automobile manufacturers of China
- List of foreign brand vehicles developed and manufactured by automobile companies of China
- Economy of China
- Electric vehicle industry in China
- Motorcycle industry in China
- Renewable electricity
- Renewable energy in China
- Cantopop
- Gambling in Macau
