= Catfish effect =

Effect in organizational theory

The catfish effect is the motivational effect that the introduction of a strong competitor — who upsets the status quo — has on other participants, whose performance would otherwise decline due to laziness and procrastination, to improve themselves in order to meet the new challenge.

The term allegedly originates from the fishing industry. In Norway, live sardines are sold several times more expensive than frozen ones and are valued for better texture and flavor. Legend says that only one fishing vessel had managed to bring live sardines home every time, and the shipmaster kept his method a trade secret. After he died, people found that there was a catfish in the fish tank, who keeps swimming and startles the caught sardines to also keep moving and avoid predation. The increased stimuli and reactive activities keep the sardines active instead of becoming sedentary, thus helping them to stay alive longer.

In human resource management, this is a method used to motivate a team so that each member feels compelled to perform against strong competition, thus keeping up the competitiveness of the whole team. Actions done to actively apply this effect in an organization are termed catfish management.

== Origin of the effect ==
The exact origin is unknown. There are very few discussions of this effect in the English literature, but it is widely cited and discussed in the Chinese literature such as library research.

== See also ==
- Catfishing
