= Third Five-Year Plan =

Third Five-Year plan may refer to:

- Third Five-Year Plan (Bhutan)
- Third Five-Year Plan (China)
- Third Five-Year Plan (India)
- Third Five-Year Plan (Nepal)
- Third Five-Year Plans (Pakistan)
- Third Five-Year Plan (Romania)
- Third Five-Year Plan (South Korea)
- Third Five-Year Plan (Soviet Union)
- Third Five-Year Plan (Vietnam)

== See also ==
- Five-year plan
- Second Five-Year Plan (disambiguation)
- Fourth Five-Year Plan (disambiguation)
