= Fourth five-year plan =

Fourth Five-Year Plan may refer to:

- Fourth five-year plan of Bhutan
- Fourth five-year plan of China
- Fourth five-year plan of India
- Fourth five-year plan of Nepal
- Fourth five-year plan of Pakistan
- Fourth five-year plan of Romania
- Fourth five-year plan of South Korea
- Fourth Five-Year Plan (Soviet Union)
- Fourth five-year plan of Vietnam

== See also ==
- Five-year plan
- Third Five-Year Plan (disambiguation)
- Fifth Five-Year Plan (disambiguation)
