= Second Five-Year Plan =

Second Five-Year Plan may refer to:

- Second five-year plan of Argentina
- Second Five-Year Plan (Bhutan)
- Second Five-Year Plan (China)
- Second Five-Year Plan (India)
- Second Five-Year Plan (Nepal)
- Second Five-Year Plans (Pakistan)
- Second Five-Year Plan (Romania)
- Second Five-Year Plan (South Korea)
- Second Five-Year Plan (Soviet Union)
- Second Five-Year Plan (Vietnam)

== See also ==
- Five-year plan
- Third Five-Year Plan (disambiguation)
