= Seventh Five-Year Plan =

Seventh Five-Year Plan may refer to:

- Seventh five-year plan (China)
- Seventh five-year plan (Soviet Union)
- Seventh Five-Year Plans (Pakistan)

== See also ==
- Five-year plan (disambiguation)
- Fifth Five-Year Plan (disambiguation)
- Sixth Five-Year Plan (disambiguation)
