= Sixth Five-Year Plan =

Sixth Five-Year Plan may refer to:

- Sixth Five-Year Plan (People's Republic of China)
- Sixth Five-Year Plan (Soviet Union)
- Sixth Five-Year Plans (Pakistan)

== See also ==
- Five-year plan (disambiguation)
- Fifth Five-Year Plan (disambiguation)
- Seventh Five-Year Plan (disambiguation)
