= Trade policy of South Korea =

Exports of South Korea by product category (2019) Chemical products Transportation Machines Mineral products Plastics and rubbers Metals Foodstuffs Precious metals Textiles Instruments Animal products Vegetable products Paper goods Footwear and headwear Miscellaneous Stone and glass Wood products Animal and vegetable bi-products Animal hides Arts and antiques Weapons

This article is intended to give an overview of the trade policy of South Korea. In 1945 Korea was liberated from the Empire of Japan at the end of World War II. A destructive drought in 1958 forced Korea to import large amounts of food grains. In 1950, the Korean War (a war between the Republic of Korea and the Democratic People's Republic of Korea) broke out, which destroyed more than two-thirds of the nation's production facilities and most of its infrastructure. Trade policy of South Korea has taken many shifts, from import substitution to globalization and there has been significant impact on the economy for the same.

== Post independence: Asian financial crisis ==
Throughout the 1950s Korea was underdeveloped and 60 percent of its population was employed in farming activities. Foreign policy during that time focused on securing maximum foreign aid. Foreign aid comprised almost half the national budget through 1960. Foreign assistance was allowed only for the import of basic goods which was necessary for economy to survive, while exports were minimal. During that time, U.S. aborted its plans to provide $500 million in investment for development because of the political turmoil. Reduction in foreign aid hit import – dependent industries by cutting the supply of raw materials leading to economic downturn. Materials which were essential for rehabilitation of country like cement and steel were produced domestically to reduce dependence on imports.

To earn foreign currency Korea also sold few natural resources overseas. But the earnings were small. There was no formal trade policy at that time. In 1962, Korea embarked on a massive industrialization based on exports. An export centric development strategy was introduced, and exports of labor – intensive, light manufactured goods were aggressively promoted. Financial incentives such as tax – free imports of raw materials encouraged the production of export goods, stimulating the growth in textile and electrical machine industries. Korea had comparative advantage in these industries which absorbed well educated and highly motivated workers at low wages. The primary goal of export promotion was to earn foreign currency, obviously imports were discouraged. Trade grew from US$500 million in 1962 to US$2.8 billion in 1970. In percentage point trade grew at 40.8 percent during the 1960s.

In the early 1970s, third five-year plan focused on heavy and chemical industries. Hence new engine of growth shifted from light manufacturing to heavy manufacturing. Meanwhile, Korea continued with its export promotion and import restriction policies. The production of automobiles began while imported cars virtually disappeared from the market. Increase in exports was roughly 45 percent a year.

In the late 1970s because of increase in oil prices, the cost of its oil imports increased by 200 percent in a year. In the early 1980s, exports in heavy industries reached UD$17.5 billion. Soon by the mid-1980s, Korea's economic growth was recognized internationally and world criticized its export intensive economy. Unfavorable global conditions hit Korea's export intensive economy. Korean policy makers realized the need to open markets and create more competition and to boost the international competitiveness of domestic industries.

An important transformation occurred in Korea's trade policy in the sixth five-year plan, which witnessed the change in trend from heavy industry toward export – oriented consumer products, including electronics and high tech. Foreign investment policies were relaxed in response to a decrease in domestic investment, cross-border capital movement increased significantly. Restrictions on imports were removed, but a variety of non-tariff barriers complicated trade structure. In 1986, Korea for the first time achieved a favorable trade balance, a trade surplus of US$4.2 billion. However the transformations in the trade policy eventually lead to challenges in the 1990s. In the 1990s domestic consumption of luxury goods increased including high tech and electronics products which reduced exports which resulted in Korea's trade deficit and current account deficit. In the mid-1990s Korea reduced tariff rates and import restriction on autos, high tech products and financial services.

== South Korea and the Asian currency crisis ==
Korean Banks and Chaebol borrowed heavily from the foreign banks on a short-term basis. The money was taken to fund investment in the industries at the encouragement of the government. The heavy reliance on the short-term foreign loans led the Korean economy to suffer from the currency crisis, as foreign reserves were insufficient to deal with financial stability. The Korean debt problem got worse when one of the Chaebols, called Hanbo, collapsed with US$ 6 billion debt. There were allegations that banks were pressurized by the government after being bribed by Hanbo. The situation worsened further when another Chaebol called Kia filed for bankruptcy. To make matters worse, the wave of bankruptcies continued among the chaebol. Haitai, Korea's 24th largest business, filed for bankruptcy protection, the government had to bring Kia under public ownership in order to prevent job losses. There was speculation that more than half of the top 30 Chaebols would file for bankruptcy. Many rating agencies like S & P downgraded Korea’s rating making it costlier and difficult to get further credit.

In order to protect the won, the Korean central bank raised the short-term interest rate to over 12 percent. During that time Korea had accumulated a debt about 100 billion dollars that had to paid within a year while the reserve went down to under US$ 6 billion. Korea had to go to IMF to ask for loan. Finally a deal of US$ 55 billion was signed. South Korea also agreed to restrain the chaebols by reducing their share of bank financing and requiring them to publish consolidated financial statements and go for annual independent external audits. While some trade liberalization measures were included in the IMF program, the trade area was not the main part of it. It was in the 1980s that Korea began to eliminate trade barriers, mainly in manufacturing sector not in the agricultural sector, with the belief that the trade liberalization would enhance the nation’s international competitiveness, and increase the welfare of consumers. It was during the financial crisis that the Korean government seriously reviewed the merits and costs of FTAs. While almost all traders in the world are involved in FTAs, non-participation in the trend might look as passive toward trade liberalization, and meet trade diversion without any help. Subsequently, New Zealand, Singapore, Thailand and Japan expressed interest in embarking formal Free trade agreement negotiations with Korea.

In order to come out of recession Korean government took a series of economic reform measures. Restriction in the financial market was relaxed in accordance with the International Monetary Fund (IMF) recommendations. On December 24, 1997, free floating exchange rate was adopted to support liberalization of the capital market. Private firms reduced leverage on foreign debts. Korean central bank amassed sufficient foreign exchange reserves to prepare contingencies such as external financial shocks.

== Post-Asian financial crisis to globalization ==
Following the 2008 financial crisis, the Korean economy contracted by 4.6% in fourth quarter as compared to the third quarter of the same year. Ironically, the reforms in trade policy that were adopted previously affected adversely during that time. The liberalization of the capital market and the shift to free – floating exchange rate regime made it easier for foreign investor and speculators to withdraw capital from the Korean capital market, thereby worsening financial stability.

After the 2008 financial crisis, Korea embarked on new policy focuses on the need to address domestic shortcomings and to increase transparency, accountability, flexibility and the overall competitiveness of the economy through continuous participation in international cooperation, focusing globalization driven by the market and transformation to knowledge based economy.

As a trade-oriented country and a member of WTO, Korea has become a strong supporter of multilateral trade liberalization. Korean government also claims that quick recovery from the 2008 financial crisis has been possible because of multilateral trade agreements. Until recently Korea remained as one of the few WTO member countries without any bilateral or regional FTAs. After the success in multilateral trade agreements, Korea is now engaging herself in FTA since 2003. By entering into FTA, Korea will have access to new markets around the world. FTAs reduce costs such as tariff and non-tariff barriers. FTA increase the competition and thereby improving the efficiency in the market and increase consumer welfare by bringing down the prices of imported goods, as well as by diversifying consumers’ choice. Other factors like Korea’s own internal demand such as its high dependence on foreign trade, the need for securing of export markets and accelerated opening and restructuring of the Korean economy also complimented the decision of Korea to go for FTAs. It would be difficult to assess their impact on Korean economy because these agreements have entered into force recently and we have to wait for empirics for the same.
