= Fifth Five-Year Plan =

Fifth Five-Year Plan may refer to:

- Fifth Five-Year Plan (People's Republic of China)
- Five-Year Plans of India#Fifth Plan (1974–1978)
- Fifth Five-Year Plan (Soviet Union)
- Fifth Five-Year Plans (Pakistan)

== See also ==
- Five-year plan (disambiguation)
- Fourth Five-Year Plan (disambiguation)
- Sixth Five-Year Plan (disambiguation)
