= Five-Year Development Plans =

Indonesian series of national economic development plans

The Repelita (Rencana Pembangunan Lima Tahun; Five-Year Development Plan) programs were a series of national development programs implemented in Indonesia under the New Order regime of President Suharto.

The Repelita programs were implemented between 1969 and 1998, when they were abruptly terminated. During this period, the Repelita programs became the major vehicle for implementing the regime's national development ideology, known as the Development Trilogy.

Formulated under the guidance of the Outlines of State Policy (GBHN) and the technocratic direction of economists like Widjojo Nitisastro, each Repelita established specific, stage-appropriate targets for economic sectors, with a consistent focus on modernizing agriculture and gradually building an industrial base.

The first five Repelita programs (Repelita I to Repelita V) completed an initial development cycle of 25 years, which started in 1969 and ended in 1994. During this period, Indonesia reached major development milestones like national self-sufficiency in rice production in 1984. Repelita VI was initiated but not completed due to the Asian financial crisis of 1997 and the fall of President Suharto.

== Background and Formulation ==
Upon assuming the presidency from Sukarno, Suharto inherited an economy suffering from hyperinflation and severe underdevelopment. To address this, the New Order government formulated a national development ideology called the Development Trilogy, consisting of three pillars: (1) equitable development, (2) economic growth, and (3) national stability.

This ideology was formalized in state policy through the Broad Outlines of State Policy. The GBHN established two foundational frameworks for planning:

1. The Basic Pattern of National Development (Pola Dasar Pembangunan Nasional), which outlined the core principles and resources for all development activities.
2. The General Pattern of Long-Term Development (Pola Umum Pembangunan Jangka Panjang), which defined the strategic direction for a 25–30 year period, constituting one phase of Long-Term Development (Pembangunan Jangka Panjang; PJP).

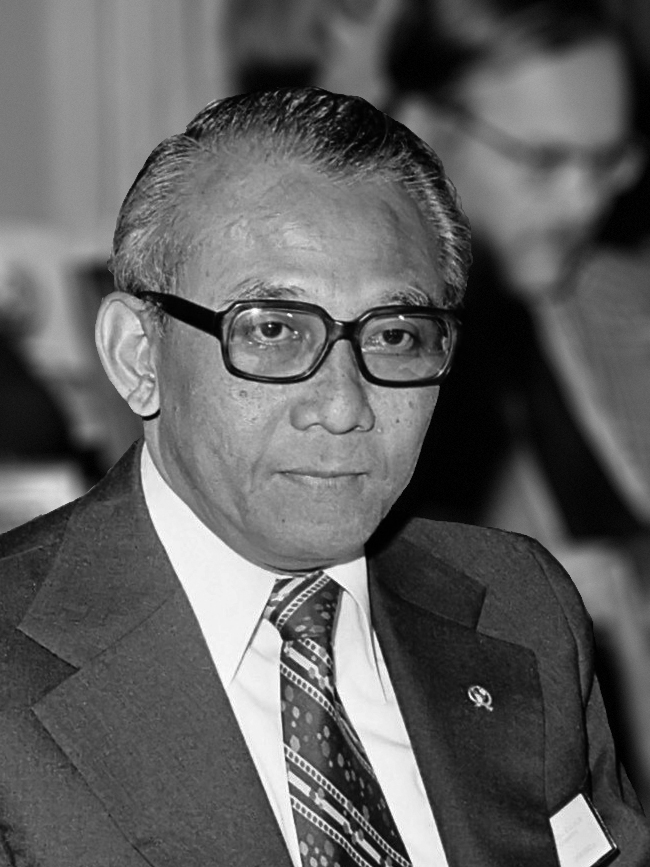
Photo of Widjojo Nitisastro

To implement this long-term strategy, the government created a series of centralized five-year plans known as Repelita. Each Repelita served as a rolling, medium-term operational plan designed to execute the objectives set forth in the long-term pattern, under the guidelines of the basic pattern, and in pursuit of the Trilogy's goals.

Repelita was developed under the direction of Widjojo Nitisastro, the New Order's chief economic architect and head of the National Development Planning Agency (Bappenas). Widjojo was also part of the Berkeley Mafia, a group of Indonesian economists trained at the University of California, Berkeley. Widjojo refined its framework for over a year, arguing that the development process required a long time and that "each five-year plan should place emphasis on different fields, according to the stage of economic development," necessitating careful, stage-appropriate planning.

The first Repelita was introduced by Suharto's First Development Cabinet (Kabinet Pembangunan I), establishing a convention where subsequent cabinets were aligned with each new five-year plan.

== Stages of Repelita ==
=== Overview ===
The Repelita program was implemented in six successive stages until it abruptly ended in the wake of the 1997 Asian financial crisis and the fall of the Suharto regime shortly after. Though each five-year plan had distinct objectives and goals, all operated within the centralized planning framework established by the Broad Outlines of State Policy (GBHN) and were guided by the ideological goals of the Development Trilogy.

In total, the regime executed six five-year plans. These are:

- Repelita I (1969–1974) aimed to improve living standards and lay the groundwork for development, with special emphasis placed on modernizing agriculture and developing basic infrastructure.
- Repelita II (1974–1979) aimed to achieve equitable development and expand infrastructure, including transmigration to alleviate population pressure in Java, Bali, and Madura.
- Repelita III (1979–1984) emphasized equitable distribution of development results through the "Eight Pathways of Equity," while continuing to support agricultural development to achieve rice self-sufficiency.
- Repelita IV (1984–1989) aimed to reduce oil dependence by developing domestic manufacturing capacity in capital goods and non-oil exports through labor-intensive manufacturing.
- Repelita V (1989–1994) emphasized consolidating food self-sufficiency, increasing agricultural production and employment absorption, and developing domestic capacity to produce industrial machinery.
- Repelita VI (1994–incomplete) emphasized the development of industry and agriculture sectors, focusing on improving the quality of human resources. However, this was interrupted by the 1997 crisis.

The regime completed the first 25-year Long-Term Development phase (PJP I) from 1969 to 1994. Repelita VI was the first plan of a projected second 25-year cycle (PJP II, 1994–2019), which was abandoned after the regime's collapse.

=== Repelita I (1969-1974) ===
The first Five-Year Development Plan, Repelita I, was formally inaugurated by President Suharto on 1 April 1969. Its primary objectives were to improve the people's standard of living and to lay the groundwork for further development. The plan focused on several key targets: food, clothing, infrastructure improvement, housing, job creation, and the spiritual welfare of society.

Agricultural development was the main strategic focus, and the plan aimed to modernize Indonesia's traditional farming practices to address the pervasive economic underdevelopment, as the majority of the population then relied on subsistence agriculture. Consequently, during Repelita I, society began transitioning from traditional, agriculture-centered living towards a more modern agricultural system.

The plan aimed for an annual economic growth rate of five percent. During its implementation, the government repaired 1,600 kilometers of roads and rehabilitated at least 380,000 hectares of rice fields. It also provided a central development fund of Rp 100,000 to each village. These projects were credited with reducing unemployment by over 1.4 million people annually.

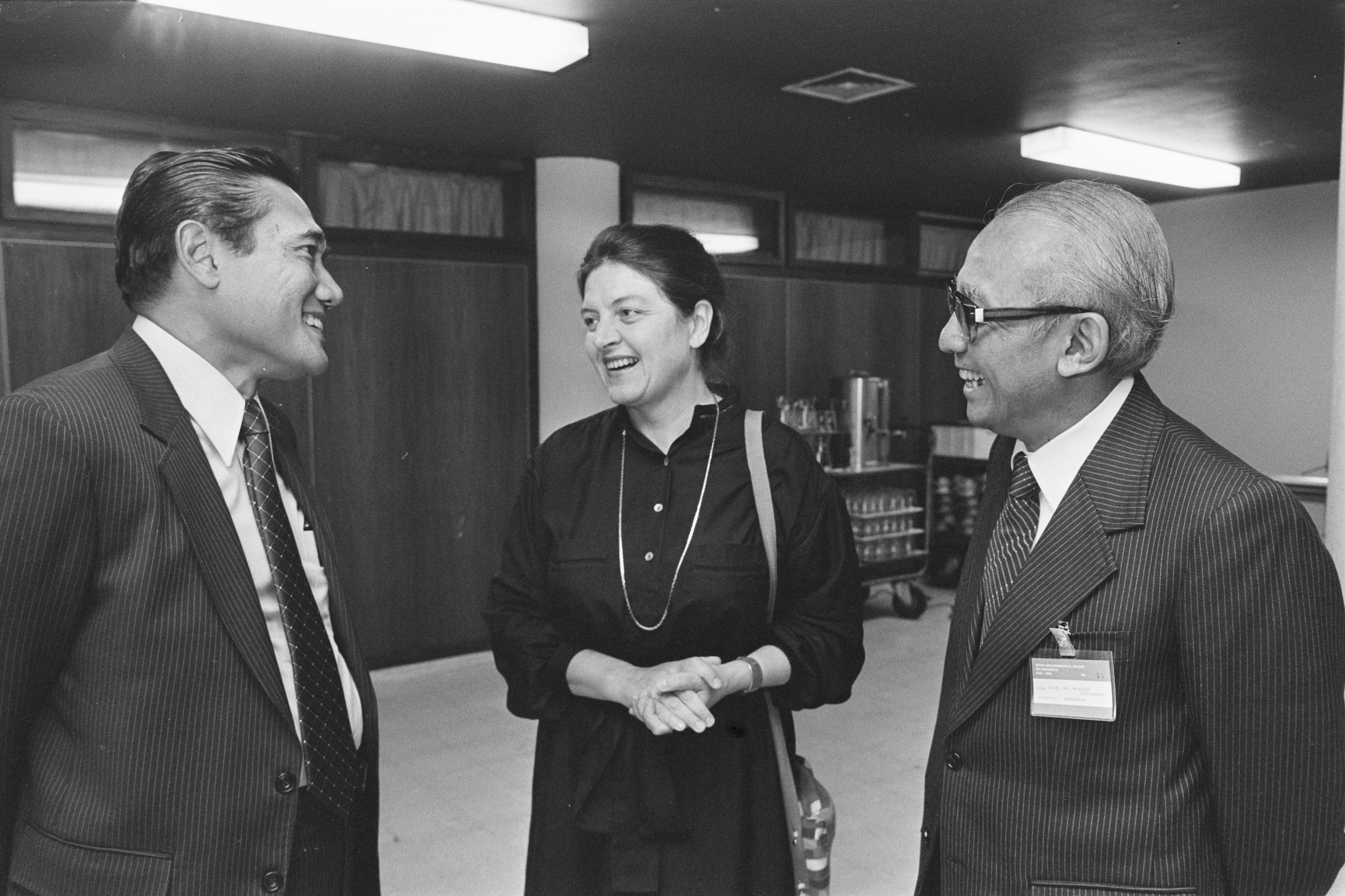
Ministers Ali Wardhana (Indonesia), Eegje Schoo (Netherlands), and Widjojo Nitisastro (Indonesia) at an IGGI meeting in The Hague in June 1983.

The implementation was heavily dependent on external financing coordinated by the Inter-Governmental Group on Indonesia (IGGI), a consortium of Western donor nations and international financial institutions established in 1967. According to historical accounts, approximately three-quarters of Repelita I's expenditure was financed by foreign loans. By the end of the plan in 1974, the loans specifically for Repelita I had reached $877 million. This was part of a larger trend: by 1972, the total new foreign debt accumulated since 1966 had already exceeded the $2.3 billion debt left by the Sukarno administration.

Repelita I concluded on 31 March 1974. It was deemed a success for largely meeting its production and infrastructure targets. Reported economic growth increased to between 3 and 5.7 percent, while inflation was reduced to 47.8 percent from a high of 650 percent during Sukarno's presidency.

=== Repelita II (1974-1979) ===
Repelita II, the second Five-Year Development Plan, began on 1 April 1974 and ended on 31 March 1979.

Repelita II established five primary development targets: (1) the provision of sufficient food and clothing of improved quality at affordable prices; (2) the provision of housing materials and related facilities for the general population; (3) the expansion and improvement of physical infrastructure; (4) the achievement of more equitable and higher levels of public welfare; and (5) the expansion of employment opportunities.

Specific annual growth targets were established for the major economic sectors. Agriculture was targeted to grow at 4.6 percent per year, industry at 13 percent, mining at 10.1 percent, transportation at 10 percent, construction at 9.2 percent, and other sectors collectively at 7.7 percent. These targets were designed to restructure the Indonesian economy and establish a more durable foundation for future development.

Budget allocations increased significantly in all sectors during the period. Labor and transmigration budgets increased from 4.5 billion rupiah in 1974–75 to 94.7 billion rupiah in 1978-79. Budget allocations for education, culture, and youth programs increased at an average annual rate of 54.5 percent, reaching an amount of 758.1 billion rupiah during the five-year period. Health, family planning, and social welfare budget allocations increased at an average rate of 56.3 percent.

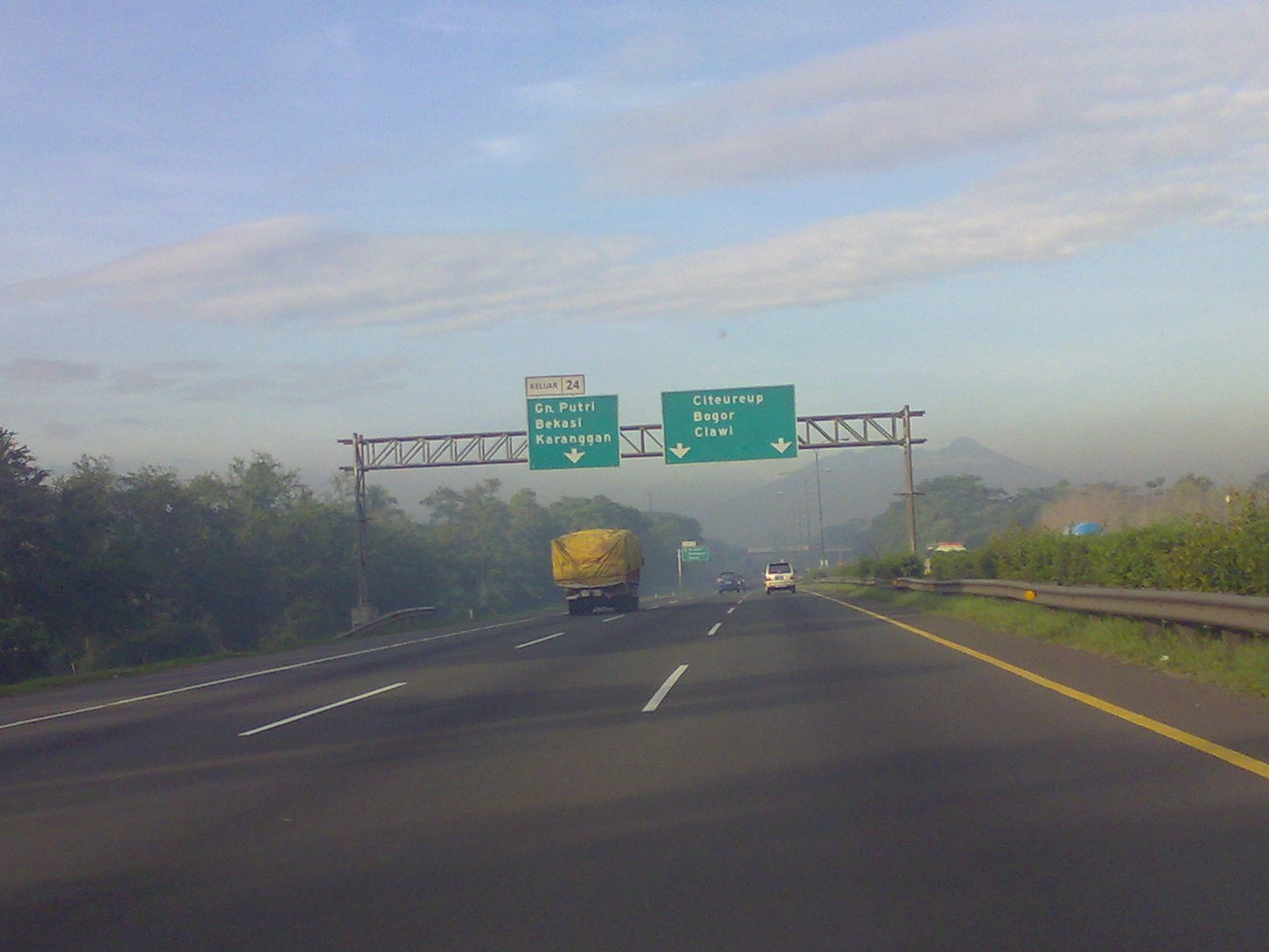
Jagorawi Toll Road built during the second Repelita

One of the major policies implemented during Repelita II was the transmigration program. This program involved the relocation of people from Java, Bali, and Madura to the islands of Sumatra, Kalimantan, and Sulawesi. The main aim of the program was to reduce the population density in Java and to promote national integration.

In the transportation sector, many projects were undertaken during the period. Some of the projects included the construction of the Jagorawi Toll Road, which connected the cities of Jakarta, Bogor, and Ciawi.

The communications sector developed the Palapa satellite system, which enabled domestic telecommunications coverage across the archipelago.

The government assessed that Repelita II had been successfully implemented, even surpassing some of the targets they had set out. The rate of economic growth was sustained, infrastructure development was expanded, and social progress was achieved.

=== Repelita III (1979-1984) ===
The third Five-Year Development Plan, Repelita III, began on 1 April 1979 and ended on 31 March 1984. This plan was conceptually different from all the earlier plans as it had a marked emphasis on the equitable distribution of the fruits of development, as opposed to development for its own sake.

The ideological basis for Repelita III is set out in the Development Trilogy, albeit with a different set of priorities, with equity taking precedence over rapid development. This is expressed in the formulation of the Eight Pathways of Equity, which are:

1. Equity in the fulfillment of basic needs, particularly food, clothing, and housing.
2. Equity in access to education and health services.
3. Equity in income distribution.
4. Equity in employment opportunities.
5. Equity in business opportunities.
6. Equity in opportunities for participation in development, especially for youth and women.
7. Equity in the geographic distribution of development across the archipelago.
8. Equity in access to justice.

There was a recognition on the part of the government that, despite the fast rate of economic growth during the initial two Repelita periods, the benefits of growth were not equally shared by all regions and people.

A significant share of development expenditure was spent in the rural areas. The program provided direct aid from the central government to villages to finance village development projects. Road construction programs were expanded to the sub-district and village levels to improve connectivity between rural communities and markets.

In terms of agriculture, the government continued to increase rice production. The results of these efforts were realized in 1984, when Indonesia was declared to have achieved self-sufficiency in rice production and ceased to be the world's largest rice importer.

With respect to health, the government aimed at improving health services. These efforts included the eradication of infectious diseases, improving nutrition and sanitation, protecting society from drug dangers, ensuring equitable distribution of medicine, and providing medical and paramedical personnel.

At the end of Repelita III, with declining oil prices, the government was compelled to review its heavy reliance on oil revenues. In June 1983, the government introduced a major deregulation package, which became known as the June 1983 Package (Pakjun 1983). The June Package comprised major reforms to the financial system, including the reduction of subsidized credit programs and the relaxation of controls on state banks. This was the beginning of a gradual shift to non-oil exports and private sector growth.

The government assessed Repelita III as having been successful in achieving its main objectives in terms of equity. Rice self-sufficiency, which was achieved in 1984, was considered the most important achievement of Repelita III.

=== Repelita IV (1984-1989) ===
Repelita IV started on 1 April 1984 and concluded on 31 March 1989. The plan was formulated following Indonesia's achievement of rice self-sufficiency in 1984, which permitted a reorientation of development priorities.

During Repelita IV, for the first time, the industrial sector surpassed both the agricultural and mining sectors in terms of contribution to government revenue.

The main goal of Repelita IV was to strengthen the industrial sector, particularly labor-intensive industries and the production of capital goods, including machinery. In order to support this industrialization drive and to maintain quality standards, the government introduced the Indonesian National Standard (Standar Industri Indonesia, or SII), which was aimed at protecting consumers and improving industrial efficiency.

During Repelita IV, a global economic recession occurred. In response, the government implemented a series of policies and adjustments beginning in 1984. These included budgetary austerity measures, gradual currency devaluation, administrative reform of development institutions, provision of incentives to encourage non-oil and gas exports, and efforts to increase the competitiveness of domestic industry.

=== Repelita V (1989-1994) ===
Repelita V, the fifth Five-Year Development Plan, began on 1 April 1989 and ended on 31 March 1994. The plan was the final installment of the first 25-year Long-Term Development phase (PJP I, 1969–1994).

The government focused on four primary objectives: consolidating food self-sufficiency, increasing agricultural production, absorbing the existing workforce, and developing domestic capability to manufacture industrial machinery.

Economic growth reached 6.8 percent during this period.

=== Repelita VI (1994-incomplete) ===
Repelita VI, the sixth Five-Year Development Plan, began on 1 April 1994. This was the final Repelita program of the New Order era. The primary target of Repelita VI was to increase economic growth to above 7 percent.

The government's policies during this period were aimed at continuing the deregulation of the economy to improve the efficiency of the economy and promote exports of non-oil and gas products. Other policies were aimed at fostering a more balanced economy by developing medium and small-scale industries and enterprises.

Repelita VI was the first plan of a projected second 25-year Long-Term Development phase (PJP II), which was intended to last from 1994 until 2019.

The plan was not completed. The 1997 Asian financial crisis disrupted the Indonesian economy, and Repelita VI was terminated prior to its scheduled conclusion on 31 March 1999.
