= Five-Year Plans of Bangladesh =

Series of national economic plans of the government of Bangladesh

- বাংলাদেশের পঞ্চবার্ষিক পরিকল্পনা

Agency overview
- Formed: 1973
- Jurisdiction: Government of Bangladesh
- Agency executive: Muhammad Yunus (Chief Adviser)
- Parent department: Bangladesh Planning Commission

The Five-Year Plans of Bangladesh are a series of five-year economic plans designed to guide future socioeconomic activities and the development of Bangladesh in alignment with Government objectives over a specific period. After the establishment of the Bangladesh Planning Commission in 1972, the commission took responsibility for formulating and implementing the Five-Year Plans, the first of which was formulated in 1973.

== History ==
The concept of general Five-Year Plans was initially developed by Joseph Stalin who first implemented a Five-Year Plan within the then Soviet Union in 1928. Since then, countries began to formulate development plans with the aim of changing and improving their socio-economic infrastructure. Before the Liberation War, during Pakistan's rule of Bangladesh (1947–1971), several development plans were adopted. Under the Colombo Plan, Pakistan undertook its first six-year plan (1951–1957), which began in 1951. However, before its completion, the first Five-Year Plan was initiated in 1955. Following that, the second Five-Year Plan was adopted from 1960 to 1965, and the third Five-Year Plan from 1965 to 1970. Through these plans, development took place in then-West Pakistan, while East Pakistan—present-day Bangladesh—saw virtually no significant economic changes. After the Liberation War, starting with the establishment of the Planning Commission on January 31, 1972, the development planning process expanded for economic reconstruction and development. Consequently, the first Five-Year Plan (1973–1978) was adopted. As of 2025, the government has formulated eight Five-Year Plans.

== First Five-Year Plan (1973–1978) ==
The First Five-Year Plan was formulated with the goal of establishing economic justice in Bangladesh. The objectives and targets of the plan were determined based on the state's four fundamental principles—democracy, socialism, secularism, and nationalism—as well as the need to eliminate poverty and unemployment and to rebuild the war-torn economy.

=== Objectives and goals ===
The main objective of the First Five-Year Plan was to design a development strategy considering the geographical features, strategic location, underdeveloped infrastructure, stagnant agricultural conditions, and rapidly growing population of Bangladesh, aiming to improve their socio-economic status.

- Alleviation of poverty
- Management of the key economic sectors, agriculture and industry, to be brought up to the 1969-70 level
- Increase Gross Domestic Product (GDP) at a rate of 5.5%
- Raise per capita income at an average rate of 2.5%
- Reduce the birth rate from 3.0% to 2.8%

This target for GDP growth was primarily set with the aim of utilizing the capital achieved through agricultural development and the expansion of small- and large-scale industries. Overall, the plan aimed to make a war-ravaged country self-reliant in political, economic, social, and religious aspects.

== Second Five-Year Plan (1980–1985) ==
After the conclusion of the First Five-Year Plan, a two-year interim plan was adopted for the period from 1978 to 1980 instead of immediately initiating the Second Five-Year Plan. After the interim plan, the government launched the Second Five-Year Plan in July 1980. The total size of the plan was set at 25,595 crore taka, with 20,215 crore taka allocated to the public sector and 5,475 crore taka to the private sector. However, due to lower-than-expected domestic resource mobilization and a decline in foreign aid, the size and allocation of the plan were later revised. Based on the recommendations of the Bangladesh Planning Commission, in November 1982 the total expenditure of the Second Five-Year Plan was re-estimated. The revised plan allocated a total of 17,200 crore taka, with 11,100 crore for the public sector and 6,100 crore for the private sector. Of this, it was estimated that 9,500 crore would come from domestic sources and 7,700 crore from foreign aid and investment. The rate of foreign assistance in the plan was projected at 58 percent.

=== Objectives and goals ===
The main objectives of this plan were to increase GDP at an annual rate of 5.4%, reduce the population growth rate from 2.80% to 2.23%, and increase per capita income at an annual rate of 3.5%. By 1984–85, the target for food production was set at 17.5 million metric tons.

- Prioritizing improvement of standards of living for the rural population
- Elimination of illiteracy
- Achieving self-reliance
- Establishing social justice
- Increasing food production to attain self-sufficiency
- Achieving a growth rate of 5.0% in agriculture and 8.4% in industry
- Setting the national savings target at 7.16% of gross domestic product by 1980–85
  - Agricultural Emphasis: Prioritized increasing food production through improved irrigation facilities, promotion of high-yielding varieties, and expanding rural credit access.
  - Industrial Diversification: Sought to move beyond traditional jute exports by developing new industries like textiles, leather goods, and light engineering to boost export earnings.
  - Infrastructure Development: Focused on improving transportation networks by expanding roads, waterways, and power generation capacity to facilitate economic activity.
  - Social Sector Focus: Included programs for primary education, healthcare, and family planning to improve human capital development. Challenges faced during the Second Five Year Plan:
  - Frequent Natural Disasters: Frequent floods and cyclones disrupted development efforts and required significant resources for relief and rehabilitation.
  - Foreign Aid Dependency: The plan heavily relied on foreign aid, which was susceptible to fluctuations in donor commitments.
  - Political Instability: Political turmoil during the period could have impacted policy implementation and investment decisions.

== Third Five-Year Plan (1985–1990) ==
In the Third Five-Year Plan, a total expenditure of Tk. 38,600 crore was allocated. Of this, Tk. 25,000 crore was allocated to the public sector and Tk. 13,600 crore to the private sector. Out of the total expenditure, it was estimated that Tk. 17,572 crore would come from domestic resources, including Tk. 5,960 crore from public savings, Tk. 11,612 crore from private savings, and Tk. 21,028 crore from foreign aid. The dependence on foreign loans was estimated at 54.5 percent.

=== Goals and objectives ===
- The main goal of this plan was to increase GDP by 5.4 percent annually, reduce the population growth rate to 1.8 percent, and raise per capita income by 3.5 percent annually.
- The target for food production was set at 20.7 million metric tons by 1989–90.

==== Additional objectives ====
- Creation of production-oriented employment;
- Ensuring universal primary education;
- Setting average annual growth at 5.4%;
- Sectoral growth targets: Agriculture at 4%, Industry at 10.1%, Power and Gas at 9.6%, Construction at 4.9%, Transport at 6.9%, and Other sectors at 5.8%;
- Creating 5.1 million additional jobs, bringing total employment to 24.4 million people;
- Setting national savings at 10% of GDP;
- Setting national tax share at 10.3%;
- Increasing export volume by 5.9%.

== Fourth Five-Year Plan (1990–1995) ==
Due to structural flaws in Bangladesh's Third Five-Year Plan, most targets were not achieved. Therefore, to bring about structural changes in the economy, a long-term perspective plan for 1990–2010 was formulated. The Fourth Five-Year Plan was designed as part of this long-term plan.

The size of the Fourth Five-Year Plan was determined at Tk. 62,000 crore. Of this, Tk. 34,700 crore was allocated to the public sector and Tk. 27,300 crore to the private sector. It was estimated that Tk. 34,550 crore would be sourced from domestic resources and Tk. 27,450 crore from foreign aid. The dependency on foreign aid was approximately 44 percent.

=== Goals and objectives ===
- The primary objective of this plan was to ensure universal primary education.
- At the beginning of 1990, the Primary Education (Compulsory) Act was passed.
- Later, in 1992, compulsory primary education was initially implemented on a pilot basis in one thana (sub-district) per district. From 1993, it was expanded nationwide.
- Under this act, six types of committees were formed: a national-level committee, district committee, thana committee, union committee, ward committee in urban areas, and ward committee in rural areas.

==== Additional objectives ====
- Creation of self-employment through canal excavation, afforestation, vegetable cultivation, farming, and beekeeping;
- Sectoral growth targets: Agriculture at 3.42%, Industry at 9.02%, Power, Gas, and Natural Resources at 9.28%, Construction at 5.86%, Communication and Transport at 5.39%, Housing at 3.62%, Public Services at 10.56%, and Other Services at 5.0%;
- Initiatives for development in underdeveloped areas;
- Promotion of an export-oriented industrial sector;
- Transformation of the economic infrastructure through indigenous technology.

== Fifth Five-Year Plan (1997–2002) ==
A total expenditure of Tk. 1,960 billion was allocated in the Fifth Five-Year Plan. Of this, Tk. 860 billion was allocated to the public sector and Tk. 1,100 billion to the private sector. Of the total expenditure, Tk. 1,520 billion was expected to come from domestic resources, and Tk. 440 billion from foreign aid.

=== Goals and objectives ===
The main goals of this plan were to increase GDP at a rate of 7.0 percent, reduce the population growth rate to 1.2 percent, increase per capita income by 5.5 percent annually, and bring at least 50 percent of the population above the poverty line.

During this plan, Bangladesh achieved self-sufficiency in food for the first time in the fiscal year 1997–98.

- Increasing productivity through a combination of traditional labour-intensive and new capital-intensive technologies
- Improving the standard of living of the rural population;
- Emphasizing electronic and genetic engineering;
- Developing rural socio-economic infrastructure;
- Reducing the gender gap in economic activities;
- Eliminating economic disparities among different population groups.

== Sixth Five-Year Plan (2011–2015) ==
From 2002 to 2009–10, no five-year plan was adopted in Bangladesh. During this period, Bangladesh followed the World Bank-promoted Poverty Reduction Strategy Paper (PRSP).

Accordingly, in March 2003, Bangladesh formulated its first interim strategy paper titled Strategy for Economic Growth, Poverty Reduction, and Social Development. Later, based on this interim paper, a more comprehensive and expanded strategy was developed in October 2005. This strategy paper became widely known as the PRSP. When the government changed, this strategy lost its status. In 2011, the Sixth Five-Year Plan was formulated.

The total size of the Sixth Five-Year Plan was determined to be Tk. 13,469.4 billion. Of this, Tk. 3,075.8 billion was allocated to the public sector and Tk. 10,393.6 billion to the private sector. It was estimated that Tk. 12,215.3 billion would come from domestic sources and Tk. 1,254.1 billion from foreign aid. The dependency on foreign aid was 9.3 percent.

=== Goals and objectives ===
The main goal of this plan was the implementation of the Digital Bangladesh vision. Accordingly, on November 11, 2011, a total of 4,501 Union Information and Service Centers (UDCs) were inaugurated across the country to provide easy, fast, and low-cost government services to people’s doorsteps. Additionally, the plan aimed to increase electricity production to 15,200 megawatts by 2015, bringing 65 percent of the country under electricity coverage. The goal was also set to reduce the poverty rate from 31.5 percent to 22 percent by 2015. There was a target to achieve an average annual growth rate of 7.3 percent, and to increase GDP growth to 8 percent by the fiscal year 2014–15.

- Accelerating economic growth;
- Eliminating distributional inequality;
- Investment in small and medium enterprises;
- Ensuring food security under national investment programs;
- Aligning with Millennium Development Goals;
- Strengthening reproductive healthcare services;
- Above all, implementing Vision 2021 was a major part of this plan.

== Seventh Five-Year Plan (2016–2020) ==
With the theme of "Accelerating Growth, Empowering Citizens," the Seventh Five-Year Plan was adopted on October 20, 2015. To implement the Seventh Five-Year Plan, the size was set at 31,902.8 billion taka. Out of this, 7,252.3 billion taka was allocated to the public sector and 24,650.5 billion taka to the private sector. It was estimated that 28,851 billion taka would be collected from domestic sources and 3,052 billion taka from foreign aid. The dependency rate on foreign aid was 9.6 percent.

=== Goals and objectives ===
One of the main objectives of this plan was to transition from an agriculture-based economy to an industrial economy and to pave the way for becoming a middle-income country. Other targets of the plan included raising GDP growth to 8 percent, eradicating poverty, developing human resources, ensuring energy and food security, and transforming Bangladesh into a middle-income country. Significant among the main plans were: raising the primary education rate to 100 percent and education up to twelfth grade to 60 percent, reducing the population growth rate to 1 percent, bringing down the poverty rate to 18.60 percent, reducing the extreme poverty rate to 8.9 percent, and increasing average life expectancy to 72 years. Among these, the literacy rate increased to 73 percent. The dropout rate in primary education came down to 20.9 percent. Enrollment rate in grades six to eight rose to 62 percent, enrollment in grades eleven and twelve increased to 44 percent, and enrollment in colleges, universities, and technical education rose to 10 percent. Under this plan, a project worth 65 billion taka was also included for improving educational infrastructure and the quality of science education.

- Introduction of a secular democratic system of governance
- Sustainable human development planning
- Ensuring telephone and broadband services
- Accessibility to safe drinking water
- Establishment of inclusive, transparent, and accountable governance
- Environmental conservation

== Eighth Five-Year Plan (2020–2025) ==
With the theme of "Towards Prosperity for All," the Eighth Five-Year Plan was adopted on December 2, 2020. To implement the Eighth Five-Year Plan, the size was set at 64,959.8 billion taka. Of this, 12,301.2 billion taka was allocated to the public sector and 52,658.6 billion taka to the private sector. It was estimated that 57,489.4 billion taka would be collected from domestic sources and 7,470.4 billion taka from foreign aid. The dependency rate on foreign aid was 11.5 percent.

=== Goals and objectives ===
The main goal of this plan is employment generation. A target of creating 11.6 million jobs was set. Of these, 8.17 million jobs would be created domestically, and the remaining 3.5 million abroad. The plan was formulated with targets to create 2.16 million jobs in 2021, 2.23 million in 2022, 2.33 million in 2023, 2.42 million in 2024, and 2.53 million in 2025. Additionally, due to the economic disruption caused by COVID-19, the GDP growth target was raised to 8.51 percent. During the COVID-19 period, a stimulus package worth 1,192.4 billion taka was implemented, aimed solely at alleviating short-term unemployment. At the same time, in alignment with Vision 2041, plans were adopted to bring export income to 300 billion dollars through the establishment of export processing zones and economic zones. Among the 104 indicators of the UN-sponsored Sustainable Development Goals-based Development Results Framework, 66 indicators were included in this plan. However, allocations for the education and health sectors were reduced in this plan—nearly 5 percent lower than the previous plan.

- Creating opportunities for sending workers abroad from lagging districts as a priority
- Overall inflation set at 5.5%, to gradually decline to 4.8% by the fiscal year 2024–25
- Reducing the poverty rate to 15.6%
- Elevating Bangladesh to a middle-income country by 2031
- Formulating a roadmap for sustainable development
- Investment target set at 37.40% of gross domestic product.
