= Five-year plan =

Quinquennial centralized economic plan

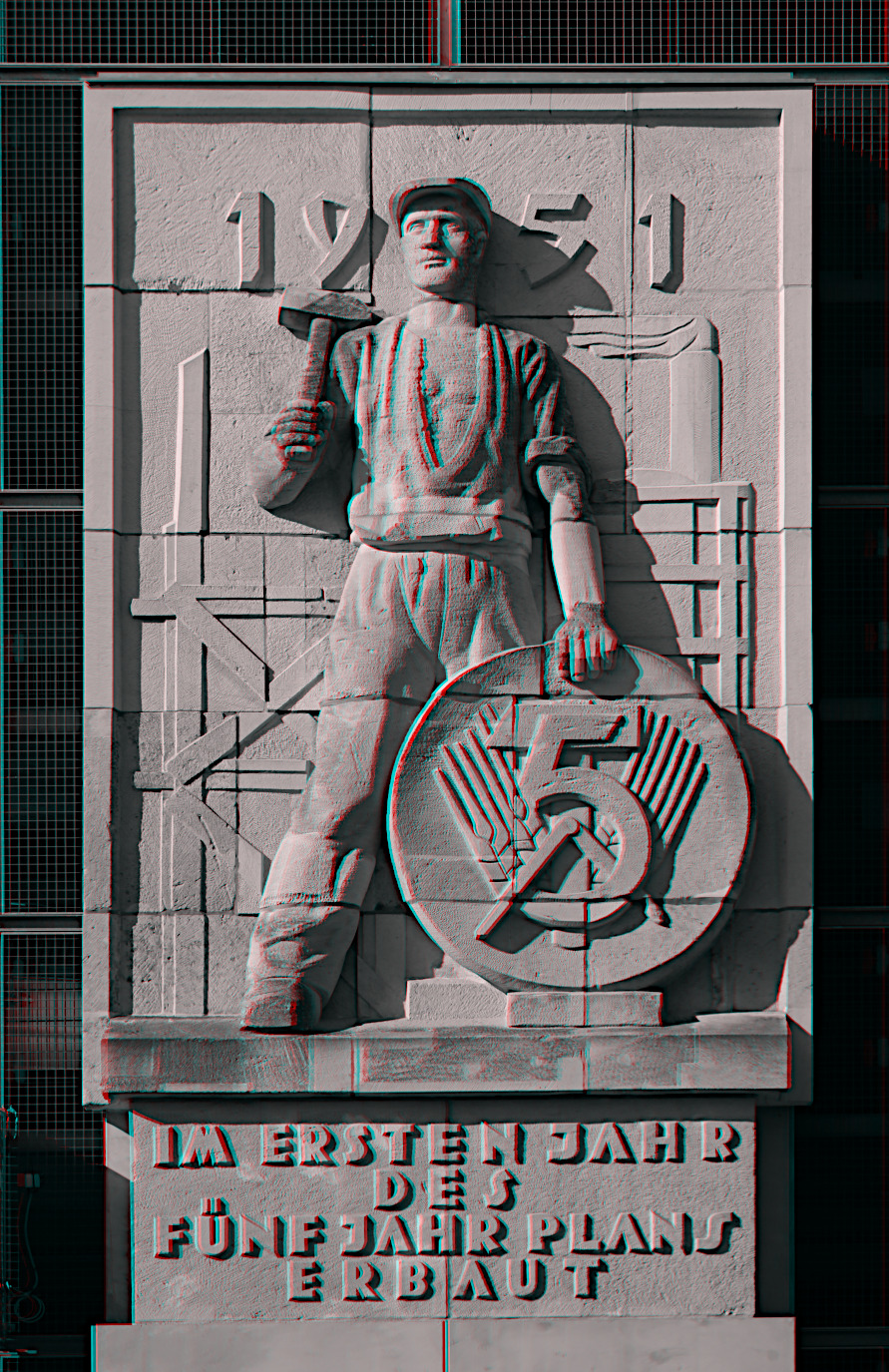
Workers' Five-Year Plan by Max Piroch, created in Dresden, East Germany in 1951

A five-year plan (FYP) is a type of economic development initiative originating in the Soviet Union in 1928 and later adopted by many other countries. In each five year plan, the plans for all sectors of the economy are synchronized for a period of five years. As centralized and integrated national programs, five-year plans have been adopted by most communist states and also many capitalist states. The effectiveness of five-year plans are measured against several performance indicators, such as real national income and per capita income, with set economic targets expected to be fulfilled during and at the end of such plans.

== Five-year plans by country ==
- Five-year plans of the Soviet Union, a series of nationwide centralized economic plans in the Soviet Union
- Five-Year Plans of Argentina, under Peron (1946–1955)
- Five-Year Plans of Bangladesh, ongoing socioeconomic development plans since 1973
- Five-Year Plans of Bhutan, a series of national economic development plans created by the government of Bhutan since 1961
- Five-year plans of China (PRC), a series of social and economic development initiatives
  - Five‑Year Plan (Hong Kong)
- Five-Year Plans of Ethiopia
- Five-Year Plans of India, which existed from 1947 to 2017
- Five-Year Development Plans of Indonesia existed from 1969 to 1998
- Five-Year Plans of Nepal
- Five-Year Plans of Pakistan, centralized economic plans and targets as part of economic development initiatives
- Five-Year Plans of Romania, economic development projects in Communist Romania, largely inspired by the Soviet model
- Five-Year Plans of South Korea, a series of economic development plans by South Korea from 1962 to 1996
- Five-Year Plans of Vietnam, a series of economic development initiatives
- Five-year plans of the Ba'athist Syria, economic planning system in Ba'athist Syria
- Five-year plan of Yugoslavia, which existed from 1946 to 1951
- First Malayan Five-Year Plan, the first economic development plan launched by the Malayan government, just before independence in 1957, and its successors, the ongoing Malaysia Plans

== See also ==
- Four Year Plan, a series of economic reforms in Nazi Germany
- Five-year Plan to Control the Aborigines, Japanese military plan
- Economic development
- Economic planning
- Planned economy
