= Five-Year Plans of Vietnam =

Series of national economic development plans

The Five-Year Plans of Vietnam are central economic guidelines laid out by the Communist Party of Vietnam (CPV) shaping the Vietnamese economy. The CPV produces and evaluates the plans in plenary sessions of the Central Committee and National Congresses which have been held every five years since 1976 (50 years ago), right after the Socialist Republic was founded. The first ever plan (1961–1965) only affected the communist North Vietnam and implemented in the midst of the Vietnam War. The plans are used to map strategies for economic development, set growth targets, and launch reforms, such as the Đổi Mới in 1986 (introduced with the fourth Five-Year Plan).

Planning is a key characteristic of centralized, planned economy, and one plan established for the entire country normally contains detailed economic development guidelines for all its regions. According to Vietnamese economist Vo Nhan Tri, Vietnam's post-reunification economy was in a "period of transition to socialism". The process was described as consisting of three phases. The first phase, from 1976 through 1980, incorporated the Second Five-Year Plan (1976–80)—the First Five-Year Plan (1960–65) applied to North Vietnam only. The second phase, called "socialist industrialization", was divided into two stages: from 1981 through 1990 and from 1991 through 2005. The third phase, covering the years 2006 through 2010, was to be time allotted to "perfect" the transition.

The party's goal is to unify the economic system of the entire country under socialism. Steps were taken to implement this goal at the long-delayed Fourth National Party Congress, convened in December 1976, when the party adopted the Second Five-Year Plan and defined both its "line of socialist revolution" and its "line of building a socialist economy". The next two congresses, held in March 1982 and December 1986, respectively, reiterated this long-term communist objective and approved the five-year plans designed to guide the development of the Vietnamese economy at each specific stage of the revolution.

The 2017 Planning Law unified the over 19,000 local plans along the lines of a national hierarchy. It was amended in 2024.

The five year plans are informed by long term economic planning. One of the larger scope goals of Vietnam is ascendancy to developed nation status by 2045.

== The first Five-Year Plan (1961–1965) ==
The first North Vietnamese Five-Year Plan contained a provision for relocating people from the overpopulated provinces (Red River Delta) to the "underpopulated" provinces of the delta's mountain rim. Because of the ambitiousness of its original goal the Northern program did not reach its objective. The objective being to resettle each year a number of people corresponding to the increase of population. Between 1961 and 1975 no more than one million people were moved, whilst the population grew by 8 million people.

== The second Five-Year Plan (1976–80) ==
The optimism and impatience of Vietnam's leaders were evident in the Second Five-Year Plan. The plan set extraordinarily high goals for the average annual growth rates for industry (16 to 18 percent), agriculture (8 to 10 percent), and national income (13 to 14 percent). It also gave priority to reconstruction and new construction while attempting to develop agricultural resources, to integrate the North and the South, and to proceed with communization.

Twenty years were allowed to construct the material and technical bases of communism. In the South, material construction and systemic transformation were to be combined in order to hasten economic integration with the North. It was considered critical for the VCP to improve and extend its involvement in economic affairs so that it could guide this process. Development plans were to focus equally on agriculture and industry, while initial investment was to favor projects that developed both sectors of the economy. Thus, for example, heavy industry was intended to serve agriculture on the premise that a rapid increase in agricultural production would in turn fund further industrial growth. With this strategy, Vietnamese leaders claimed that the country could bypass the capitalist industrialization stage necessary to prepare for communism.

Vietnam was incapable, however, of undertaking such an ambitious program on its own and solicited financial support for its Second Five-Year Plan from Western nations, international organizations, and communist allies. Although the amount of economic aid requested is not known, some idea of the assistance level envisioned by Hanoi can be obtained from available financial data. The Vietnamese government budget for 1976 amounted to US$2.5 billion, while investments amounting to US$7.5 billion were planned for the period between 1976 and 1980.

The economic aid tendered to Hanoi was substantial, but it still fell short of requirements. The Soviet Union, China, and Eastern Europe offered assistance that was probably worth US$3 billion to US$4 billion, and countries of the Western economic community pledged roughly US$1 billion to US$1.5 billion.

== The third Five Year Plan (1981–85) ==
By 1979 it was clear that the Second Five-Year Plan had failed to reduce the serious problems facing the newly unified economy. Vietnam's economy remained dominated by small-scale production, low labor productivity, unemployment, material and technological shortfalls, and insufficient food and consumer goods.

To address these problems, at its Fifth National Party Congress held in March 1982, the VCP approved resolutions on "orientations, tasks and objectives of economic and social development for 1981-85 and the 1980s". The resolutions established economic goals and in effect constituted Vietnam's Third Five-Year Plan (1981–85). Because of the failure of the Second Five-Year Plan, however, the Vietnamese leadership proceeded cautiously, presenting the plan one year at a time. The plan as a whole was neither drawn up in final form nor presented to the National Assembly of Vietnam for adoption.

The economic policies set forth in 1982 resulted from a compromise between ideological and pragmatic elements within the party leadership. The question of whether or not to preserve private capitalist activities in the South was addressed, as was the issue of the pace of the South's socialist transformation. The policies arrived at called for the temporary retention of private capitalist activities in order to spur economic growth and the completion, more or less, of a communist transformation in the South by the mid-1980s.

The plan's highest priority, however, was to develop agriculture by integrating the collective and individual sectors into an overall system emphasizing intensive cultivation and crop specialization and by employing science and technology. Economic policy encouraged the development of the "family economy"; that is, the peasants' personal use of economic resources, including land, not being used by the cooperative. Through use of an end-product contract system introduced by the plan, peasant households were permitted to sign contracts with the collective to farm land owned by the collective. The households then assumed responsibility for production on the plots. If production fell short of assigned quotas, the households were to be required to make up the deficit the following year. If a surplus was produced, the households were to be allowed to keep it, sell it on the free market, or sell it to the state for a "negotiated price". In 1983 the family economy reportedly supplied 50 to 60 percent of the peasants' total income and 30 to 50 percent of their foodstuffs.

Free enterprise was sanctioned, thus bringing to an end the nationalization of small enterprises and reversing former policies that had sought the complete and immediate communization of the South. The new policy especially benefited peasants (including the overwhelming majority of peasants in the South) who had refused to join cooperatives, small producers, small traders, and family businesses.

The effort to reduce the capitalist sector in the South nevertheless continued. Late in 1983, a number of import-export firms that had been created in Ho Chi Minh City to spur the development of the export market were integrated into a single enterprise regulated by the state. At the same time, the pace of collectivization in the countryside was accelerated under the plan. By the end of 1985, Hanoi reported that 72 percent of the total number of peasant households in the South were enrolled in some form of cooperative organization.

Despite the plan's emphasis on agricultural development, the industrial sector received a larger share of state investment during the first two years. In 1982, for example, the approximate proportion was 53 percent for industry compared with 18 percent for agriculture. Limiting state investment in agriculture, however, did not appear to affect total food production, which increased 19.5 percent from 1980 to 1984.

The plan also stressed the development of small-scale industry to meet Vietnam's material needs, create goods for export, and lay the foundation for the development of heavy industry. In the South, this entailed transforming some private enterprises into "state-private joint enterprises" and reorganizing some small-scale industries into cooperatives. In other cases, however, individual ownership was maintained. Investment in light industry actually decreased by 48 percent while investment in heavy industry increased by 17 percent during the first two years of the plan. Nonetheless, the increase in light-industry production outpaced that of heavy industry by 33 percent to 28 percent during the same two-year period.

The July 1984 Sixth Plenum (Fifth Congress) of the VCP Central Committee recognized that private sector domination of wholesale and retail trade in the South could not be eliminated until the state was capable of assuming responsibility for trade. Proposals therefore were made to decentralize planning procedures and improve the managerial skills of government and party officials.

These plans were subsequently advanced at the Central Committee's Eighth Plenum (Fifth Congress) in June 1985. Acting to disperse economic decision making, the plenum resolved to grant production autonomy at the factory and individual farm levels. The plenum also sought to reduce government expenditures by ending state subsidies on food and certain consumer goods for state employees. It further determined that all relevant costs to the national government needed to be accounted for in determining production costs and that the state should cease compensating for losses incurred by state enterprises. To implement these resolutions, monetary organizations were required to shift to modern economic accounting. The government created a new dong in September 1985, and set maximum quotas for the amount permitted to be exchanged in bank notes. The dong also was officially devalued.

== The eighth Five-Year Plan (2006–10) ==
The Eighth Five-Year Plan contained targets split into 3 high-level categories: Economic, Social, and Environmental as well as a list of 15 "Major tasks and solutions."

== The ninth Five-Year Plan (2011–15) ==
The CPV set GDP target growth to 6.5% to 7%. The plan also aimed to provide 8 million new jobs and reduce the unemployment rate in urban areas to less than 4%.

== The eleventh Five-Year Plan (2021–2025) ==
In 2021 the CPV again set a target economic growth of 6.5% to 7% and a GDP per capita of $4,700 to $5,000.

Between 2021 and 2024 the Vietnamese economy grew by an annual average of 5.7 percent, but with the help of a strong 2025 (8% growth) reached an average of 6.3% for the period of the eleventh plan, narrowly missing the target rate. The GDP per capita of 2025 reached $5,066.

== The twelfth Five-Year Plan (2026–2030) ==
In its twelfth Five-Year Plan the CPV set a target economic (GDP) growth of 10% per year and to raise the GDP per capita (from $5,115 in 2026) to $8,500 by 2030. The plan puts special focus on infrastructure projects (such as the North–South express railway) and digital economy. According to the plan, the latter should account for 30% of the national GDP by 2030. Planned international financial centers were announced in Da Nang and Ho Chi Minh City as well as "new-generation free trade zones" in major cities such as Da Nang and Hai Phong.

== See also ==
- Five-year plan in general
- Five Year Plans of China
- Five Year Plans of The Soviet Union
