= Five-Year Plans of Romania =

Series of national economic development plans

The Five-Year Plans of Romania (Cincinal in Romanian, plural Cincinale) were economic development projects in Communist Romania, largely inspired by the Soviet model. Starting from 1951, there were 8 five-year plans.

== Origins ==
In 1948, the Communists had fully taken over the power in Romania and started to nationalize property and means of production. They began economic development and industrialization by adopting the Soviet concept of five-year plans that set a number of goals to fulfill by the end of the terms. The first five-year plan started out in 1951.

== Five-Year Plans ==
=== 1951–1955 ===
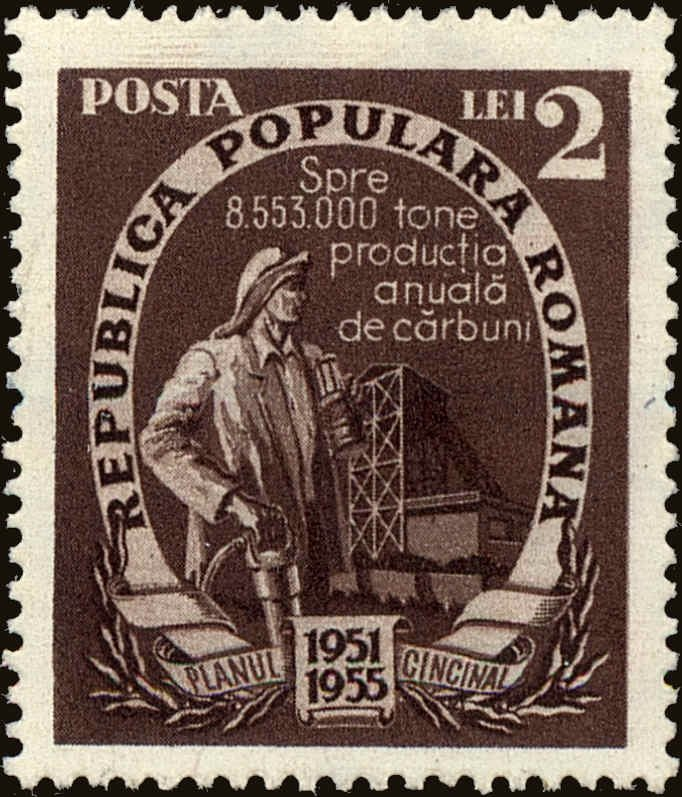
Stamp of Romania from 1951: Five-Year Plan 1951 to 1955 – Coal production

The first five-year plan took place between the years 1951 and 1955. Some of the 5 year plans are recorded on the countries postal stamp issues. They included:

- The move to save and or stabilise the forests that had trees older than 200 years.
- The reorganisation of farming and its efficiency.
- Industrialisation.

The five-year plan was adopted by the Great National Assembly on December 15, 1951. The main objective of the plan was the construction of the Danube–Black Sea Canal.

=== 1966–1970 ===
Nicolae Ceaușescu's regime gave a new impulse to industrialisation, and the accent was on developing the heavy industry. The goals of this five-year plan were allegedly attained in only four-and-a-half years; this was later used in many propaganda writings and songs.

=== 1986–1989 ===
The final five-year plan was intended to be completed in 1990. As the Communist regime ceased to exist in December 1989, the final five-year plan was cancelled and there were no subsequent five-year plans.
