= Five-Year Plans of Nepal =

Series of national economic development plans

Five-Year Plans of Nepal generally strove to increase output and employment; develop the infrastructure; attain economic stability; promote industry, commerce, and international trade; establish administrative and public service institutions to support economic development; and also introduce labor-intensive production techniques to alleviate underemployment. The social goals of the plans were improving health and education as well as encouraging equitable income distribution. Although each plan had different development priorities, the allocation of resources did not always reflect these priorities. The first four plans concentrated on infrastructure—to make it possible to facilitate the movement of goods and services—and to increase the size of the market. Each of the five-year plans depended heavily on foreign assistance in the forms of grants and loans.

== First Five-Year Plan ==
The First Five-Year Plan(1956–61) allocated Rs330 million for development expenditures of which Rs220 million were funded by international donors, partly under the Colombo Plan. Transportation received top priority with almost 30% of the budget allocation but rural development, including agriculture, village development, irrigation and forestry also received significant amounts. The first plan had four tiers of objective: production to provide employment raise living standards, establish necessary institutions and collect necessary statistic for the next plan. Before launching development plans the Nepalese economy was quite primitive and undeveloped. The first priority was given to transportation, communication and construction, the second priority to agriculture and social services and the third priority was to electricity, irrigation and drinking water.

== Second ==
After Parliament, which had been established under the 1959 constitution, was suspended in 1960, the Second Plan failed to materialize on schedule. A new plan was not introduced until 1962 and covered only three years, 1962-65. The Second Plan had expenditures of almost Rs615 million. Transportation and communication again received top priority with about 39 percent of budget expenditures. Industry, tourism, and social services were the second priority. Although targets again were missed, there were improvements in industrial production, road construction, telephone installations, irrigation, and education. However, only the organizational improvement area of the target was met.

The first two plans were developed with very little research and a minimal data base. Neither plan was detailed, and both contained only general terms. The administrative machinery with which to execute these plans also was inadequate. The National Planning Commission, which formulated the second plan, noted the difficulty of preparing plans in the absence of statistical data. Further, as was the case with the first plan, the bulk of the development budget depended on foreign aid—mostly in the form of grants. The failure of these plans was indicated by the government's inability to spend the budgeted amounts.

== Third ==
The Third Five-Year Plan(1965–70) increased the involvement of local panchayat. It also focused on transport, communications, foreign trade and industrial and agricultural development. Total planned expenditures were more than Rs1.6 billion. Its objective was also to make fair society by eliminating the social disparities. The third year plan is to make huge gap between bad society to good by starting the involvement of local panchayat and the head of society were panchayat member who can ruled the society by their own

== Fourth ==
The Fourth Five-Year Plan(1970–75) increased proposed expenditures to more than Rs3.3 billion. Transportation and communications again were the top priority, receiving 41.2 percent of expenditures, followed by agriculture, which was allocated 26 percent of the budget. Although the third and fourth plans increased the involvement of the panchayat in the development process, the central government continued to carry most of the responsibilities.

== Fifth ==
The Fifth Five-Year Plan (1975–80) proposed expenditures of more than Rs8.8 billion. For the first time, the problem of poverty was addressed in a five-year plan, although no specific goals were mentioned. Top priority was given to agricultural development, and emphasis was placed on increasing food production and cash crops such as sugar cane and tobacco. Increased industrial production and social services also were targeted. Controlling population growth was considered a priority.

== Sixth ==
The Sixth Five-Year Plan(1980–85) proposed an outlay of more than Rs 22 billion. Agriculture remained the top priority; increased social services were second. The budget share allocated to transportation and communication was less than that allocated in the previous plan; it was felt that the transportation network had reached a point where it was more beneficial to increase spending on agriculture and industry.

== Seventh ==
The Seventh Five-Year Plan(1985–90) proposed expenditures of Rs29 billion. It encouraged private sector participation in the economy (less than Rs22 billion) and local government participation (Rs2 billion). The plan targeted increasing productivity of all sectors, expanding opportunity for productive employment, and fulfilling the minimum basic needs of the people. For the first time since the plans were devised, specific goals were set for meeting basic needs. The availability of food, clothing, fuelwood, drinking water, primary health care, sanitation, primary and skillbased education, and minimum rural transport facilities was emphasized.

Because of the political upheavals in mid-1990, the new government postponed formulating the next plan. The July 1990 budget speech of the minister of finance, however, implied that for the interim, the goals of the seventh plan were being followed.

Foreign aid as a percentage of development averaged around 66 percent (see table 10, Appendix). The government continually failed to use all committed foreign aid, however, probably as a result of inefficiency. In the Rs26.6 billion budget presented in July 1991, approximately Rs11.8 billion, or 44.4 percent of the budget, was expected to be derived from foreign loans or grants.

== Eighth ==
The Eighth Plan(1992-1997) is the first plan of the democratic government formed through popular elections following the restoration of democracy brought about by the historic people's movement of 1990. In this context, the perspectives of this plan are based on two principal contradictory factors. These factors consist of, on the one hand, the positive aspects of the new aspirations and enthusiasm among the general public and, on the other, the negative aspects of the legacy of economic depravity left behind by the panchayat regime.

== Ninth ==
Ninth Year Plan(1997-2002) The main objectives of Ninth plan was poverty alleviation. The target of the ninth plan was to increase industrial production by 6% per annum the investment both domestic and foreign was estimated to be Rs. 35 billion. The plan also estimated creation of additional 0.35 million jobs. Industrial contribution to the GDP was expected to reach 14% by the end of the plan period. Many of these targets could not be achieved during the plan period.

== Tenth ==
Tenth Year Plan(2002-2007) Tenth plan also has given priority to poverty alleviation. To achieve the objective the plan has targeted to improve the economic, human and social indicators. The plan also aims to strengthen the capability of the private sector and encourage it to participate in social development activities.
