= Five-Year Plans of South Korea =

Series of economic development projects

- Hangul: 경제 사회 발전 5개년 계획
- RR: Gyeongje sahoe baljeon 5gaenyeon gyehoek
- MR: Kyŏngje sahoe palchŏn 5kaenyŏn kyehoek

The Five-Year Economic and Social Development Plans (경제 사회 발전 5개년 계획) were a series of economic development plans implemented by South Korea from the early 1960s to the late 20th century. Between 1962 and 1996, the government of South Korea formulated and implemented a total of seven five-year plans. The first four were called the Economic Development Plan, while the fifth to seventh were named the Economic and Social Development Plan to reflect the South Korean government's emphasis on both economic growth and social development.

The first four five-year economic plans had a strong "directive" nature. Starting from the fifth five-year plan, the South Korean government began to emphasize the "inductive" nature of the plan and tried to expand the participation of the private sector. The sixth five-year plan pointed out that the economic plan would play a role in the scope of a free market economy based on autonomy and competition. In addition to emphasizing "guidance", the seventh five-year plan also emphasized the "strategic" nature of the plan, which was a strategic issue for the economy jointly promoted by the government and the private sector. The Five-Year Economic Plan was a manifestation of the South Korean government's leading role in developing an export-oriented economy, and made important contributions to South Korea's economic take-off and the realization of the Miracle on the Han River.

The Economic Planning Agency was the government agency responsible for formulating and implementing five-year economic plans. When it was first established in 1961, the Economic Planning Agency was a ministerial-level national agency, which was later upgraded by half a level and headed by a deputy prime minister. The agency employed hundreds of experts in economics, law, public administration, education and other fields. It has subordinate agencies such as the Economic Planning Bureau, Budget Bureau, Price Policy Bureau, Economic Cooperation Bureau, and Survey and Statistics Bureau. It led central departments such as the Ministry of Finance, the Ministry of Trade and Industry, the Ministry for Food, Agriculture, Forestry and Fisheries, and the Ministry of Science and Technology. It played an important role in the overall development of the South Korean economy.

The President Syngman Rhee administration and the Prime Minister Chang Myon government formulated the Seven-Year Economic Development Plan (1960–1966) and the Five-Year Economic Development Plan (1961–1965) in 1960 and 1961, respectively. However, these two plans were not implemented due to the April Revolution and the May 16 Coup. The actual implementation of the five-year economic plan in South Korea was after Park Chung Hee came to power in 1963. In 1993, President Kim Young-sam announced the New Five-Year Economic Plan consistent with his term of office, replacing the Seven-Year Plan. President Kim Dae-jung discontinued the five-year economic plans.

== History ==
Both North and South Korea had survived the Korean War (1950–1953). From the end of World War II, South Korea remained largely dependent on United States. aid until a military coup occurred in 1961. American economic aid failed in its goal of creating an industrial base in South Korea largely due to corruption. While the South Koreans did not starve and were able to keep up with national defense, most of the aid was misappropriated for private use. This created a small class of wealthy Koreans at the expense of the majority of the country, generating resentment. Despite this widespread corruption however, President Syngman Rhee's administration had managed to use some U.S. aid to develop the country's education system, transportation infrastructure, and communications infrastructure.

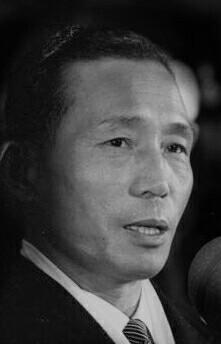
South Korean President Park Chung Hee was the architect of the Miracle on the Han River, leading South Korea's economy to take off during his term.

The earliest economic development plan of the South Korean government was the first half of the 7-Year Economic Development Plan (1960–1966) formulated by President Rhee in May 1959, namely the 3-Year Economic Development Plan. The plan was formulated by the Industrial Development Committee of the Ministry of Reconstruction, the advisory body of the Ministry of Reconstruction at that time, and was passed by the National Assembly on April 15, 1960. This economic plan was proposed in response to the continuous reduction of U.S. aid to South Korea at that time. Its direct goal was to reduce the dependence on foreign food and optimize the industrial structure through investment in the secondary industry. The most prominent feature of the plan was the development strategy of balanced growth, including balance between industry and agriculture, coordination between heavy and light industries, and balance of international payments. The Rhee administration collapsed in the April Revolution shortly after the plan was passed, meaning the plan could not be implemented.

Prime Minister Chang Myon of the Democratic Party, which came to power after the April Revolution, formulated the Five-Year Economic Development Plan (1961–1965) in early 1961 based on the economic plan of the Rhee administration, and it was discussed and approved at a cabinet meeting. Due to the contradictions between the old and new factions within the Democratic Party at that time, mass demonstrations continued one after another, and social order was chaotic. On 16 May 1961, Park Chung Hee launched the May 16 Coup and overthrew the Chang Myon government, which had only existed for eight months. The Five-Year Economic Development Plan thus became another economic plan that failed to be implemented.

The actual implementation of South Korea's five-year economic plan was after Park Chung Hee came to power. In early January 1962, President Park Chung Hee's government officially released the first five-year plan (1962–1966). Subsequently, the South Korean government formulated and implemented a total of seven five-year economic plans between 1962 and 1996. In 1993, after Kim Young-sam was elected President of South Korea, he announced the New Five-Year Economic Plan which was consistent with his term of office, replacing the Seventh Five-Year Plan and ending the historical mission of the original five-year economic plan. The later President Kim Dae-jung's government stopped formulating five-year economic plans.

== Economic Planning Institute ==
On 17 June 1948, South Korea enacted the Government Organization Law when it drafted the Constitution, which decided to establish the Planning Office directly under the Prime Minister, responsible for formulating comprehensive plans for finance, economy, banking, industry and other matters to be submitted to the State Council and for budget preparation. On 7 February 1955, South Korea revised the Government Organization Law, deciding to abolish the Planning Office and establish the Ministry of Reconstruction on August 27 of the same year. According to the newly revised Government Organization Law, "the Minister of Reconstruction is in charge of the comprehensive economic plan for reconstruction industry and the management and adjustment of its implementation."

On 26 June 1961, the Park Chung Hee government amended the Government Organization Law, abolished the Ministry of Reconstruction, and established the Ministry of Construction. "The Minister of Construction is in charge of management and adjustment matters related to the formulation and implementation of comprehensive plans required for the effective operation of the national economy." However, a month later, on 22 July, the Park Chung Hee government amended the Government Organization Law again and decided to establish the Economic Planning Institute. According to the new Government Organization Law, the Economic Planning Institute is responsible for "handling management and adjustment matters in the formulation and implementation of comprehensive plans for national economic reconstruction and development."

The Economic Planning Institute was initially formed by some relevant functional departments of the Ministry of Construction, and had 4 bureaus and 19 sections. In order to manage the affairs of national land construction, the National Land Construction Agency became the external agency of the Planning Institute. In October of the same year, the Allocation Agency also became the external agency of the Planning Institute in order to manage the purchase, supply and management of domestic and foreign investment. Initially, the Planning Agency had one director and one deputy director. However, from 14 December 1963, the Planning Institute began to establish one director and one deputy director. The director was concurrently held by the Deputy Prime Minister (at that time, the South Korean government only had one deputy prime minister).

During the administrations of Park Chung Hee and Chun Doo-hwan, the Economic Planning Agency (EPA) held great power. The Deputy Prime Minister and the EPA was often referred to as the "Economic Vice President". In the 1960s and 1970s, the EPA oversaw other economic departments by formulating economic development plans and adjusting economic policies. The EPA operated the "Ministerial Economic Council" from 1961, and later took charge of the "Monthly Economic Trends Report Meeting". It also operated many associations and adjustment agencies as chairman or speaker of the council. The Korean Government Organization Law of 1973 stipulated that the EPA was ordered by the Prime Minister to oversee the relevant departments in economic planning and operation The EPA employed hundreds of experts in economics, law, public administration, education and other fields, and played an important role in the overall development of the Korean economy.

== Five-year plans ==
=== The First Five-Year Plan (1962–1966) ===
According to South Korean economic data from 1954 to 1961, by 1957 South Korean economy had recovered from the ruins of war, and there was even a surplus in the production of some consumer goods. However, before the Park Chung Hee regime came to power, South Korean economy was still in a vicious cycle of low investment, low production and low income, and faced many serious problems such as declining economic growth rate year by year, excessive population growth, high unemployment rate, backward industrial structure, large proportion of primary industry and small proportion of secondary and tertiary industry. Whether or not the economy could be revitalized became the key to maintaining the Park Chung Hee government. "In order to resolutely correct the vicious cycle of social economy caused by the incompetence and corruption of the old regime and realize the reconstruction and self-reliant growth of the national economy," the Park Chung Hee regime officially released the First Five-Year Plan (1962–1966) in early January 1962.

Park Chung Hee's First Five-Year Plan adopted many of the contents of the Chang Myon government's economic five-year plan, advocating the implementation of a "directed capitalist system" or a "mixed economic system", advocating that the public sector should be government-led and the private sector should be guided by policies, opposing the "balanced growth" strategy of the Syngman Rhee government, advocating "unbalanced growth" centered on industrialization, and emphasizing the rapid development of the economy. The two plans did not differ much in the selection of key industries and the quantitative indicators of economic growth rate. However, there are also many differences between the two. In terms of the relationship between the government and enterprises, the Park Chung Hee government emphasized the guiding role of the government; in terms of growth and distribution, the Chang Myon government valued national welfare, while the Park Chung Hee government emphasized the "endurance" and "hard work" of the people; in terms of the relationship between industry and agriculture, the Park Chung Hee government valued industrialization and the revitalization of agriculture based on industrialization; in terms of foreign exchange, the Chang Myon government focused on foreign aid, while the Park Chung Hee government advocated earning foreign exchange through exports.

The policy priorities of the First Five-Year Plan included: developing energy industries such as electricity and coal; enhancing agricultural productivity, increasing farmers' income, and correcting the imbalance in the national economic structure; expanding the basic industries and enriching social indirect capital; making full use of idle resources, especially increasing employment, protecting and developing the land; improving the balance of payments with increasing exports as the main axis; and revitalizing technology. The First Five-Year Plan set quantitative targets for the growth of various economic sectors and formulated various policies and measures to achieve these goals.

Many problems arose during the implementation of the First Five-Year Plan. The South Korean government believed that many factors affecting economic indicators had not been taken into account at the beginning of the plan. Therefore, it supplemented and modified the original plan and issued the "Supplementary Plan" in February 1964. The supplementary plan lowered economic indicators such as the economic growth rate. For example, the average annual economic growth rate was lowered from 7.1% to 5%, the domestic total investment rate was lowered from 22.6% to 17%, the domestic total savings rate was lowered from 9.2% to 7.2%, and the overseas savings rate was lowered from 13.4% to 9.9%. However, in 1966, although some original economic indicators were not achieved, the economic growth rate reached 8.5%, which not only exceeded the supplementary plan by 3.5 percentage points, but also exceeded the original plan target by 1.4%. This greatly encouraged the Park Chung Hee government and the South Korean people.

As South Korea's first economic development plan, the First Five-Year Plan made many mistakes in its formulation and implementation, but its achievements were obvious. The economic growth rate of 8.5% marked the beginning of South Korea's economic take-off. After the First Five-Year Plan, South Korea's industrial structure underwent significant changes, with the proportion of secondary industry increasing significantly and the proportion of heavy industry in South Korea's industry greatly improving. South Korea's exports increased 3.6 times in 5 years, and the export structure was also improved, with the proportion of industrial products rising from 27.7% in 1961 to 67.5% in 1966. From the perspective of South Korea's economic development history, the greatest achievement of the First Five-Year Plan was that it found a development strategy suitable for South Korea's national conditions through exploration, which was based on government leadership, export leadership, and unbalanced development.

=== The Second Five-Year Plan (1967–1971) ===
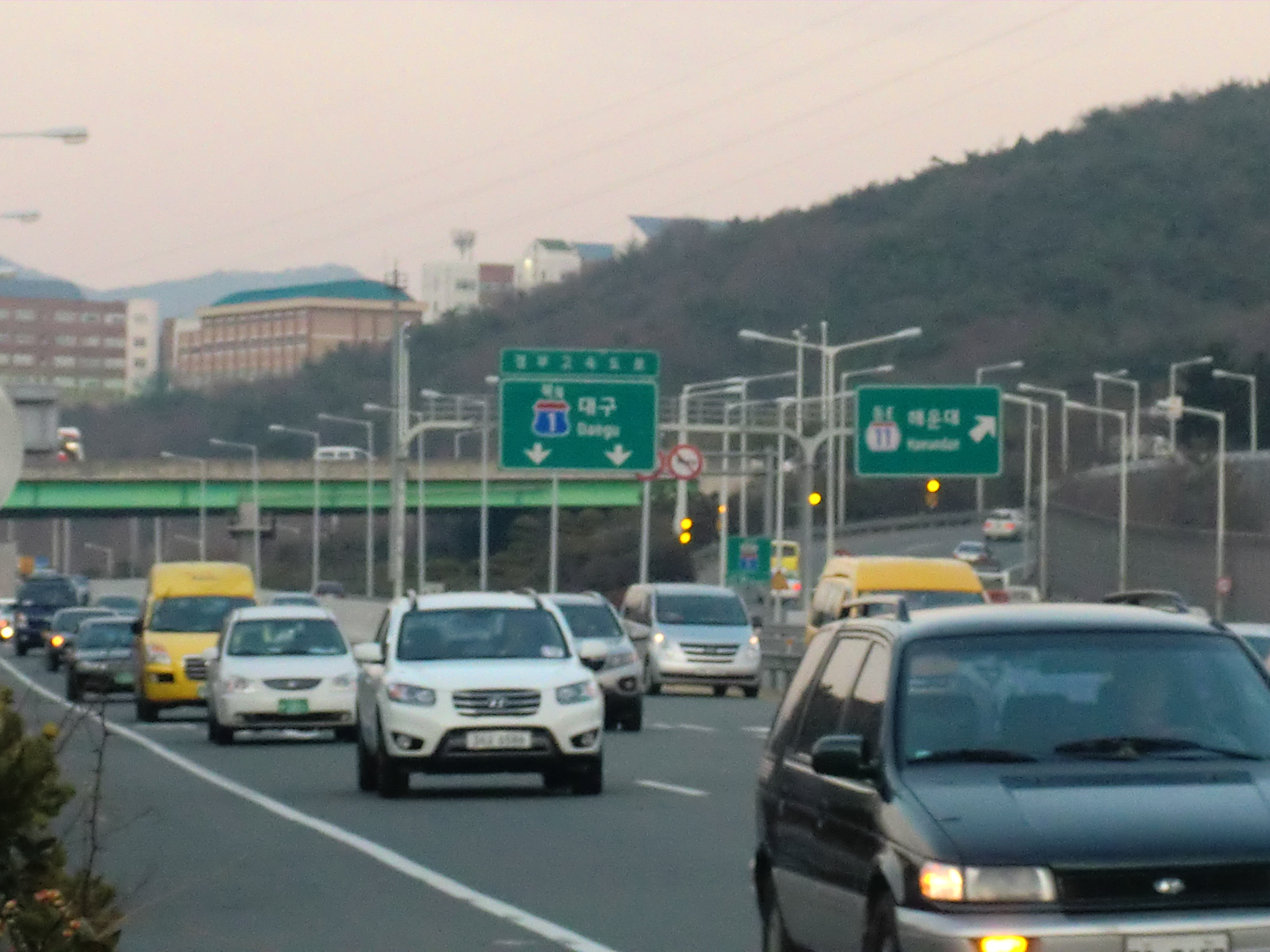
Gyeongbu Expressway

Unlike the hastily formulated First Five-Year Plan, the Second Five-Year Plan was formulated based on the implementation of the First Five-Year Plan and using various planning techniques and statistical data. It was the first economic plan in South Korean economic history to be formulated using scientific methods. The formulation of the Second Five-Year Plan began at the end of 1964 and was finally reviewed and approved at the State Council meeting on July 29, 1966. The South Korean government invested a lot of manpower and resources in the formulation of this plan. Various government departments, many research institutions, and many domestic and foreign economists participated in the formulation of the plan. The United Nations Office for International Development also sent an advisory group to South Korea to assist.

The Second Five-Year Plan was formulated at three levels: overall, departmental, and project. The determination of the total target adopted the research method of balancing the internal difference between investment and savings and the external difference between import and export. The formulation of the departmental plan adopted the input-output model. When formulating the investment project plan, industry charts were compiled and the internal investment rate of return of each industry was calculated. In the process of formulating the plan, quantitative methods such as systems analysis and operations research were adopted, including input-output model, medium-term macroeconomic model, short-term stability model, mixed integer linear programming model of steel and petrochemical sectors, and linear programming model of regional balanced development.

In addition, the Second Five-Year Plan also made a long-term plan for the economy of South Korea over the next 15 years, namely, to achieve a fully self-reliant economic system by 1981, with a modern economic foundation, including achieving a balance of payments, raising all necessary investments domestically, and achieving full employment. As a stage in achieving this long-term goal, the basic goal of the Second Five-Year Plan was set as "to modernize the industrial structure and further promote the establishment of a self-reliant economy".

The policy priorities of the Second Five-Year Plan include: (1) achieving self-sufficiency in food, promoting afforestation in mountainous areas and the development of aquatic industries. (2) building chemical, steel and machinery industries, doubling industrial production, and laying the foundation for upgrading the industrial structure. (3) achieving an export value of US$700 million, promoting import substitution, and further improving the balance of payments. (4) expanding employment and implementing family planning to curb rapid population growth. (5) significantly increasing national income, especially emphasizing diversified agricultural operations to increase farmers' income. (6) revitalizing science and technology, cultivating human resources, and improving technical level and productivity.

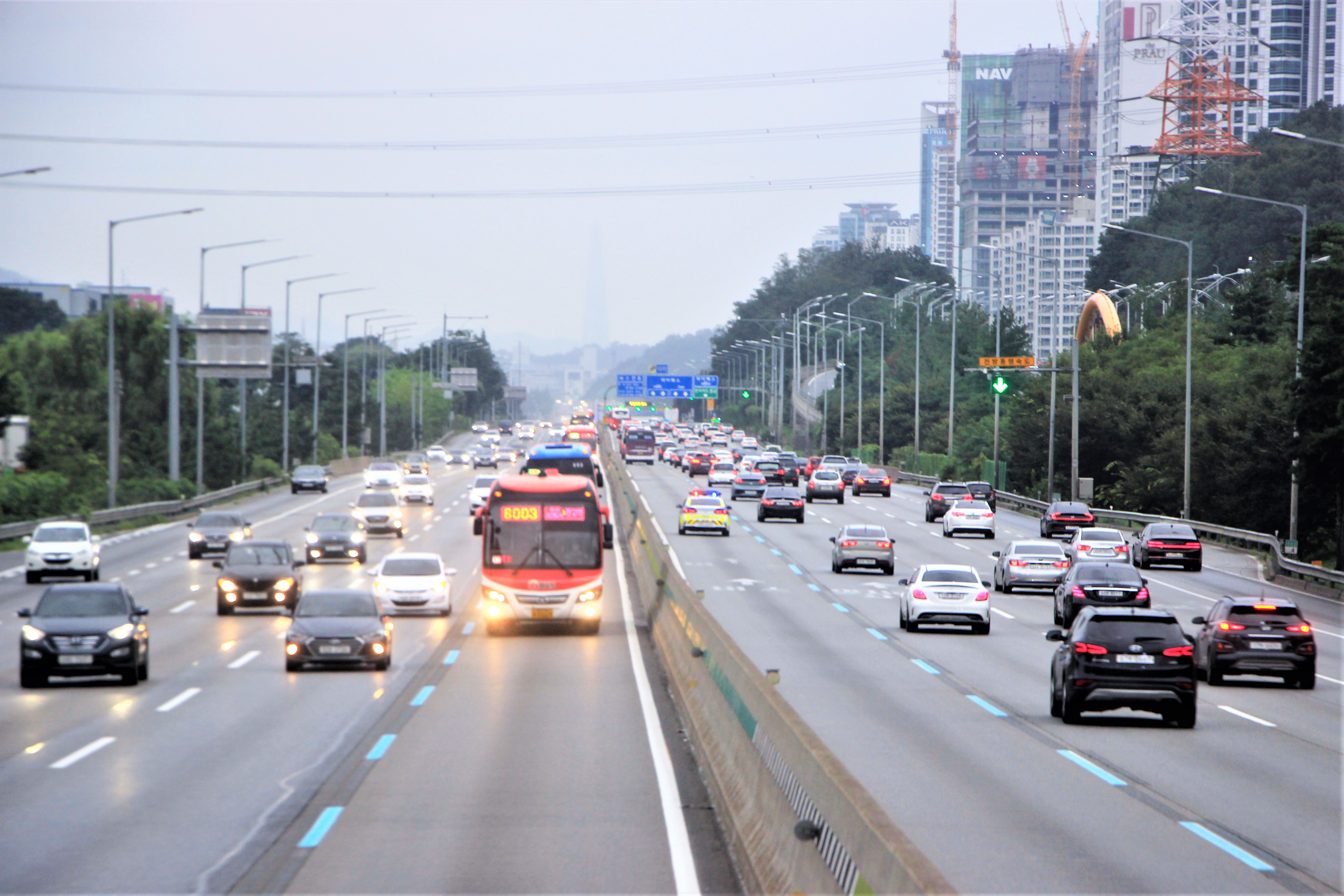
Gyeongbu Expressway is the first expressway in South Korea was built during the second five-year plan

The main economic targets set forth in the Second Five-Year Plan included: expanding the economic scale by 1971 to 1.5 times that of 1965; increasing per capita national income by 31%; achieving an average annual growth rate of 5% for the primary industry and 8% for other industries; increasing the share of industry and mining in the national economy from 22% to 27%; reducing the ratio of light industry to heavy industry from 72:28 to 66:34; increasing the employed population by 22% and reducing the total unemployment rate from 7.4% in 1965 to 5%; achieving self-sufficiency in grain, with per capita daily consumption increasing from 3.6 liters to 3.8 liters; maintaining per capita annual consumption of cotton textiles at approximately 3 meters, and increasing consumption of chemical fiber products from 0.7 kg to 1.3 kg; and constructing 833,000 new houses. ; Power generation increased from 3,250 million kilowatt-hours to 7,797 million kilowatt-hours, and per capita electricity consumption increased from 87 kilowatts to 192 kilowatts; the number of urban and rural telephone lines increased from 247,000 to 884,000; the greening of mountainous areas was promoted, the national road network and bridges were built, the unfortified land decreased from 26% to less than 5%, and the forest area expanded to more than 95%; the total freight volume increased from 5,365 million tons per kilometer to 9.5 billion tons per kilometer, and the total passenger volume increased from 11.9 billion people per kilometer to 23.4 billion people per kilometer; the export value of foreign trade reached US$550 million; the degree of fiscal self-reliance was further improved, and the proportion of domestic income in total fiscal revenue increased from 73% to 92%.

In 1968, the second year of the implementation of the Second Five-Year Plan, the Park Chung Hee government made significant adjustments to the plan, including: raising the average annual economic growth rate from 7% to 10%, and the gross national product in 1971 to reach 1,580.4 billion won at constant 1965 prices; controlling the population growth rate at 2% in 1971, and the per capita gross national product to reach 4,650 billion won; increasing the average annual growth rate of industry and mining from 10.7% to 20.2%, and increasing the average annual growth rate of social indirect capital and other service industries from 6.6% to 10.2%; and adjusting the total export value in 1971 to US$1.5 billion, of which US$1 billion was for merchandise exports, an increase of 83% over the original target.

Compared with the First Five-Year Plan, the Second Five-Year Plan has made great improvements in both its formulation and implementation, and has also achieved considerable results. During the Second Five-Year Plan, the average annual growth rate of the South Korean economy reached 9.7%, far exceeding the original plan of 7.0%, with the growth rate in 1969 reaching as high as 13.8%. Calculated at constant prices in 1965, the gross national product in 1971 reached 1,561.9 billion won, an increase of 93.8% over 1965, and the average annual growth rate of per capita gross national product was 9.4%, an increase of 72.5% over 1965. The annual growth rate of commodity exports exceeded 35%, and in 1971, commodity exports reached US$1,132 million, which was 6.4 times that of 1965. During the Second Five-Year Plan, the diplomatic relations between South Korea and Japan were normalized, and the outbreak of the Vietnam War led to a continuous increase in demand for military industry. In 1968, the Gyeongin Expressway, the first modern expressway in South Korea connecting Seoul and Incheon, was officially opened to traffic. Two years later, the Gyeongbu Expressway opened to traffic. During the Second Five-Year Plan period, South Korea also joined the General Agreement on Tariffs and Trade (GATT), participated in the Kennedy Round, and actively shifted towards an open system. However, due to the significant increase in the import of raw materials and means of production, the trade deficit gradually increased, the balance of payments deteriorated, the overseas dependence on investment was serious, agricultural development was sluggish, and inflation was not resolved.

=== The Third Five-Year Plan (1972–1976) ===
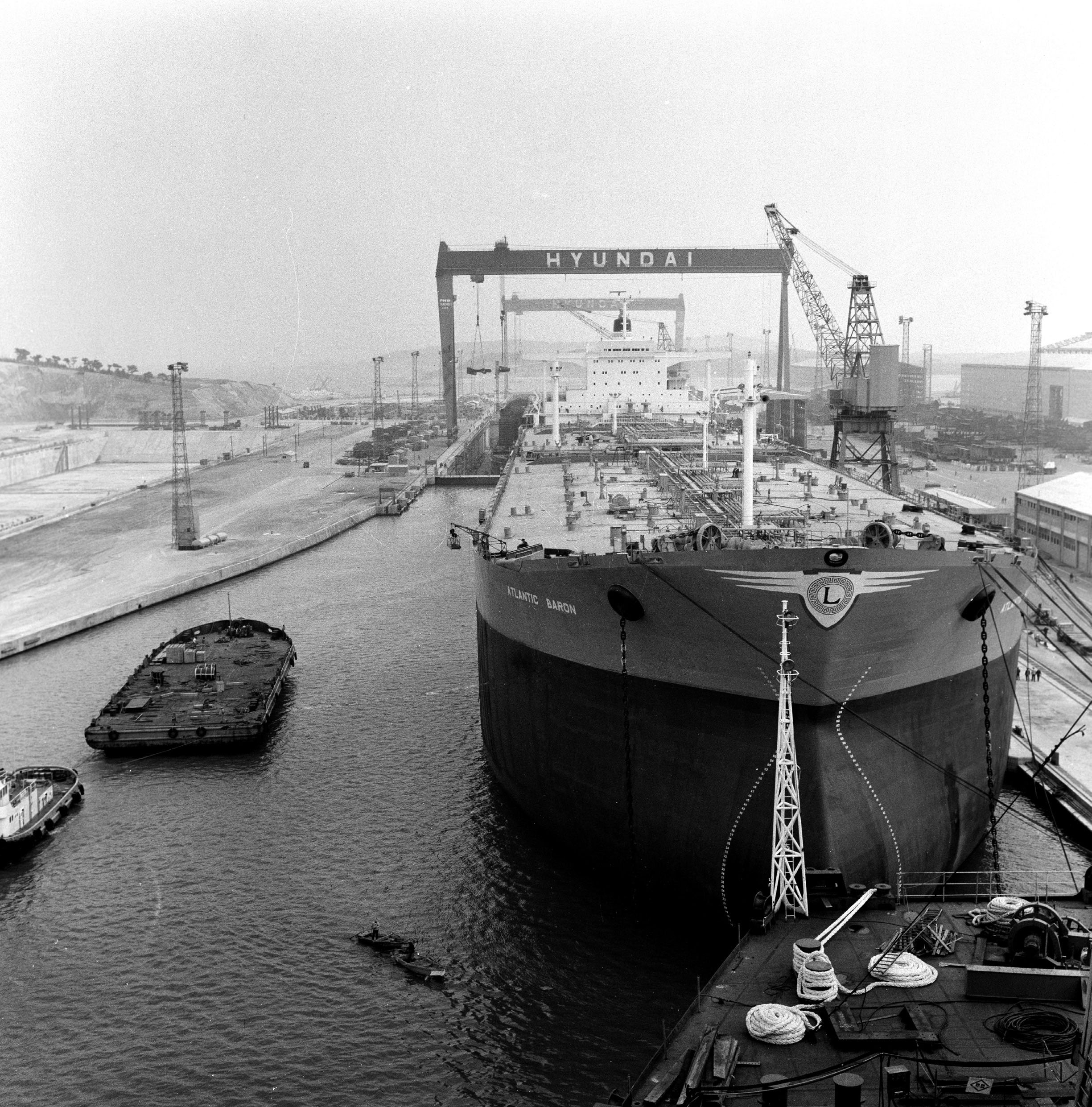
Hyundai Heavy Industries Ulsan Shipyard, 1976

During the first two five-year plans, the South Korean economy grew rapidly at an average annual rate of 9.1%, with an average annual export growth rate of nearly 40%, and the investment rate increased from 12.4% in 1962 to 28.1% in 1971. The domestic savings rate also increased significantly. Based on the achievements of the first and second five-year plans, the third five-year plan was formulated with the basic goal of building South Korea into a moderately developed country The third five-year plan sought to "coordinate growth, stability, and balance" and maintain balanced and stable development. By increasing the income of farmers and low-income earners, the gap between urban and rural areas was narrowed, and the welfare level of all citizens was improved. Through comprehensive land development such as the development of the four major river basins of Han River, Nakdong River, Yeongsan River, and Geum River, and the expansion of the road network, regional balanced development was promoted. By promoting industrial upgrading, improving the balance of payments, achieving food self-sufficiency, and establishing an "independent economic structure".

"Vigorously develop the economy of rural and fishing villages, significantly increase exports, and build heavy chemical industries" is the basic point of the Third Five-Year Plan. Its policy priorities include: (1) increasing grain production and farmers' and fishermen's income, achieving grain self-sufficiency, and promoting the improvement and mechanization of arable land. (2) improving the cultural and welfare facilities of rural and fishing villages, promoting the electrification of rural and fishing villages and the expansion of road networks. (3) vigorously developing exports and improving the balance of payments. (4) building heavy chemical industries and upgrading the industrial structure. (5) accelerating the development of science and technology and education, and promoting the development of human resources. (6) developing indirect social capital such as electricity, transportation, warehousing, and communications in a balanced manner. (7) effectively opening up the land resources of the four major rivers, establishing export industrial parks, appropriately dispersing industrial and population distribution, and promoting balanced regional development. (8) expanding housing, social security and other undertakings, improving the working environment, and raising national welfare and living standards.

To promote the development of low-productivity sectors such as agriculture, fishing, small and medium-sized enterprises, and distribution, and to achieve balanced development, the Third Five-Year Plan set an average annual growth rate of 8.6%, lower than the actual growth rate of the Second Five-Year Plan. The average annual growth rate for the agriculture, forestry, and fisheries sector was set at 4.5%, higher than the 2.5% average annual growth rate of the previous two Five-Year Plans. The average annual growth rate for the industry and mining sector was set at 13%, continuing to dominate economic growth. The proportion of heavy industries such as steel, machinery, and petrochemicals in the industrial structure also increased from 35.9% in 1970 to 40.5% in 1976. The average annual growth rate for social indirect capital and other service industries was set at 8.5%, with the average annual growth rate for sectors that could more effectively support the development of other industries, such as electricity, transportation, communications, and construction, set at 12.3%. The average annual growth rate for exports was set at 24.3%, and for imports at 12.9%, to improve the balance of payments. In 1970, South Korea's population growth rate was 2.21%, and the plan was to maintain the population growth rate at 1.5% after 1973. At constant 1970 prices, per capita national income would need to increase from $223 in 1970 to $389 in 1976. The unemployment rate would need to decrease from 4.6% in 1970 to 4.0%.

In October 1973, the Middle East war triggered a global oil crisis, which caused the global economy to stagnate. The world economic growth rate dropped from 6.2% in 1973 to 1% in 1975, and countries such as the United States, Japan, and Germany experienced negative economic growth. The severe international economic situation caused South Korea to suffer from slowing growth, soaring international prices, and deteriorating international balance of payments between 1974 and 1975. However, because South Korea focused its economic development on heavy chemical industries and supporting export industrialization, and actively entered the Middle East market shortly after the oil crisis, a large amount of foreign exchange flowed back to South Korea. Compared with the United States, Japan, and Germany, the South Korean economy withstood the test of the oil crisis. During the Third Five-Year Plan period, the average annual growth rate of South Korea's economy reached 10.1%, which not only exceeded the original growth target of 8.6%, but also exceeded the economic growth rate of the previous two five-year plans. However, the annual economic growth rate fluctuated greatly. It was 5.8% in 1972, 14.9% in 1973, dropped to 8.0% and 7.1% in 1974 and 1975 respectively, and then rose sharply to 15.1% in 1976.

South Korea's rapid economic growth under the adverse effects of the global oil crisis is attributed to its export-driven industrial and mining sector, which grew at an average annual rate of 20%, the increase in domestic investment, and the stable growth of the agricultural and forestry sector. The promotion of export-oriented heavy chemical industry not only boosted the rapid growth of South Korea's economy, but also completely changed the industrial structure of South Korea's economy and contributed to the upgrading of the industrial structure. In 1973, the first phase of the modernization of Pohang Steel was completed, which brought South Korea's steel industry into a new historical development period. In the same year, Ulsan Shipyard was built and put into operation, becoming the starting point for the take-off of South Korea's shipbuilding industry. In 1975, Pony, the first brand car designed by Hyundai in South Korea, was put into production, with a localization rate of 90%. During the Third Five-Year Plan period, South Korea's average annual investment rate was 27.8%, which not only exceeded the original plan of 24.9%, but also exceeded the investment rate of 26.4% during the Second Five-Year Plan period, effectively boosting economic growth. The high investment rate during the Third Five-Year Plan period mainly relied on the increase in the domestic savings rate. South Korea's average annual domestic savings rate increased from 6.1% during the First Five-Year Plan period and 13.1% during the Second Five-Year Plan period to 18.2%, while the foreign savings rate detoured from 8.8% and 12.9% to 9.8%. The "New Village Movement" that started in 1970 brought about revolutionary changes in South Korea's rural areas during the Third Five-Year Plan period, and farmers' income and lives were greatly improved. After 1975, South Korea achieved self-sufficiency in rice and barley.

During the Third Five-Year Plan period, due to the rise in international crude oil and import prices, South Korea's international balance of payments deteriorated. In 1972 and 1973, South Korea's current account deficit was only US$300 million, but it increased to US$2 billion in 1974. Due to the high dependence of the South Korean economy on foreign trade, South Korea could only cope with the rise in international oil prices by raising domestic prices. During the Third Five-Year Plan period, South Korea's wholesale prices rose by an average of 20.1% per year, of which 40.1% rose in 1974. The government-led heavy industry policy further deepened the imbalance between various industries in the South Korean economy, hindered the development of other sectors, led to the misallocation of resources, and reduced the efficiency of the entire national economy. The problems that arose during the first two Five-Year Plan periods were not only not resolved during the Third Five-Year Plan period, but were further aggravated, especially the problem of uneven distribution of national income and social development became more serious.

=== The Fourth Five-Year Plan (1977–1981) ===
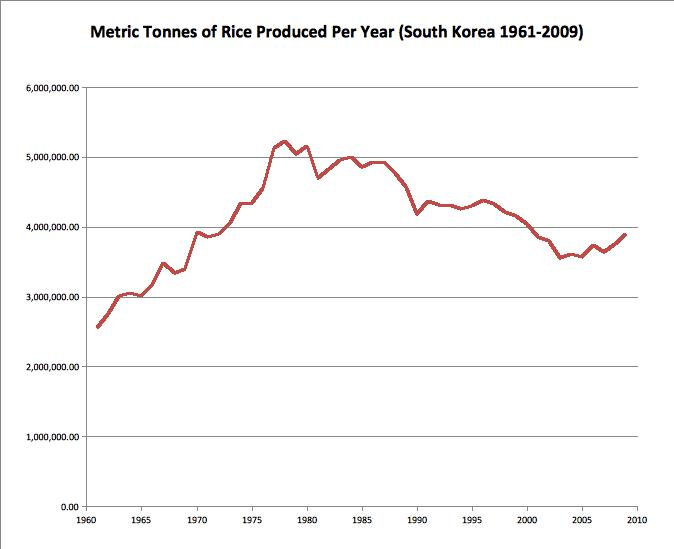
Historical rice production chart of South Korea

The Fourth Five-Year Plan continued to focus on high-speed economic growth. However, considering the unfavorable international economic situation during the Third Five-Year Plan period and the actual state of the Korean economy, the Korean government adjusted the tone of the development plan. The Fourth Five-Year Plan was based on the concept of "growth, equity, and efficiency," with the goal of establishing a self-reliant growth structure and improving social equity and efficiency through social development and technological innovation.

The policy priorities of the Fourth Five-Year Plan include: (1) Establishing a self-reliant growth structure, increasing the domestic savings rate, enhancing the ability to raise investment independently, eliminating the international balance of payments deficit, achieving international balance of payments balance, optimizing the industrial structure, and enhancing the international competitiveness of industries. (2) Promoting social development and improving national welfare. Promote comprehensive and systematic social development, improve the first income distribution in the process of economic activities by strengthening employment, education, health care, and vocational training, and improve the second income distribution through taxation and government transfer expenditures, so as to achieve a welfare society. Complete the electrification of rural and fishing villages, water supply facilities and roof renovation, etc. to further improve the living environment of farmers and fishermen, expand housing supply, prevent public pollution, and meet the basic needs of social life. (3) Promoting technological innovation, improving the management mechanism, improving efficiency, and enhancing the international competitiveness of industries.

The main economic targets set in the Fourth Five-Year Plan included: an average annual economic growth rate of 9.2%, with per capita GDP reaching US$1,512 by 1981. The domestic savings rate was to rise to 26.1% by 1981, with all investment to be funded domestically. The inflation rate was to be controlled at 8-9%, and the average annual GDP growth rate was to remain around 20%. In terms of industrial structure, the proportion of industry and mining was to rise from 29.7% in 1975 to 40.9% by 1981. Heavy industry was to grow at an average annual rate of 17.3%, and light industry at 11.8%. The proportion of heavy industry in the industrial structure was to increase from 42.4% in 1975 to 49.5% by 1981. Regarding the balance of payments, a current account balance was to be achieved by 1979, and a trade balance by 1980. The ratio of foreign debt to GDP decreased from 25% in 1975 to 23%, and the ratio of principal and interest on medium- and long-term loans to current income decreased from 12.7% to 10.5%.

During the Fourth Five-Year Plan period, due to various domestic and international reasons, many planned indicators, including the economic growth rate, failed to meet the targets. At the same time, the inherent structural problems of the South Korean economy were also fully exposed. During the implementation of the Fourth Five-Year Plan, the South Korean economy encountered many unexpected problems. The second oil crisis at the end of the 1970s caused the global economy to fall into recession again, resulting in South Korea's foreign debt burden becoming increasingly heavy. After President Park Chung Hee was assassinated in 1979, South Korean politics and society fell into chaos, and the economy lost stability. In addition, the rise of trade protectionism in developed countries reduced the scale of international trade. After South Korea achieved exports of US$10 billion in 1977, export growth began to slow down. During the Fourth Five-Year Plan period, South Korea's average annual economic growth rate was only 5.5%, far below the planned 9.2%, the lowest since 1962, and in 1980 it experienced a negative growth of -6.2% for the first time.

During the Fourth Five-Year Plan period, influenced by the second oil crisis and domestic circumstances, South Korea's wholesale prices rose by 19.7%, exceeding the planned target by more than 10%. The domestic savings rate fell to 22.8% in 1981, lower than the 1976 level (23.1%). However, the total investment rate significantly exceeded the planned target, reaching 35.5%. In 1981, South Korea's foreign debt reached US$32.5 billion, far exceeding the projected US$13.6 billion, making it the world's fourth-largest debtor nation at the time. The Fourth Five-Year Plan period was a time of vigorous promotion of heavy and chemical industries in South Korea. In 1981, heavy and chemical industries accounted for 53% of the manufacturing sector, exceeding the planned target. However, the mining and industrial sectors accounted for only 30% of the overall national economy, far below the planned 40.9%, while the tertiary sector's share increased. The ratio of domestic investment to domestic savings fell from 90-92% between 1976 and 1977 to 63-70% between 1980 and 1981.

=== The Fifth Five-Year Plan (1982–1986) ===
After the first four five-year plans, the South Korean economy achieved great results in both quantity and quality. However, due to the second oil crisis and the instability of South Korean society, especially the unprecedented natural disaster in 1980 that led to a large crop failure, the South Korean economy experienced a negative growth in 1980, and the economic situation was not optimistic. The problems of Tonghua expansion caused by previous economic development, inefficiency factors in the economy and society, income gap and regional development imbalance have further expanded. Based on these circumstances, the South Korean Fifth Five-Year Plan was based on the basic concept of "stability, efficiency and balance", and determined new development goals and strategies, and redefined the nature and role of government plans. Starting from the Fifth Five-Year Plan, the South Korean government changed the name of the "Five-Year Plan for Economic Development" to the "Five-Year Plan for Economic and Social Development" to show that it not only attaches importance to economic growth but also to social development.

The South Korean government began formulating the Fifth Five-Year Plan in 1980 and completed it in 1981 The basic objectives of the Fifth Five-Year Plan were: (1) to consolidate the foundation of economic stability, stabilize the national life, strengthen competitiveness, and improve the balance of payments. (2) to consolidate the foundation of sustained growth, expand employment opportunities, and increase income. (3) to improve national welfare through balanced development among different income groups and different regions Its policy priorities included: (1) to stabilize prices and control the annual price increase within 10%. In the first half of the Fifth Five-Year Plan, it vigorously rectified structural inflation. (2) to maximize investment efficiency and increase savings to ensure an average annual economic growth rate of 7-8%. (3) to give full play to the market function and promote competition. (4) to more actively promote the policy of opening up to the outside world with export strategy as the main focus. (5) to support industries with comparative advantages that are competitive in the international market. (6) to develop the land in a balanced manner and protect the environment. (7) Actively promote social development to meet the basic needs of the people.

The economic targets set for the Fifth Five-Year Plan mainly included: an average annual economic growth rate of 7.0%, with agriculture, forestry, and fisheries growing at 2.6%, industry and mining at 10.8%, and social indirect capital and other services at 7.3%. Calculated at constant 1980 prices, total investment during the Fifth Five-Year Plan period was 75.8 trillion won, with an average annual investment rate of 31.6%. The domestic savings rate was to reach 29.6% by 1986, while the foreign savings rate was to decrease to 2.9%. The proportion of social indirect capital in total fixed capital investment in the national economy was to increase from 33.9% in 1979 to 34.1%. Investment in social indirect capital mainly included nuclear power plants, telecommunications projects, subway projects in Seoul and Busan, and local road projects. Furthermore, the proportion of investment in housing construction was to increase from 15.8% to 20%, with 1.46 million new housing units planned for construction during the plan period. By 1986, the housing penetration rate was to increase from 74.5% in 1980 to 78.4%. The proportion of investment in education should be increased from 3.0% to 5.0%. The proportion of investment in manufacturing and agriculture should be reduced accordingly. The average annual growth rate of exports, calculated at current prices, is 20.3%, and the total export value should reach US$53 billion in 1985. The average annual growth rate of imports, calculated at FOB prices, is 17.1%. In 1986, the current account deficit should be reduced from US$4.9 billion in 1982 to US$3.6 billion in 1986.

In December 1983, the South Korean government proposed the "Fifth Five-Year Revision Plan" (1984-1986) in response to many problems with heavy chemical industry investment in the late 1970s The revision plan expanded the basis for autonomous growth and lowered the average annual economic growth rate from the original 7.6% to 7.5%. The balance of payments was to achieve a surplus of US$400 million in 1986, and the foreign debt was to be reduced from the original US$64.5 billion to US$47.4 billion. In order to effectively control the scale of foreign debt and stabilize domestic prices, South Korea will strictly control the amount of currency issued. The revision plan also adjusted the development strategy centered on large enterprises and strived to achieve import liberalization at the level of developed countries by 1986. In addition, the revision plan also proposed a policy to control the expansion of the capital region in order to achieve balanced regional development.

During the Fifth Five-Year Plan period, South Korea's economy achieved an average annual real growth rate of 9.8%, with agriculture, forestry, and fisheries growing at 3.8%, industry and mining at 11.8%, and social indirect capital and other services at 11.4%, all exceeding planned targets. In 1986, South Korea's total investment rate reached 28.9%, the domestic savings rate reached 32.8%, and the foreign savings rate fell to -4.4%, marking the first time in South Korea's modern economic history that investment funds were entirely raised domestically. Benefiting from the favorable conditions of low exchange rates, low interest rates, and low oil prices in the international market, South Korea's current account balance showed a decreasing trend year by year during the Fifth Five-Year Plan period, resulting in a surplus of US$461.7 million in 1986, and a trade surplus of over US$4.2 billion. However, due to South Korea's large total foreign debt, the non-trade balance did not improve significantly. Although exports did not reach the planned US$35.1 billion, imports fell to US$29.7 billion, lower than the planned US$35.1 billion, indicating that import substitution and technological upgrading of South Korean domestic industries also played a role in improving the balance of payments. Due to the stability of international oil and raw material prices and the South Korean government's price stabilization policy, South Korea achieved significant success in stabilizing prices during the Fifth Five-Year Plan period, with the average annual increase in wholesale prices being only 1%. Inflation was brought under control, with the average annual growth rate of retail prices at 3.6% and the unemployment rate remaining at 4.0%.

The Fifth Five-Year Plan period was a typical period in which the South Korean economy achieved rapid growth on the basis of stable prices. The South Korean economy became significantly more self-reliant, the balance of payments improved significantly, the competitiveness of enterprises improved, and the income inequality improved. From the perspective of South Korean economic history, the greatest achievement of the Fifth Five-Year Plan was the formulation of an economic development strategy of "private sector-led, stable development, and free competition" based on the new situation of the South Korean economy. The Fifth Five-Year Plan clearly distinguished the status of economic planning in private economic activities and the role of government activities. In the private economic field, the economic plan emphasized the guiding function and reduced government intervention. However, in areas related to the basic needs of the people, such as education, housing, and health care, the plan emphasized the active intervention of the government to make up for the deficiencies of market functions.

=== The Sixth Five-Year Plan (1987–1991) ===
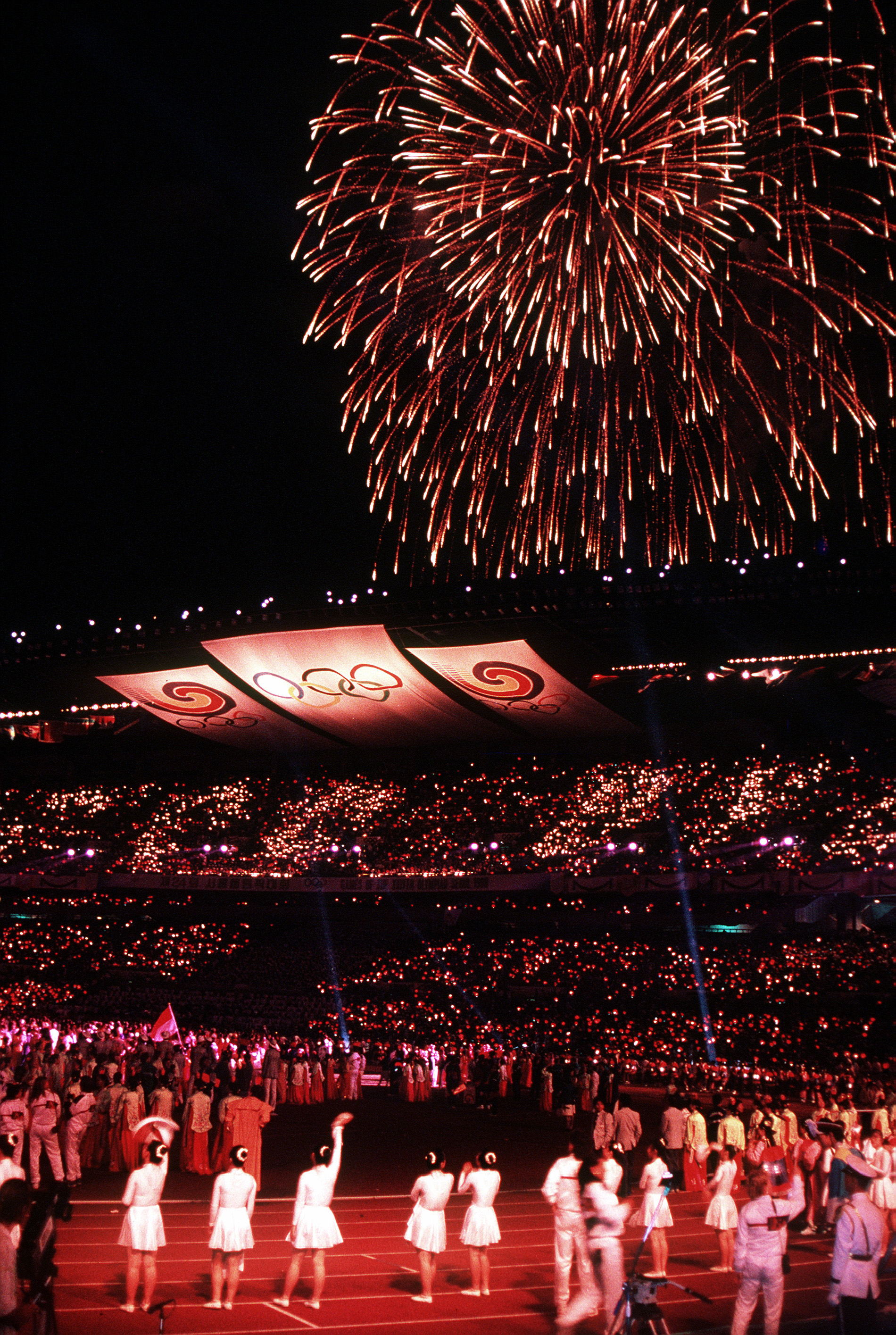
South Korea successfully hosted the 24th Summer Olympic Games in 1988.

In the 1980s, the South Korean government began to actively promote the principle of free market competition and promoted import liberalization. During the Sixth Five-Year Plan period, South Korea faced increasing trade protectionism and pressure from developed countries such as the United States to open its market. On the other hand, the demand for balanced development from different sectors, regions and classes in the country also became stronger. The Sixth Five-Year Plan was formulated in 1985 and completed in 1986. However, due to the influence of the "three lows" in the international market at the beginning of the Sixth Five-Year Plan, South Korea's international balance of payments surplus increased significantly, which also led to a general rise in domestic prices, stock market and real estate prices. The victory of the democratic movement in June 1987 and the conflict of economic interests between different classes also led to social instability. In order to solve these problems, the South Korean government made significant revisions to the original plan and proposed the "Revised Plan" (1988–1991) in 1988.

The basic goal of the Sixth Five-Year Plan is to "achieve an advanced economy based on efficiency and fairness and improve national welfare." To this end, (1) the government and social leaders should cooperate to establish an economic and social system and order that can maximize the creativity of all levels of the people. (2) In order to accelerate the growth and development of the Korean economy in competition with developed countries, entrepreneurs and workers should work together to restructure the industrial structure and improve the level of technology. (3) Through the balanced development of regional societies, promote the development of the entire national economy and enable the low-income class to share more of the fruits of economic growth, so as to improve the welfare of all the people.

To achieve its basic objectives, the basic strategy of the Sixth Five-Year Plan was: (1) to establish an advanced economic and social system and order, including simplifying various approval systems for private enterprises, vigorously promoting financial autonomy, allocating resources according to the market, restricting the unlimited expansion of large enterprises, establishing a fair trading order, improving labor relations, strengthening tax administration and consumer rights protection, and redefining government functions to suit the market economy order. (2) to reorganize the industrial structure and realize the goal of building a nation based on science and technology, including expanding investment in industries such as machinery, electronics, transportation equipment, and fine chemicals, increasing the added value of traditional export industries such as textiles and footwear, vigorously supporting the development of small and medium-sized enterprises, especially those in the fields of machinery, parts and materials, to promote import substitution and export development, increase the proportion of science and technology investment in GDP, strengthen the training of scientific and technological personnel and the investment in scientific research funds, promote the rationalization of enterprise management, and enhance the international competitiveness of enterprises. (3) Promote balanced regional and social development and enhance national welfare, including continuing to reorganize the capital region, promoting the formation of economic zones centered on major local cities, building local industrial zones centered on agricultural and industrial areas, continuing to promote appropriate economic growth, expanding the middle class, strengthening vocational training and lifelong education system, fully implementing medical insurance in rural and fishing villages (1988) and cities (1989), and implementing the national pension system starting in 1988.

The main economic targets set in the Sixth Five-Year Plan included: an average annual economic growth rate of 7.3%, with agriculture, forestry, and fisheries growing at 6.6%, industry and mining at 12.5% (of which manufacturing accounted for 12.8%), social indirect capital at 10.2%, and other service industries at 10.8%. The total investment target for the Sixth Five-Year Plan period was US$177,027 billion, with an average annual investment rate of 30.7%. The domestic savings rate was to reach 33.5% by 1991, while the foreign savings rate was to decrease to -2.2%. The proportion of each industry in total investment was: agriculture, forestry, and fisheries 5.5%, industry and mining 29.7%, social indirect capital 23.8%, and other service industries 41.0%. The average annual wholesale price increase was 2.0%, and the retail price increase was 3.0%. The international current account surplus was to be maintained at US$5 billion annually, with the trade surplus increasing from US$5 billion in 1987 to US$5.5 billion in 1991. By 1991, the total foreign debt was to be reduced from US$41.8 billion in 1987 to US$32.9 billion.

Influenced by the favorable factors of the international community's "three lows", the main indicators of South Korea's macroeconomy in the first year of the Sixth Five-Year Plan far exceeded the original targets. Therefore, the South Korean government made a major revision to the plan in 1988. The basic goal of the revised plan was to enhance economic vitality based on "autonomy, stability and welfare coordination", emphasizing the fairness and justice of economic operation, balanced economic development, openness and internationalization, and focusing on improving the living standards of the people. The revised average annual economic growth rate was raised from 7.9% to 7.5%, and the per capita national income in 1991 was raised from US$4,000 to US$5,500. Retail prices were stabilized at 5%. The ratio of the current account surplus to GDP was lowered from 8% in 1987 to 2-3%, and it was decided to appropriately increase imports, expand international cooperation, and promote foreign investment.

During the Sixth Five-Year Plan period, South Korea's economy achieved an average annual real growth rate of 10.0%, exceeding the original target, with the growth rate reaching as high as 12-13% in 1987-1988. In 1991, South Korea's per capita GDP reached US$6,518, and the unemployment rate fell to 2.3%, achieving full employment. Due to a sharp increase in domestic demand and rising agricultural product prices, South Korea's retail prices rose by 8.6% and 9.7% in 1990 and 1991 respectively, failing to reach the revised plan's target of 5%. However, wholesale prices remained stable, with an average annual increase of only 3.3%. The tertiary sector, influenced by the expansion of the service industry, accounted for over 60% of the national economy. The manufacturing sector's share, after reaching 32.5% in 1988, began to gradually decline, but significant growth was seen in the fields of fine machinery, semiconductors, electronics, and communications. The share of agriculture, forestry, and fisheries continued to decline. In terms of international payments, South Korea consistently achieved a balance of payments surplus from 1987 to 1989, with a current account surplus of US$14.16 billion in 1988. However, with the opening of the South Korean domestic market, the appreciation of the Korean won, and the rise in labor costs, South Korea's international payments deficit turned again in 1990 and 1991, and foreign debt also rebounded.

During the Sixth Five-Year Plan period, South Korea transitioned from authoritarian politics to democratic politics, and the living standards and welfare of its citizens were greatly improved. The establishment of welfare systems such as the minimum wage system (1988), the national pension system (1988), and the national medical insurance system (1989) formed the basic framework of South Korea's social security system. The new urban construction and 2 million housing construction plan launched in 1988 increased the housing penetration rate in South Korea from 69.1% in 1982-1986 to 74.2% in 1987-1991. Through hosting the 1988 Summer Olympics and implementing the Northern Policy, South Korea's internationalization and openness were significantly improved. In 1991, the liberalization rate of South Korea's industrial imports reached 99.9%.

=== The Seventh Five-Year Plan (1992–1996) ===
The basic goal of the Seventh Five-Year Plan is to "face the 21st century, strive to achieve an advanced economic society, and promote national reunification." To achieve this basic goal, the South Korean government has formulated three basic strategies: (1) strengthening enterprise competitiveness, (2) improving social equity and promoting balanced development, and (3) promoting internationalization and autonomy to lay the foundation for North-South reunification. The 10 major policy issues of the Seventh Five-Year Plan are: (1) reforming the education and human resource training system to adapt to the needs of industrial society; (2) promoting technological innovation and informatization; (3) expanding social indirect facilities and improving the efficiency of the transportation system; (4) improving the efficiency of enterprise management and industrial organization and strengthening the competitiveness of small and medium-sized enterprises; (5) improving the structure of rural and fishing villages and promoting balanced regional development; (6) actively solving housing and environmental protection problems; (7) expanding the social security system and developing spiritual culture; (8) actively promoting autonomy and re-establishing government functions; (9) expanding and developing opening up to the outside world; and (10) laying the foundation for North-South reunification through North-South exchanges and cooperation.

The main economic targets set in the Seventh Five-Year Plan included: an average annual economic growth rate of 7.5%. Specifically, the annual growth rate for agriculture, forestry, and fisheries was 1.5%, with its share of the overall economy decreasing from 8.9% in 1991 to 6.4% in 1996. The average annual growth rate for manufacturing was 9.8%, with its share of the national economy increasing from 28.7% in 1991 to 32%. Manufacturing growth would be led by the machinery and electronics industries, with continued growth in the automobile and shipbuilding industries. The share of indirect capital and other service industries would remain unchanged. During the planning period, retail prices were to be controlled at around 6% in the medium term and around 5% in the later period, while the annual increase in wholesale prices was to be controlled between 2-3% from the medium term onwards. Regarding the balance of payments, the plan aimed to achieve a current account balance, reaching a surplus of US$6.5 billion by 1996. The export product structure would shift towards heavy chemical products, accounting for over 60%, while the share of light industrial products such as textiles would gradually decrease. In terms of imports, the share of raw materials and capital goods would decrease, while the share of consumer goods would increase.

In 1993, more than a year after the implementation of the Seventh Five-Year Plan, Kim Young-sam became the 14th President of South Korea, ending 32 years of military rule in South Korea since 1961. After taking office, Kim Young-sam formulated the "New Five-Year Economic Plan" to replace the original Seventh Five-Year Plan. The goal of the New Five-Year Economic Plan was to bring South Korea's economy into the advanced economic zone during the planning period and lay a solid economic foundation for the unification of North and South Korea. Its basic strategy was to first lay the foundation for the implementation of the New Five-Year Economic Plan through the "100-Day Plan for the New Economy", and secondly to create new development momentum through reform. The seven major tasks of the New 100-Day Plan for the New Economy included: (1) encouraging investment and stimulating economic recovery; (2) supporting small and medium-sized enterprises; (3) improving the efficiency of technology development investment; (4) eliminating various administrative controls that hinder enterprise development and improving the autonomy of enterprises; (5) preparing a plan to significantly improve the structure of rural and fishing villages; (6) strictly managing the prices of daily necessities; and (7) promoting a national consciousness reform movement centered on public officials to improve the effectiveness of institutional reform.

The New Economic Five-Year Plan clarified the key points of each year's plan. In 1993, a 100-day plan was implemented to restore economic prosperity, and in the second half of the year, formal reforms of the domestic economic sector, such as finance and fiscal policy, were initiated. In 1994, the reform of the domestic economic sector was completed, and reforms of the foreign economic sector were initiated. In 1995, the reform of the foreign economic sector was vigorously promoted. In 1996, the reform of the foreign economic sector was completed, and the quality of national identity was improved in terms of housing, environment, transportation, elderly care, and welfare. In 1997, the Korean economy leaped to become the "new economy" of the entire nation.

The economic goals set forth in the New Five-Year Plan were not much different from those of the original Seventh Five-Year Plan, but were generally more conservative. The average annual economic growth rate was set at 6.9%, and the per capita GDP was to exceed US$14,000 in 1998. The average annual domestic savings rate was to reach 36%, reaching 37.5% in 1998, and the average annual domestic total investment rate was to reach 35.8%, reaching 37.5% in 1998. The average annual increase in retail prices was 3.7%, and the average annual increase in wholesale prices was 1.6%. The international current account balance was to reach a balance in 1994, and then turn into a surplus, with the surplus reaching US$5.3 billion by the end of 1998.

Due to some mistakes in the economic policies of the Roh Tae-woo government, South Korea's economic growth rate dropped to 5.1% in 1992, the lowest since 1962 except for 1980. After the implementation of the new five-year economic plan, South Korea's economic growth rate was 5.8% in 1993, rose to 8.4% in 1994, and reached 9.3% in 1995. In 1995, South Korea's GDP reached US$456 billion, ranking 11th in the world, and its per capita GDP reached US$10,163, ranking 32nd in the world. The average annual retail price increase rate from 1992 to 1995 was 5.4%.

The reform measures of the New Economic Five-Year Plan have achieved significant results in combating corruption, promoting social fairness and economic justice, easing government administrative control, revitalizing business operations, promoting economic growth, and promoting the liberalization of financial capital. In particular, the financial real-name system implemented on 12 August 1993, has had a good effect on the long-term development of the financial market and the economy. However, structural problems accumulated over decades of South Korea's economic development, such as large enterprises versus small and medium-sized enterprises, light industry versus heavy industry, and government control versus private sector dominance, have not been resolved. The fragility of the financial structure and the relative backwardness of industrial technology are also yet to be addressed. The Kim Young-sam government also failed to effectively prevent the 1997 Asian financial crisis. In 1998, South Korea's economic growth rate dropped to -6.9%, the lowest since South Korea implemented the Five-Year Economic Plan. The subsequent President Kim Dae-jung's government stopped formulating a Five-Year Economic Plan.

== Summaries of the five-year plans ==
A summary list of South Korea's five-year economic plans
Plan	Average annual economic growth rate (real growth rate)	Objectives	Key policies
First Five-Year Plan (1962–1966)	7.1% (8.5%)	1. Correct all vicious cycles in the socio-economic system; 2. Lay the foundation for achieving a self-reliant economy.	1. Develop energy industries such as electricity and coal; 2. Enhance agricultural productivity, increase farmers' income, and correct imbalances in the national economic structure; 3. Expand core industries and enrich social indirect capital; 4. Make full use of idle resources, especially to increase employment and protect and develop the national territory; 5. Improve the balance of payments by increasing exports; 6. Revitalize technology.
Second Five-Year Plan (1967–1971)	7.0% (9.7%)	1. To modernize the industrial structure; 2. To further promote the establishment of an independent economy.	1. Achieve food self-sufficiency and promote afforestation in mountainous areas and the development of aquatic industries; 2. Develop chemical, steel, and machinery industries, double industrial production, and lay the foundation for upgrading the industrial structure; 3. Achieve exports of US$700 million, promote import substitution, and further improve the balance of payments; 4. Expand employment and implement family planning to curb rapid population growth; 5. Significantly increase national income, especially emphasizing diversified agricultural operations to increase farmers' income; 6. Revitalize science and technology, cultivate human resources, and improve technological level and productivity.
Third Five-Year Plan (1972–1976)	8.6% (10.1%)	1. Seek coordination among "growth, stability, and balance"; 2. Establish an independent economic structure; 3. Promote comprehensive national development and balanced regional opening-up.	1. Increase grain production and farmers' and fishermen's income, achieve grain self-sufficiency, and promote the improvement and mechanization of arable land; 2. Improve the cultural and welfare facilities of rural and fishing villages, and promote the electrification of rural and fishing villages and the expansion of road networks; 3. Vigorously develop exports and improve the balance of payments; 4. Build heavy chemical industries and upgrade the industrial structure; 5. Accelerate the development of science and technology and education, and promote the development of human resources; 6. Develop social indirect capital such as electricity, transportation, warehousing, and communications in a balanced manner; 7. Effectively carry out the opening up of land and resources in the four major rivers, establish export industrial parks, appropriately disperse industrial and population distribution, and promote balanced regional development; 8. Expand housing, social security and other undertakings, improve the working environment, and improve national welfare and living standards.
Fourth Five-Year Plan (1977–1981)	9.2% (5.5%)	Based on the principles of "growth, equity, and efficiency,": 1. a self-reliant growth structure is established; 2. social development is promoted; and 3. technological innovation is advanced to improve efficiency.	1. Raise investment resources independently; 2. Achieve balance of payments; 3. Optimize industrial structure and enhance international competitiveness; 4. Expand employment opportunities and promote human resource development; 5. Expand new village projects; 6. Improve living environment; 7. Expand investment in science and technology; 8. Improve management mechanisms and increase efficiency.
Fifth Five-Year Plan (1982–1986)	7.6% (9.8%)	Based on the principles of "stability, efficiency, and balance,": 1. consolidate the foundation of economic stability, stabilize people's lives, enhance competitiveness, and improve the balance of payments; 2. consolidate the foundation for sustained growth, expand employment opportunities, and increase income; 3. improve national welfare through balanced development among different income groups and different regions.	1. Curb inflation and stabilize prices; 2. Improve investment efficiency and increase savings; 3. Promote competition and restore market function; 4. Continue to promote the export-oriented opening-up policy; 5. Develop the land in a balanced manner and protect the environment; 6. Adjust government functions and improve administrative efficiency; 7. Promote technological innovation and improve industrial efficiency; 8. Improve the financial system; 9. Meet the basic needs of the people and actively promote social development; (10) Actively prepare for the 1988 Olympic Games.
Sixth Five-Year Plan (1987–1991)	7.3% (10.0%)	"To achieve an advanced economy based on efficiency and equity and to improve national welfare": 1. To establish a new economic and social system and order; 2. To restructure the industrial structure and improve the level of technology; 3. To improve the welfare of all citizens.	1. Maintain a moderate growth rate to expand employment opportunities; 2. Continue to maintain price stability; 3. Continue to maintain a balance of payments surplus and alleviate the burden of foreign debt; 4. Promote industrial restructuring and achieve a technology-based nation; 5. Promote balanced development among regions and integrated development of agriculture, fishing villages, and rural areas; 6. Improve national welfare and enhance the fairness of distribution; 7. Improve the market economic order and adjust government functions.
Seventh Five-Year Plan (1992–1996)	7.5% (7.3%)	Facing the 21st century, we strive to achieve an advanced economic and social system and promote national reunification.: 1. Strengthen enterprise competitiveness; 2. Improve social equity and promote balanced development; 3. Promote internationalization and autonomy to lay the foundation for the reunification of North and South.	1. Reform the education and human resource training system to adapt to the needs of industrial society; 2. Promote technological innovation and informatization; 3. Expand social indirect infrastructure and improve the efficiency of the transportation system; 4. Improve the efficiency of enterprise operation and industrial organization, and strengthen the competitiveness of small and medium-sized enterprises; 5. Improve the structure of rural and fishing villages and promote balanced regional development; 6. Actively solve housing and environmental protection problems; 7. Expand the social security system and develop spiritual culture; 8. Actively promote autonomy and re-establish government functions; 9. Expand and develop opening up to the outside world; 10. Lay the foundation for North-South reunification through North-South exchanges and cooperation.

== See also ==
- Economy of South Korea
- New Community Movement
- Five-year plans of other countries
