= Technological and industrial history of China =

Industry and technology since PRC's founding

At the time of its founding in 1949, the People's Republic of China (PRC) was one of the poorest countries in the world. In the early 1950s, its industry developed rapidly through a state-led process heavily influenced by the Soviet experience. Aiming to close the gap between its political ambitions and its phase of development, China began the Great Leap Forward, which sought to even more rapidly industrialize the country. The effort largely failed, and its policies contributed to the Great Chinese Famine.

Until the middle of the 1960s, industry was largely concentrated in northeast China. Following the Sino-Soviet split, Chinese leadership increasingly feared invasion from the Soviet Union or the United States. During the Third Five-Year Plan period, China instituted the Third Front Campaign to enhance the country's strategic depth by developing national defense and industrial infrastructure in the country's interior. The campaign further developed China's poorer regions. In developing infrastructure and human talent in these areas, the campaign also provided the conditions favorable for the Reform era's market-oriented development.

In 2015, China announced its Made in China 2025 initiative to accelerate domestic innovation in areas deemed crucial for the future of the world economy. China also seeks to increase both domestic innovation and domestic consumption through its economic strategy of "dual circulation."

== Overview ==
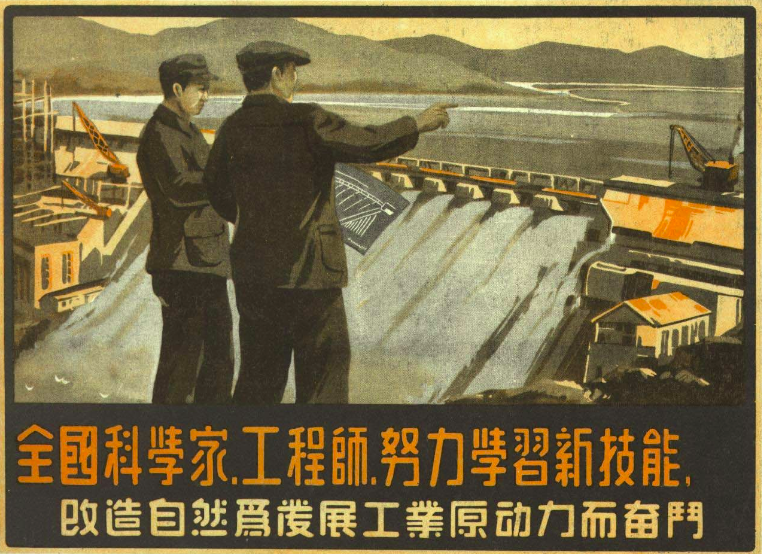
Promoted industrial construction when the government was established in 1950

In the first half of the 20th century, approaches to developing industry differed significantly by region. In coastal areas, most industry was privately owned and focused on consumer goods. Under both Chinese administration and Japanese colonization, Manchuria's industrial development was state-led. At a smaller scale than development in Manchuria, industrial development in China's northwest and southwest were also state-led.

During the Nanjing decade of 1927-1937, light industry was overwhelmingly privately owned.

The experience of the Second Sino-Japanese War convinced Chinese Communist Party (CCP) leadership that industrialization was the ultimate source of military strength. According to Mao Zedong, "Japanese imperialism bullies China in this way because of our backwardness. Therefore, it is the entire nation's mission to eradicate this backwardness."

In September 1947, the CCP issued its first economic plan for industry, the Northeast Administrative Commission's Outline of the Plan for Economic Construction of 1948.

=== Early PRC ===
When the PRC was founded in 1949, the country was one of the poorest in the world. Most of its industry was labor-intensive light industry like textiles and other consumer goods. The Chinese Civil War had devastated China's economy. The economy was further limited by the United States' embargo. The PRC therefore pursued a policy of rapid industrialization relying primarily on its domestic resources.

Article 35 of the 1949 Common Program adopted by the Chinese People's Political Consultative Conference emphasized the development of heavy industry, such as mining, iron and steel, power, machinery, electrical industry, and the chemical industry "in order to build a foundation for the industrialization of the nation."

To adapt to the limited resources of the early PRC, the government promoted the waste-recycling and production efficiency principle of "complete utilization". its underlying philosophy was expressed in the slogan "turning waste into treasure and harm into benefit."

Throughout the 1950s, China gradually restructured its industries under state ownership. China's state-led industrialization in the early 1950s was heavily influenced by the Soviet experience. During the 1950s, the Soviet Union was the largest supplier of machinery to Chinese industries. Publishing in 2017, academics Brandt, Ma, and Rawski contend that China's receipt of assistance from the Soviet Union and the Council for Mutual Economic Assistance (CMEA, or COMECON) was the largest technology transfer in history.

During China's First Five-Year Period (1953–1957), industrial development was the primary goal. The First Five-Year Plan's highest industrial sector priorities included: power plants, steel, mining, machinery, chemicals, and national defense, centered on steel and coal. To support these priorities, transportation, communication, and mining surveys also received significant state support. With Soviet assistance in the form of both funds and experts, China began to develop industries from scratch. Consistent with the focus on developing industry, northeast China was the region which received the greatest share of state funds during the Plan.

During that First Five-Year Period, agricultural and industrial production increased at double digit rates and the plan's production goals were fulfilled ahead of schedule. This contributed to the too-ambitious goals of the Great Leap Forward. Classical Marxist theory had hypothesized a relatively linear progression of development and a worldwide revolution beginning with the most developed countries, which did not occur. The Great Leap Forward attempted to defy the conventional understanding of the time required for economic development and, through rapid industrialization, it aimed to close the gap between China's developmental stage and its political aspirations. The Great Leap Forward failed to rapidly industrialize China. The allocation of agricultural workers to industrial work also had a negative impact on crop yields. Coupled with erroneous reports of surplus and weather conditions, famine resulted. Industrial successes included construction of the Daqing oil field, which was promoted as an example during subsequent industrialization campaigns.

Until the middle of the 1960s, China's industry was largely found in northeast China. Some resource extraction ministries were located elsewhere, for example oil and mining in Xinjiang and a large steel complex at Baotou.

From the 1960s through the conclusion of the Mao era, more than half of China's industrial output came from its heavy industry.

In the 1960s, Chen Boda advocated the strategy of "electrocentrism", through which the electronics industry should develop technological advancements and become embedded at all levels of China's economy. This included small-scale enterprises (not just large enterprises) producing electronics and that China could use the methods of a people's war to "smash electronic mysticism" and rapidly develop in the age of electronics.

During the Third Five-Year Plan period, the Chinese government instituted the Third Front campaign to enhance the country's strategic depth by developing industrial and military facilities in the country's interior in preparation for defending against the risk of invasion by the Soviet Union or the United States. Through its distribution of infrastructure, industry, and human capital around the country, the Third Front created favorable conditions for subsequent market development and private enterprise, and the development of Township and Village Enterprises.

Through the campaigns of the Great Leap Forward, the Third Front, and the Cultural Revolution, Mao advocated for a method of socialist industrialization which differed from the Soviet model. Although development in these eras continued to focus on heavy industry, unlike the First Five-Year Plan period, these later periods had a greater focus on decentralization of SOEs and regional projects.

=== Reform ===
Deng Xiaoping emphasized the Four Modernizations as part of China's Reform and Opening Up. Improved relationships with the capitalist countries, which began during the later Mao Zedong period and continued during Deng's leadership, along with the policymakers' perceptions of economic stagnation, prompted China to move further from the then-conventional approach to socialist industrialization.

During Reform and Opening Up, China's focus shifted from the development of heavy industry to a focus on light industry. In the 1980s, China developed into a major source of low-priced manufactured products.

After the 1993 resolution on the socialist market economy, private industry began to develop quickly in east China and south China.

=== Contemporary China ===
In 2006, China established the Medium to Long-Term Plan for the Development of Science and Technology. Prior national science and technology plans like the 863 Program and the Project 973 had promoted basic scientific research whereas the Medium to Long-Term Plan focused on promoting seven industries deemed strategically significant.

In 2010, the State Council issued the Decision on Accelerating the Development of Strategic Emerging Industries, which sought to support key breakthroughs in internationally competitive fields via a combination of market forces, state promotion, and state guidance. It identified key emerging industries of Energy Conservation and Environmental Protection, Next Generation Information Technology, Bioindustry, High-end Manufacturing, New Energy, New Materials, and New Energy Vehicles.

The Belt and Road Initiative, including its related Digital Silk Road, are significant parts of China's industrial development strategy.

In 2015, China launched its Made in China 2025 industrial policy. Its goal is to boost China's innovation in sectors deemed critical for the future of the world economy. Policy support for Made in China 2025 has also included government guidance funds, national laboratories, and state funded incentivization for research grants.

Beginning in 2017, the government has designated important historical industrial sites as "national industrial heritages", stating that their preservation would "strongly support the construction of a strong nation".

In 2017, the State Council released its artificial intelligence development blueprint, outlining the goal of making China a global leader in AI by 2030. China's government takes a market-oriented approach to AI, and has sought to encourage private tech companies in developing AI. In 2018, it designated Baidu, Alibaba, iFlytek, Tencent, and SenseTime as "AI champions".

During the general secretaryship of Xi Jinping, China has emphasized an economic strategy of dual circulation. First, it seeks to rely more on China's domestic consumers. Second, it seeks to innovate more domestically developed technology and thereby reduce China's reliance on western technology.

A 2023 Australian Strategic Policy Institute study of what it deemed as 44 critical technologies concluded that China leads the world in 37 of them, including 5G internet, electric batteries, and hypersonic missiles.

== Manufacturing industry ==
China's manufacturing sector developed according to the principle of "walking on two legs," a policy of self-reliance introduced in the 1950s. In the 1980s one leg consisted of the state-funded and state-controlled large and medium-sized plants with the most qualified personnel and the most advanced equipment. The other leg was small-scale plants using inferior equipment and large amounts of local labor. Together, the two sectors produced a wide range of industrial products. In most cases the larger plants accounted for the bulk of production, but the smaller enterprises were increasing their share and producing a significant percentage of cement, fertilizers, and farm machinery.

When the 2008 financial crisis resulted in decreased demand from Western markets, Chinese manufacturers re-oriented towards the domestic market. Many focused on domestic online marketing, either through creating their own brands or selling to other Chinese online sellers. In turn, this pivot by Chinese manufacturers increased the quantity and diversity of products available online, leading to a major increase in e-commerce in China.

Beginning in 2010 and continuing through at least 2023, China has produced more industrial goods per year than any other country. The proportion of Chinese manufactured goods at the higher end of the value chain grew after the early 2000s and accelerated further after 2020.

=== Steel ===
The steel industry of the People's Republic of China, initially small and hindered by war, expanded rapidly following market reforms in 1978, eventually becoming the world's largest producer. Despite this growth, the industry faced challenges with high debt, market volatility, and environmental pressures. Rising exports from 2023-2024 led to global oversupply, price drops, and tariffs, prompting China to halt new steel mill approvals and encourage overseas investments. China's central government has also worked to phase out unprofitable "zombie" companies while pushing for stricter environmental controls on steel production.

==== Electronics ====
The electronics industry in the People's Republic of China grew rapidly after the reform and opening up under the national strategic policy of accelerating the "informatization" of its industrial development. Subsequently, labour costs have risen and creating wealth for citizens. The industry has been a major contribution to the modernization of China and the development of new job opportunities. There are many instances of labour exploitation and subpar working conditions.

In the 2020s, China became the largest manufacturer of LCDs and Chinese firms had a 40% share of the global market. Chinese firms that developed into world industry leaders included BOE Technology, TCL-CSOT, TIANMA, and Visionox. Local governments had a significant role in this growth, including as a result of their investments in LCD manufacturers via state-owned investment companies. China had previously imported significant amounts of LCDs, and the growth of its LCD industry decreased prices for other consumer products that use LCDs and led to growth in other sectors like mobile phones. This was a factor in the growth of companies like Huawei and Xiaomi during the 2020s.

=== Chemicals ===
The chemical industry in the People's Republic of China valued at around $1.75 trillion in 2014. The country is currently the largest chemicals manufacturer in the world.

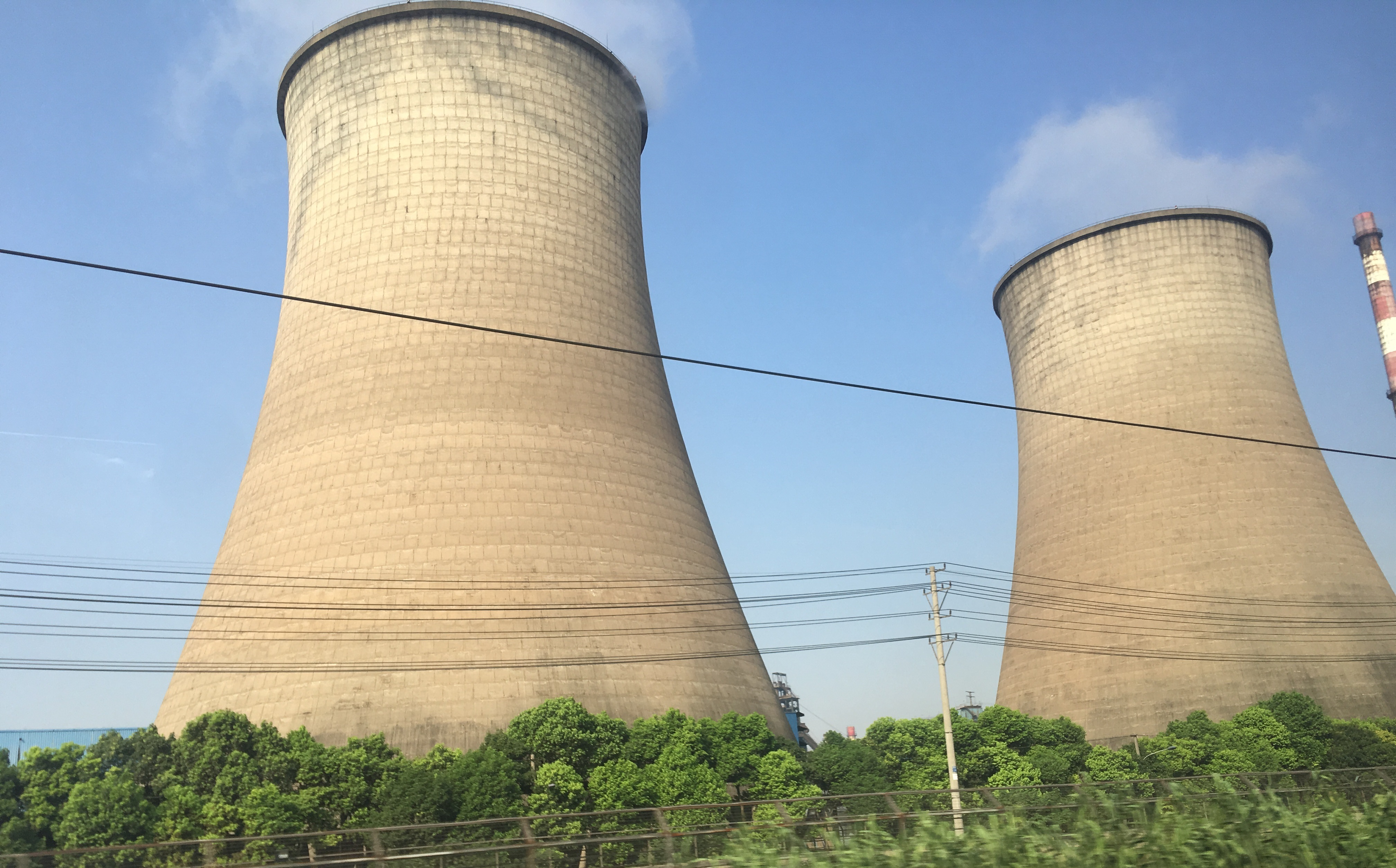

The chemical industry is central to modern China's economy. It uses special methods to alter the structure, composition or synthesis of substances to produce new products, such as steel, plastic, and ethyl. The chemical industry provides building materials for China's infrastructure, including subway, high-speed train, and highway.

=== Building materials ===
As an important part of the national sustainable development strategy, the development of advanced materials is advancing the competitive nature and state of the art for Chinese industry. The State has put advanced materials high on its development agenda for the next decade and listed it among the key high-tech industry sectors that would be given priority for development by the State Council. At present, the pace of building China's advanced materials industry is accelerating. Advanced materials have been key fields in China's national R&D system (National High Technology Research and Development Program (863 Program) and National Basic Research Program (973 Program)).

=== Optical fiber ===
In 1961, while China worked to develop its first nuclear weapon, its scientists proposed using optical fiber to measure blast signals during detonation experiments. China had no domestic production at the time, and optical fiber was too expensive to purchase abroad. As a result, China's central government decided to develop the country's own optical fiber industry. By the end of the 1970s, China had a sufficiently developed optical fiber industry to manufacture it for commercial use.

== Construction ==
Beginning in 2010 and continuing through at least 2024, China has the world's largest construction market.

=== Housing construction ===
Modern housing has been in chronic shortage in contemporary China. Housing conditions in 1949 were primitive and crowded, and massive population growth since then has placed great strains on the nation's building industry. According to 1985 estimates, 46 million additional units of housing, or about 2.4 billion square meters of floor space, would be needed by the year 2000 to house every urban family. Adequate housing was defined as an average of eight square meters of living space per capita. However, as of 1984, the average per capita living space was only 4.8 square meters. Housing specialists suggested that the housing construction and allocation system be reformed and that the eight-square-meter target be achieved in two stages: six square meters by 1990 and the additional two square meters between 1990 and 2000. To help relieve the situation, urban enterprises were increasing investment in housing for workers. In 1985 housing built by state and collective enterprises in cities and towns totaled 130 million square meters of floor space. In the countryside, housing built by farmers was 700 million square meters.

=== Capital construction ===
Since the 1950s, the capital construction industry has been plagued by excessive growth and compartmentalization. There were frequent cost overruns and construction delays, and resources were overtaxed. Project directors often failed to predict accurately the need for such elements as transportation, raw materials, and energy. A large number of small factories were built, providing surplus capacity at the national level but with deficient economies of scale at the plant level. Poor cooperation among ministries and provinces resulted in unnecessary duplication. Because each area strove for self-sufficiency in all phases of construction, specialization suffered. Since the early years of the People's Republic, overinvestment in construction has been a persistent problem. Fiscal reforms in 1979 and 1980 exacerbated overinvestment by allowing local governments to keep a much greater percentage of the revenue from enterprises in their respective areas. Local governments could then use the retained earnings to invest in factories in their areas. These investments, falling outside the national economic plan, interfered with the central government's control of capital investment.

In 1981 the economy underwent a period of "readjustment," during which the investment budget for capital construction was sharply reduced. This administrative solution to overinvestment proved ineffective, and later reforms concentrated on economic measures such as tax levies to discourage investment. The issuance of interest-bearing loans instead of grants was also intended to control construction growth. Despite reforms, capital construction continued at a heated pace in 1986. The majority of the new investment was unplanned, coming from loans or enterprises' internal capital.

During the Seventh Five-Year Plan, 925 medium-and large-scale projects were scheduled. The government planned to allocate ¥1.3 trillion for fixed assets, an increase of 70 percent over the Sixth Five-Year Plan. Forty percent of the funds were allocated for new projects, and the remaining 60 percent for renovation or expansion of existing facilities. Some of the projects involved were power-generating stations, coal mines, railroads, ports, airports, and raw-material production centers.

== Mining industry ==
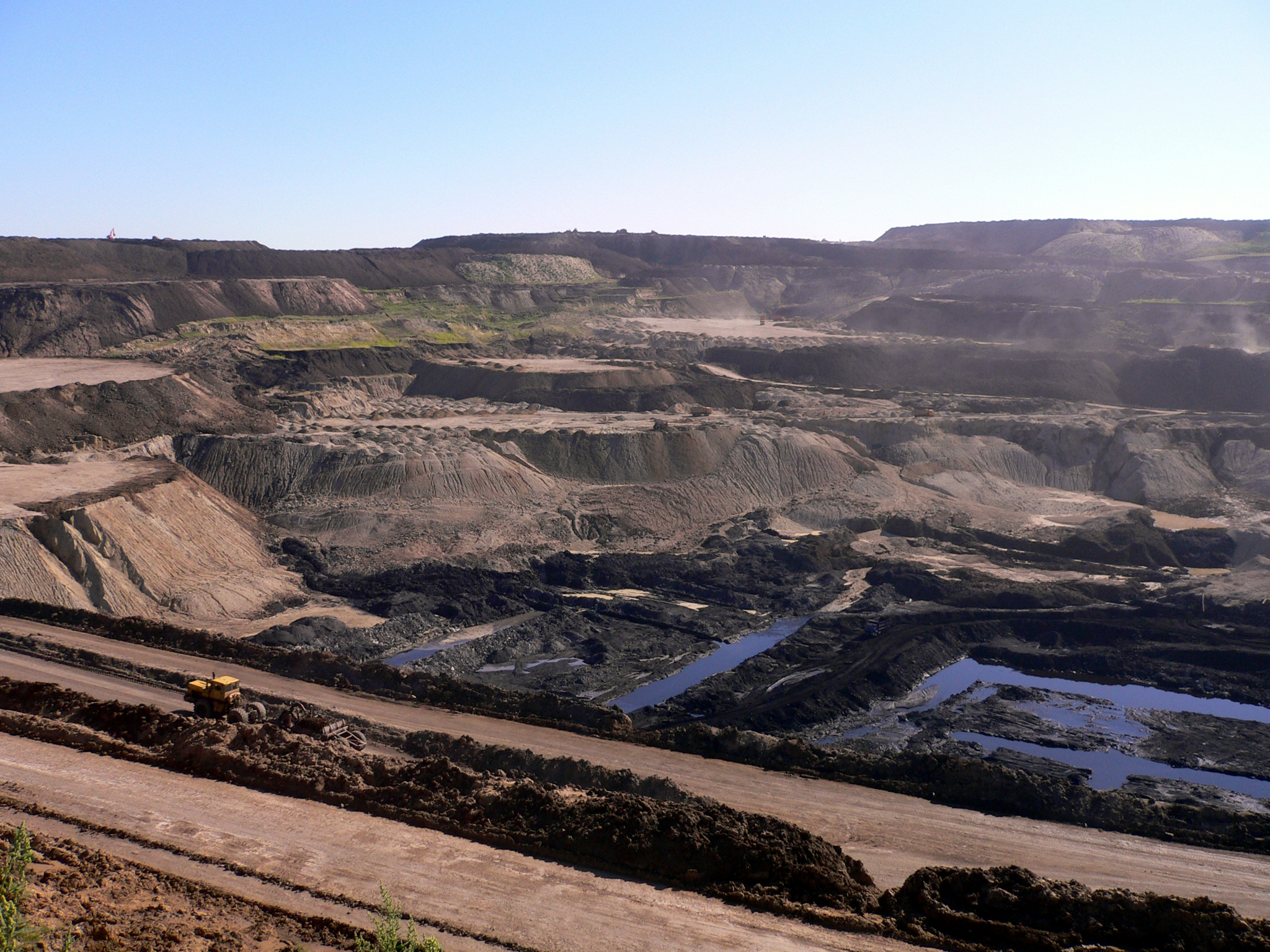
A coal mine near Hailar District

As of 2022, more than 200 types of minerals are actively explored or mined in the People's Republic of China (PRC). These resources are widely but not evenly distributed throughout the country. Taken as a whole, China's economy and exports do not rely on the mining industry, but the industry is critical to various subnational governments of the PRC.

Mining is extensively regulated in the PRC and involves numerous regulatory bodies. The state owns all mineral rights, regardless of the ownership of the land on which the minerals are located. Mining rights can be obtained upon government approval, and payment of mining and prospecting fees.

During the Mao Zedong era, mineral exploration and mining was limited to state-owned enterprises and collectively owned enterprises and private exploration of mineral resources was largely prohibited. The industry was opened to private enterprises during the reform and opening up in the 1980s and became increasingly marketized in the 1990s. In the mid-2000s, the Chinese government sought to consolidate the industry due to concerns about underutilization of resources, workplace safety, and environmental harm. During that period, state-owned enterprises purchased smaller privately owned mines. China's mining industry grew substantially and the period from the early 2000s to 2012 is often referred to as a "golden decade" in the mining industry.

== Energy industry ==
=== Oil ===
The petroleum industry in China has evolved from small-scale exploration during the Qing dynasty to one of the largest in the world since the founding of the People's Republic of China. Domestic oil production began in earnest in the 1950s, with major discoveries such as the Daqing and Shengli oil fields transforming the country into a net oil exporter by the 1970s. However, rising domestic demand led China to become a net oil importer by 1993 and the world's largest oil importer by 2013. To safeguard its energy security, China has developed a large "Strategic Petroleum Reserve" and expanded foreign oil investments through state-owned enterprises. Oil remains a critical component of China's energy policy, economic planning, and geopolitical strategy.

== Defense industry ==
The military modernization program of the People's Liberation Army (PLA) which began in the late 1970s had three major focuses. First, under the political leadership of 3rd paramount leader Deng Xiaoping, the military became disengaged from civilian politics and, for the most part, resumed the political quiescence that characterized its pre-Cultural Revolution role. Deng reestablished civilian control over the military by appointing his supporters to key military leadership positions, by reducing the scope of the PLA's domestic non-military role, and by revitalizing the party political structure and ideological control system within the PLA.

== See also ==
- Economic history of China (1949–present)
- Economy of China
- History of agriculture in China
- List of companies of China
- List of countries by GDP sector composition
- Technological and industrial history of the United States
