= Beijing Food Research Institute =

Chinese food science institute

Beijing Food Research Institute (BFRI)
- 北京市食品研究所
- Abbreviation: BFRI
- Founded: 1963
- Type: Research institution
- Purpose: Food science research
- Headquarters: Beijing, China
- Services: Project consulting, scientific research, technology transfer

Beijing Food Research Institute (BFRI; Chinese: 北京市食品研究所) is a food science research institution in China.

== History ==
The institute was founded in 1963. Its success in providing both foreign and domestic investors with project consulting services has earned it a high reputation. In 1989 the know-how of instant enriched soy milk powder was transferred to Xuzhou W Food & Beverage Co. Ltd. Since 1997 BFRI has been supplying Xurisheng Group Co in Hebei Province with instant tea. In 1998 Beijing Tea Quality Supervision Station established under the BFRI and Tea Leaves Beverage Quality Assaying Center of China Commerce Association was approved by the State Bureau of Quality and Technical Supervision and started to render assaying services for the first batch of appointed tea stores, such as Zhangyiyuan Tea Company.

== Research department of BFRI ==
It carried out many state-level key scientific and technological projects in the 7th, 8th, and 9th Five-Year Plan periods, all of which have been put into practice in the food industry. Now it is focusing its efforts on membrane separation technology, biofermentation technique, microencapsulation technique, supercritical liquid extraction technique, extrusion technique, etc. BFRI has obtained more than 400 achievements in scientific research, including winning one State Spark Prize and nine State Science and Technology Progress Prizes, and gaining thirty-one state patents.

== Journal ==
China Food Publishing Co., Ltd. published its first issue in 1972. It was China's first food magazine, welcomed by the general public. Food Science published its first issue in 1980. In 1982 Chemical Abstract, the authoritative periodical in the US, started to carry abstracts derived from Food Science. In 1992, 1996 and 2000 it was successively chosen as one of the core periodicals for the food industry by the China State Commission of Science and Technology.

Food Abstract is the sole publication of its kind in China, covering a wide range of subjects on food research, production and teaching. Its subscribers include technical personnel, policy-makers and college students.

== See also ==
- 2008 Chinese milk scandal
