= Posters in North Korea =

Posters have been used in North Korea to spread information and promote government initiatives and ideologies. Propaganda posters have also attracted attention from abroad, both as concise examples of North Korean mass media and as a novelty due to the unusual nature of propaganda posters in the 21st century.

== History ==
As with examples of propaganda posters in other countries, North Korean propaganda posters have changed based on the priorities of the country's leadership. Posters have also been used by analysts abroad to track industrial and agricultural changes within the country.

North Korea's poster culture was majorly influenced by the poster cultures of China, Japan, and the Soviet Union. Early North Korean posters used "graphically sophisticated designs" which had slogans imposed on them.

According to Koen De Cesuter,

"From the 1950s onwards, one can detect a growing simplification in composition, drawing and colouring, which has become the hallmark of North Korean poster design. More than just a linear evolution towards this highly stylized poster design language, a gradual atrophy in styles is discernible, as posters developed into a unique art form –between graphic design and fine art – and the KWP articulated a specific discourse on poster culture practice."

North Korean posters have also reflected the country's international relations. Posters of the 1950s celebrated the accomplishments of the Soviet Union, and encouraged North Korean students to study abroad there. This shifted in the 1960s, as North Korea became more isolated and more emphasis was placed on Kim Il Sung.

Extensive research on North Korean posters remains limited, both due to lack of access and lack of preservation.

== Style ==
The style of North Korean posters has remained relatively stable since the 1950s, with strong influences from socialist realism. One museum director, discussing the exhibition of a private collection of North Korean posters in Hong Kong, noted "[The posters] all differ tremendously in color and the way they talk to you, but the composition of the images is quite constant throughout time". Poster composition commonly features a single individual in the foreground, speaking to the audience, who is juxtaposed with a well-defined background. The image is accompanied by slogans in a large font. Koen De Ceuster describes the North Korean poster style as such: "The uniqueness of its poster culture is to be found in the stylized depiction of characters in primary colours, along with shrill slogans, often coated in military jargon, dotted with exclamation marks". De Ceuster traces this style back to as early as 1962.

Posters feature both men and women, albeit in different contexts. In posters portraying the military, only men are portrayed as soldiers; however, women workers are featured prominently in posters promoting agriculture or industry initiatives. Generally, women's poses are more demure than men's poses. The specific industries depicted have shifted with time; for example, a 1962 poster depicts workers from the sectors of "construction, fishing, mining, textiles, agriculture and steel production," while one 2005 poster depicts "a metalworker in the lead, followed by a farmer, scientist, train driver and miner," and another 2005 poster depicts workers of the " agriculture, science, mining...steel industry and transportation" sectors. When depicting groups of workers, they are often led by soldiers or Party members. As for stances, "Piercing eyes and pointing fingers have become a recurrent theme in the most forceful posters."

Figures are often portrayed against city landmarks; a group of 1982 posters depict "the Juche Tower, the Victory Arch and the Grand People's Study House," all in Pyongyang. The city represents the "ideological heartland of the socialist state".

=== Symbolism ===
The Chollima horse is a recurring symbol of national growth.

Posters often use the five basic colors associated with the five elements in Korean culture: blue, red, yellow, white and black. Each of these colors has its own associations:

- Red: socialism, aggression, and passion
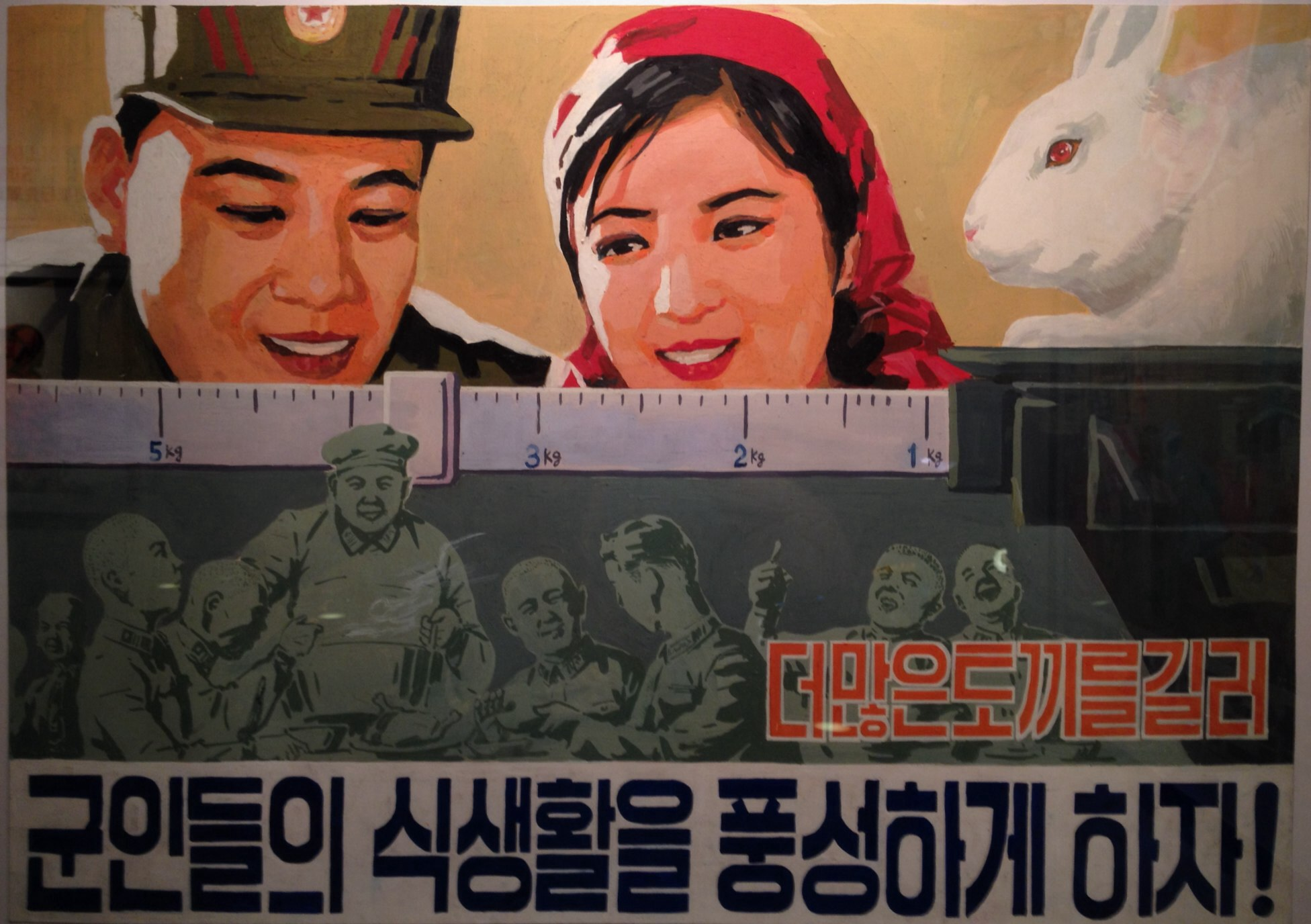
- A poster (c. 2013) promoting the breeding of rabbits for meat.
  Blue: peace, harmony, and integrity
- Black: darkness and evil
- Yellow: prosperity and glory

Blue is often used on educational posters, while black is often used in posters criticizing the United States or Japan.

== Production and distribution ==
Posters were historically hand-painted, a tradition which has continued into the 21st century. Most posters are printed at the government-run Mansudae Art Studio, which employs around a thousand artists. They are printed in limited runs. Local and national poster design contests have also been held, allowing for students and amateur artists to try their hand.

During the reign of Kim Jong Un, new posters have been released annually following Kim's annual New Year's Address, integrating slogans from his speech.

According to Koen de Ceuster, posters

"are printed and distributed for display on noticeboards in workplaces, schools, hospitals and other public spaces. Posters also appear in store windows or on announcement boards in public places, while some are painted on large billboards, and more recently even reproduced as mosaics. Posters are also reproduced in magazines, reprinted as postcards, or even as postage stamps."

== Subjects ==
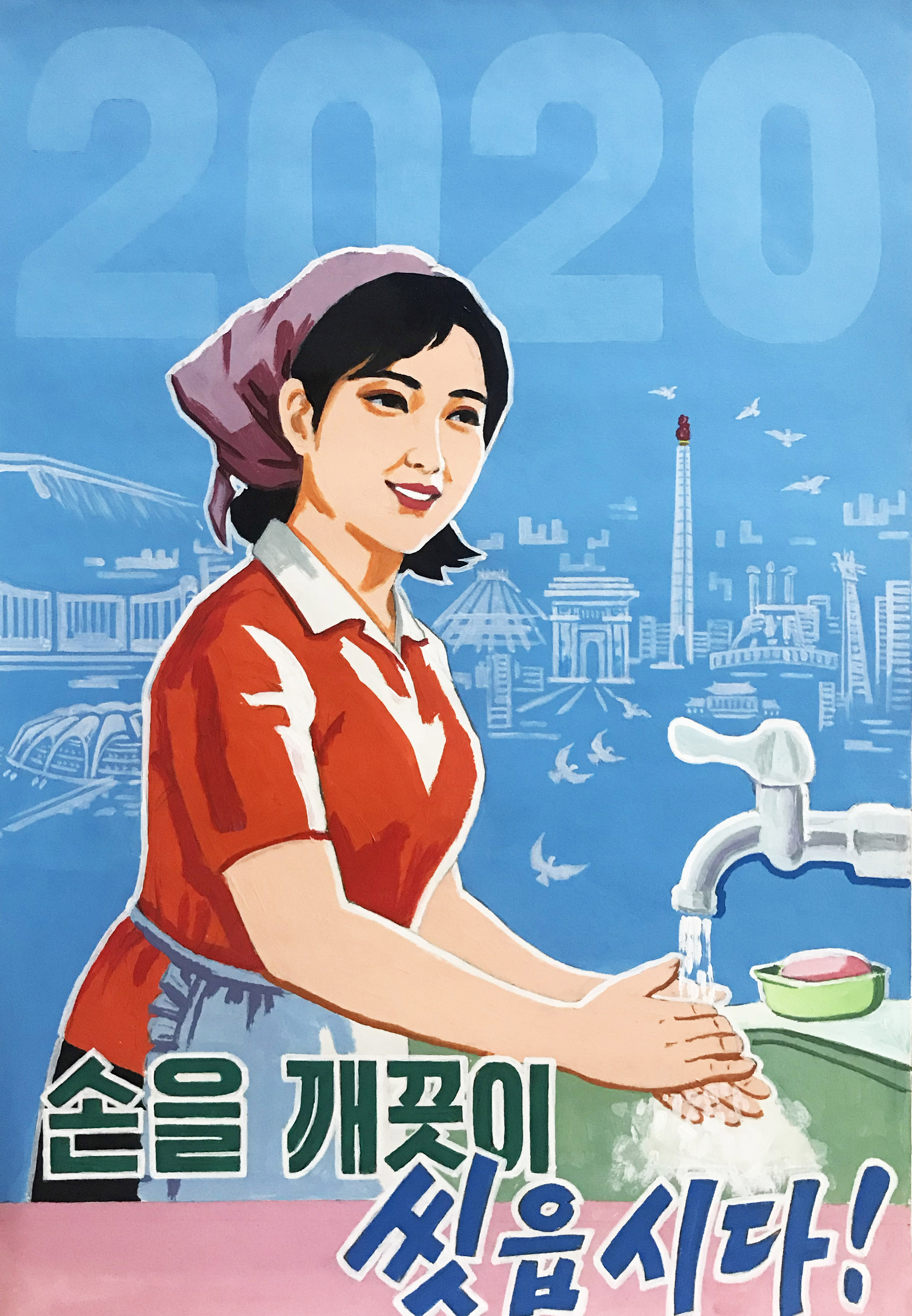
A poster promotes handwashing.

Posters have portrayed a variety of subjects, including agricultural, health, industrial, and military developments. Posters historically portrayed subjects such as the electrification of the country. In addition to sharing developments, posters have also encouraged residents to find ways to improve productivity, or sharing such methods, in fields like farming. Posters have also promoted the idea of Korean reunification and warned of the dangers of spies.

Posters have also been used to celebrate events, such as the anniversary of North Korea's founding.

On a more practical level, posters can be used to convey safety information, such as posters promoting traffic rules or a 1965 poster promoting awareness of the dangers of train crossings. Posters were created to distribute information during the COVID-19 pandemic.

In the 21st century, posters continue to be used to disseminate information to the public, due to the limited nature of North Korean social media. For example, posters were created to disseminate information on the 2008 National Census Day, telling residents to stay home so they could speak with census workers. Other posters are used to encourage tree-planting or discourage smoking.

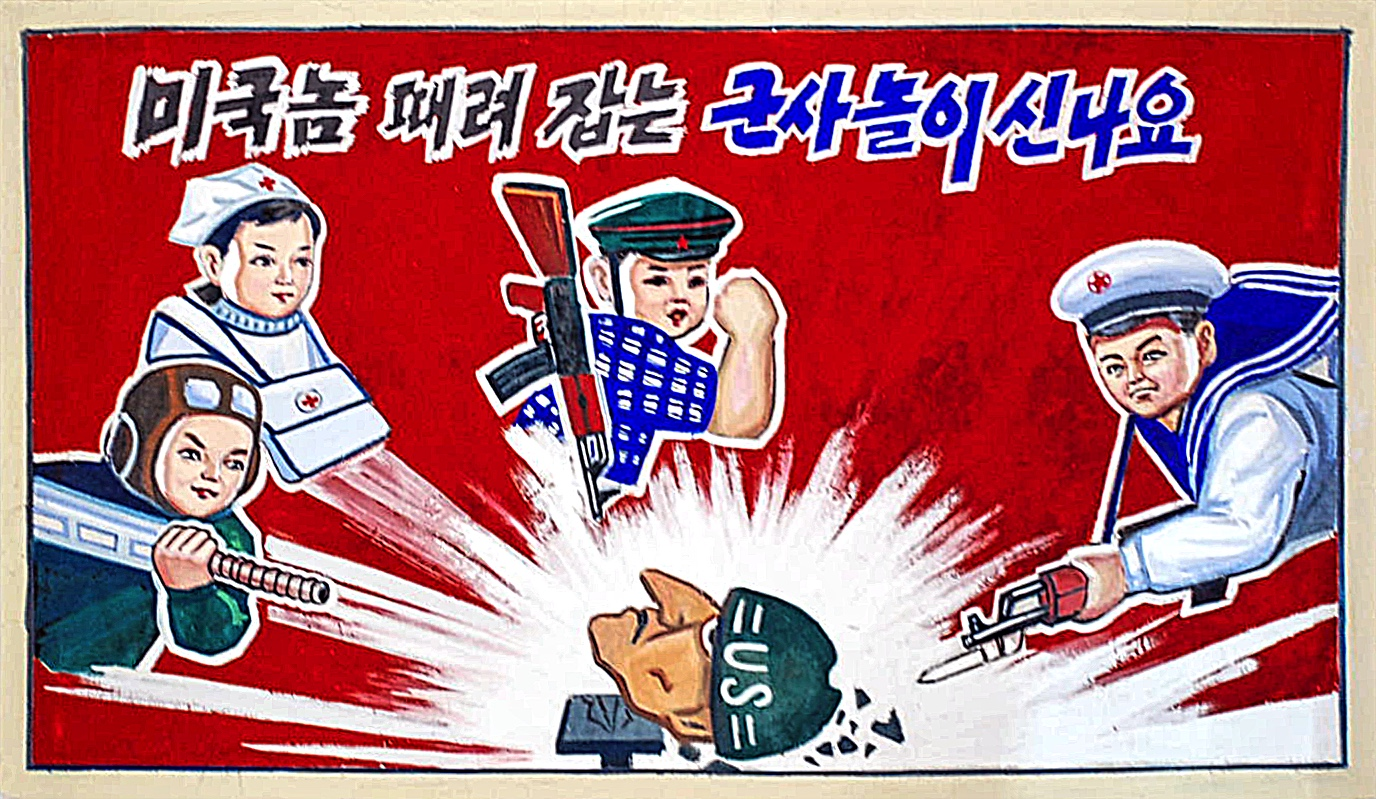
A poster reading "Are you excited about the military game of beating up Americans?"

North Korean posters have attracted the attention of Western media for their promotion of militarism and their anti-American, anti-Japanese, and anti-South Korean messages. Nuclear missiles have been a common subject in contemporary military posters, although they were not depicted in posters between 2017 and 2022.
