= You Longgu =

Chinese poster illustrator (1923–1995)

- 游龙姑
- Born: 1923; Fuzhou, Fujian, China
- Died: 1995 (aged 71–72)
- Education: National Central University
- Known for: Propaganda posters

Chinese name
- Traditional Chinese: 游龍姑
- Simplified Chinese: 游龙姑
Transcriptions
Standard Mandarin
- Hanyu Pinyin: Yóu Lónggū
- Wade–Giles: Yu Lungku

You Longgu (Chinese: 游龙姑, 1923–1995) was a Chinese illustrator best known for creating an extensive collection of popular propaganda posters for Mao Zedong's communist party from 1955 until 1974, both prior to and during the cultural revolution.

== Biography ==
You Longgu was born in Fuzhou in Fujian, China in 1923.

She received an education in traditional oil painting at National Central University in Nanjing, China in the 1940s, where she was heavily influenced by the style of artist Xu Beihong. Soon after leaving university, she joined the social branch of the People's Liberation Army and began working as an art teacher. In 1955, an arts publishing house in Shanghai invited You to join their newly created propaganda poster team as an illustrator and designer. While in school, she fell in love with fellow artist Ha Qiongwen and they were married, eventually having at least one son. The pair spent many years working together at the same publishing house.

You's husband Ha Qiongwen created one of the most famous propaganda posters of the era, Long Live Chairman Mao!, in 1959. Though popular amongst citizens, the design was criticized by the Chinese Communist Party (CCP) for dark colors and for containing no imagery of Mao Zedong himself. As a result, the family was regularly targeted by the media. Ha was once beaten and humiliated by Red Guards in front of tens of thousands of onlookers, and You was sent to a "reform farm" in a governmental effort to fix what were seen as problems with the family.

You Longgu died in her early 70s in 1995.

== Work ==
Millions of copies of You Longgu's posters were printed and distributed by the Government of China for nearly two decades between 1955 and 1974. Original reproductions of her illustrations are held in the collections of numerous international institutions, including the Propaganda Poster Art Centre in Shanghai, and the International Institute of Social History in Amsterdam.
