= Thematic consultative seminar =

Chinese political advisory meeting

A thematic consultative seminar (Chinese: 专题协商会; pinyin: Zhuāntí xiéshāng huì) is a periodic gathering of the National Committee of the Chinese People's Political Consultative Conference (CPPCC).

== History ==
From July 11 to 12, 2005, the CPPCC held its first special consultation meeting to offer suggestions and advice on the formulation of the 11th Five-Year Plan and the long-term goals for 2020. CPPCC Chairman Jia Qinglin attended the meeting and delivered a speech, pointing out that this special consultation meeting was a new form of political consultation activities carried out by the 10th CPPCC National Committee under the new situation, and was of great significance for exploring and promoting the institutionalization, standardization and proceduralization of the CPPCC's performance of its functions.

Since then, the 10th and 11th CPPCC National Committees have held 11 special consultation meetings. Special consultation meetings and special policy-making Standing Committee meetings are the unique and important brands of the 10th and 11th CPPCC National Committees. The 12th CPPCC National Committee has increased the intensity of special policy-making Standing Committee meetings and special consultation meetings in accordance with the special content of consultation. Special consultation usually refers to "a form of consultation and discussion between the CPPCC and the heads of the government and relevant departments on an important issue in economic and social development, based on in-depth research, by providing a platform for the CPPCC organization and taking meetings as the main form." Since the 12th CPPCC National Committee, the special consultation of the CPPCC National Committee has been divided into two levels: the first level is the special policy-making Standing Committee meetings and special consultation meetings, and the second level is the biweekly consultation forum.

On May 14, 2015, the 29th Chairman's Meeting of the 12th National Committee of the CPPCC adopted the "Working Methods of the Special Consultation Meetings of the CPPCC National Committee", which further institutionalized, standardized and proceduralized the work of the special consultation meetings of the CPPCC National Committee. According to the provisions of the methods, "the special consultation meeting is a meeting form in which the CPPCC National Committee organizes CPPCC Standing Committee members and CPPCC members to discuss and make suggestions on a specific issue in the economy, politics, culture, society, ecological civilization and party building around the major policies of the country. It is the main vehicle for carrying out special consultations of the CPPCC and an important platform for the CPPCC to play its role as an important channel for deliberative democracy and a special consultation institution and to assist the party and the government in making scientific and democratic decisions." "The special consultation meeting is chaired by the Chairman of the CPPCC National Committee or the Vice Chairman entrusted by the Chairman." "It is generally held twice a year for one day, scheduled in the second and third quarters respectively."

Since the National Committee of the CPPCC launched thematic consultation meetings, local CPPCC committees have also adopted thematic consultation meetings as an important form of CPPCC consultation work.
