= Posters in China =

Since the early 20th century, posters have been used in China as ways to spread information and to promote values, ideologies, and government projects, especially following the establishment of the People's Republic of China. Printmaking in China has a long history, with 20th century posters both building on and breaking from this history. Other later influences included World War II-era European political posters and European Communist posters.

== Republic of China (1912-1949) ==
During the 1911 Revolution, propaganda posters served both to encourage support for the revolution and as a way to illustrate battles and other events for the public.

As early as 1914, but increasingly in the 1920s and 1930s, posters were primarily used by companies advertising products, rather than the government. Advertisement posters tended to use a pastel color palette and realistic illustrations of children and glamorous women. Chinese poster artists of this era did not adopt the more avant-garde styles of European poster artists of the same period.

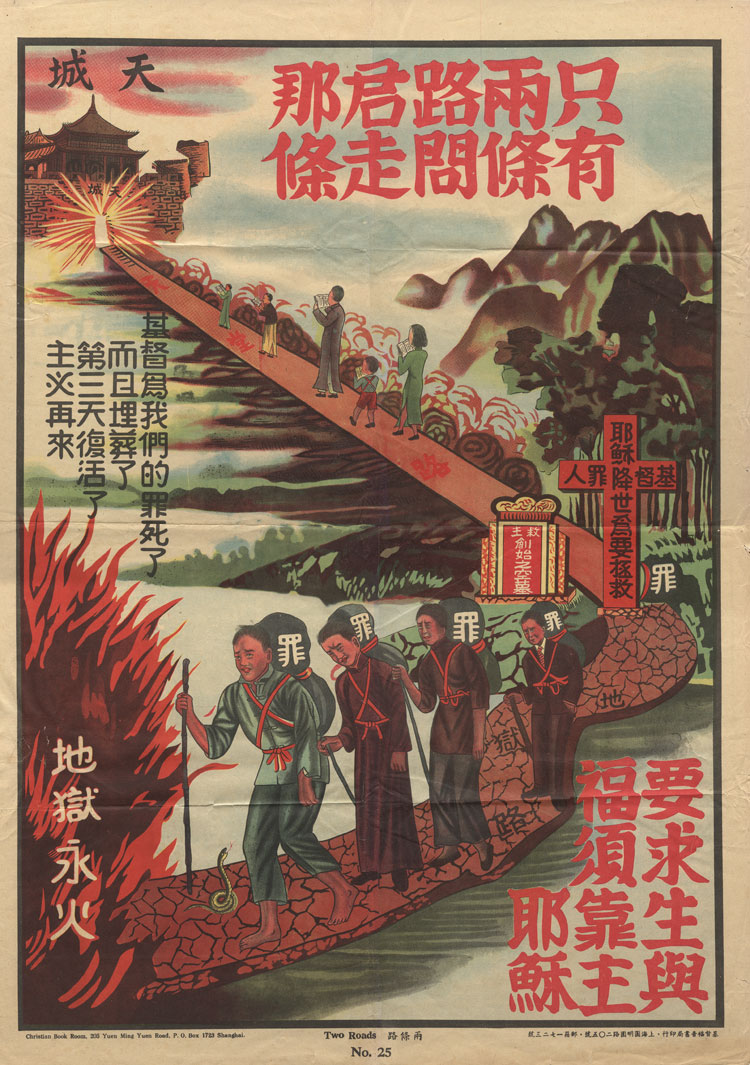
Christian poster c. 1930, depicting the roads to heaven and hell

From 1927 until 1949, posters were used by Chinese Christians and Christian missionaries to evangelize.

In the late 1930s, the Chinese government did make use of posters in the run-up to and during the Second Sino-Japanese War.

== People's Republic of China ==
=== 1949-1966 ===
With the establishment of the People's Republic of China, Mao "called upon all of China’s painters...to participate actively in a campaign...to change the form and purpose of New Year pictures," a traditional form of decoration used during Chinese New Year. Thus, early propaganda posters in the PRC tended to meld traditional imagery with political messaging. As the propaganda poster was an unfamiliar form to many of the involved artist, these early posters were "remarkable in their variety".

Shanghai artists, who had already worked to produce calendars, were especially influenced "by the realism and subject matter of Western visual art". Shanghai artists were also responsible for some of the "earliest propaganda images of Mao".

Subject matter tended to focus on immediate minutia of daily life, rather than fantastical scenes, and featured farmers and farm workers. Mao Zedong was also a recurring subject, serving to further his cult of personality.

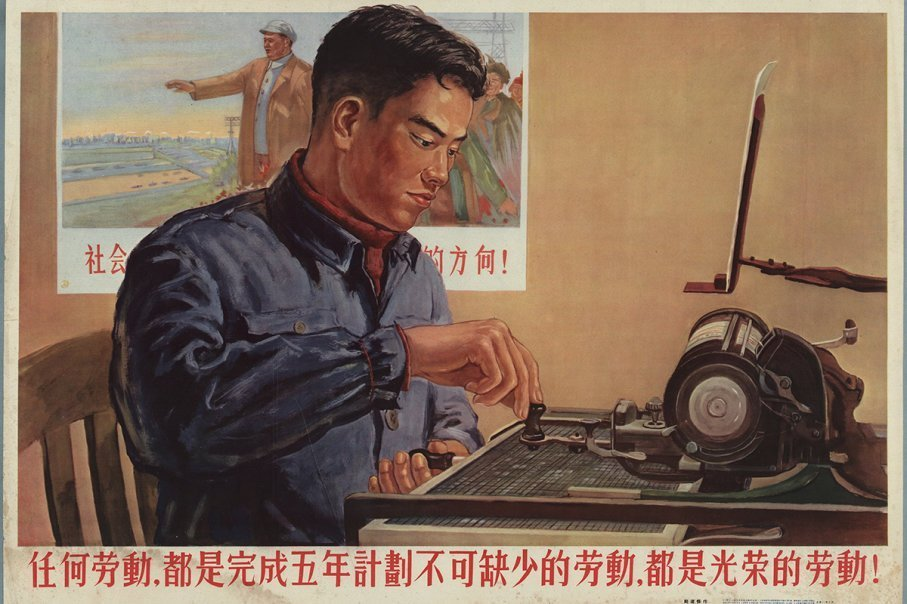
1956 poster, with text reading: "Whatever work aims to complete and not to fail the Five Year Plan, all that work Is glorious!"

With time, government-produced propaganda posters adopted the socialist realism style, following the lead of the Soviet Union. However, artists broke from socialist realism during the Great Leap Forward (1958–1962), returning to a "specifically Chinese style".

The early 1960s saw the emergence of space and the Space Race as a theme in posters. This theme would continue to be present in posters into the 1980s, often combined with nianhua, fantastic, or mythological imagery.

=== Cultural Revolution (1966-1976) ===
During the Cultural Revolution, posters reached their peak usage in China. Art during the Cultural Revolution, including posters, was expected to follow several guidelines. These included:

1. The use of "new, modern Chinese" styles, rather than Classical Chinese styles or Western styles
2. Promoting the creation of art by traditionally non-creative groups, such as workers, peasants, and soldiers; ethnic minorities also saw some limited encouragement in the arts scene
3. Performing some sort of productive function, rather than "art for art's sake"

Most poster production was controlled by the Cultural Revolution Small Group, headed by Jiang Qing. As a result, most posters from this period follow "a very formulaic and tightly defined visual style".

Artists continued to follow the lead of the Soviet Union, with poster art centering on central figures or groups of figures. Red was an extremely common color. Images were accompanied by text in bold fonts, with messages such as "'working hard', 'uniting for victory' and 'working towards the general communist goal'". Subject matter focused on "industrial progress, self-improvement and public health," showing scenes such as urban youth working on countryside farms. Figures besides Mao tended to be generic tropes of farmer, soldier, and worker, and were usually depicted with happy expressions. Woodcut prints became especially popular due to how quickly they could be produced and their simple yet eye-catching images.

Typography on posters was largely "simple and unimaginative", perhaps due to technological limitations on the majority of printing presses.

Most posters from this era are attributed to groups rather than individuals. Some of the posters were commissioned by New China News Agency. Organizations that printed posters included the Shanghai People's Fine Arts Publishing House and Xinjiang Art Publishing House.

Posters were printed extensively and made available for low costs, and people were encouraged to put posters up in their homes. Many were sold at New China Bookstores across the country.

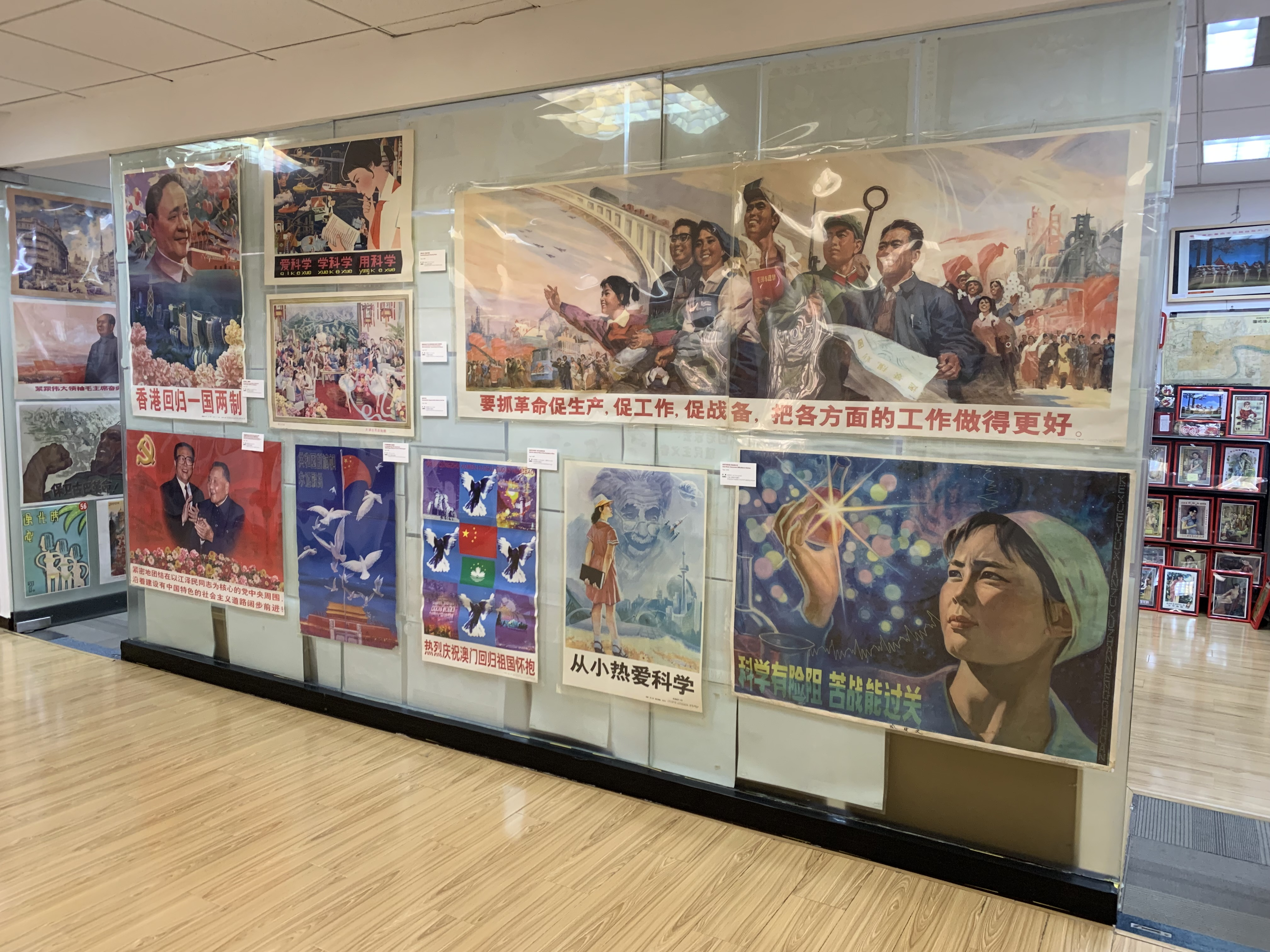
Variety of propaganda posters at the Propaganda Poster Art Centre in Shanghai

=== 1976 and onwards ===
After 1976, as Deng Xiaoping's foreign policy allowed for more connection to the world outside China, poster artists became more experimental, drawing on non-Chinese and non-Soviet art movements such as Scandinavian design and surrealism. Artists also gained more freedom, now being able to work for advertising firms rather than solely the Chinese government.

Propaganda posters began to wane in usage in the 1980s, and by the 1990s were being "discarded en masse".

In the 1980s, posters were used to spread messages of environmentalism. Many such posters focused on immediate and personal action, such as picking up litter or the planting of and caring for trees.

In the 1990s and 2000s, propaganda posters addressing space technology adopted more militaristic imagery, moving away from the more fantastic theming of earlier space posters.

== See also ==
- Propaganda Poster Art Centre
