= 10th Five-Year Plan (China) =

Chinese economic development plan, 2001–2005

China
- 10th Five-Year Plan
- Full name: 10th Five-Year Plan for National Economic and Social Development of the People's Republic of China
- Start date: 2001
- End date: 2005

Economic targets
- Average GDP growth rate: 9.775%
- GDP at start: CN¥9.921 trillion
- GDP at end: CN¥18.230 trillion
← 9th	11th →

10th Five-Year Plan
- Simplified Chinese: 第十个五年计划
- Traditional Chinese: 第十個五年計劃
Transcriptions
Standard Mandarin
- Hanyu Pinyin: Dìshígè Wǔnián Jìhuà

10th Five-Year Plan for National Economic and Social Development of the People's Republic of China
- Simplified Chinese: 中华人民共和国国民经济和社会发展第十个五年计划
- Traditional Chinese: 中華人民共和國國民經濟社會發展第十個五年計劃
Transcriptions
Standard Mandarin
- Hanyu Pinyin: Zhōnghuá Rénmín Gònghéguó Guómín Jīngjì hé Shèhuì Fāzhǎn Dìshígè Wǔnián Jìhuà

The 10th Five-Year Plan, officially the 10th Five-Year Plan for National Economic and Social Development of the People's Republic of China, was a plan for China's national economic and social development for the 2001-2005 period. With economic development as its main goal, the plan establishes the strategic adjustment of the economic structure as its main line, while focusing on ecological construction, environmental protection, and sustainable economic and social development. Various social programs such as education, culture, healthcare and sports were also emphasized.

== Formulation ==
In October 2000, the Fifth Plenary Session of the 15th Central Committee of the Chinese Communist Party adopted the "Proposals of the Central Committee of the Communist Party of China on the Formulation of the 10th Five-Year Plan for National Economic and Social Development". In March 2001, the Fourth Session of the 9th National People's Congress, on top of the achievements of the 9th Five-Year Plan, deliberated on and adopted the "Outline of the 10th Five-Year Plan for National Economic and Social Development". The 10th Five-Year Plan was China's first economic plan of the new millennium to be situated in the context of globalization.

== Objectives ==
The Outline of the plan mentioned the following objectives to be achieved in the context of the China's situation at the time:

- Maintain price stability and balance of payments.
- Promote the optimization and upgrading of industrial structure and enhance international competitiveness.
- Improve the level of informatization of the national economy and society.
- Promote the smooth progress of more infrastructure construction.
- Effectively control the regional development gap and raise the level of urbanization.
- Enhance scientific and technological innovation capacity and accelerate technological progress.
- Strengthen the protection and conservation of natural resources.
- Improve urban and rural medical and health services, enrich people's cultural life, and improve social morality and social security.

Specific construction indicators include:

- Achieving an average annual economic growth of about 7%.
- Within five years, GDP will reach 12.5 trillion yuan at 2000 prices, and per capita GDP will reach 9,400 yuan.
- The scale of urban employment and the transfer of surplus rural labor force will each reach more than 40 million people, and the urban registered unemployment rate will be controlled at around 5%.
- The added value of the primary, secondary and tertiary industries will account for 13%, 51% and 36% of GDP respectively, and the number of employees in the primary, secondary and tertiary industries will account for 44%, 23% and 33% of the country's employees respectively.
- Investment in research and experimental development will be raised to more than 1.5% of GDP.
- The gross enrollment rate in junior middle school will reach over 90%, the gross enrollment rate in senior middle school will reach over 60%, and the gross enrollment rate in higher education will reach over 15%.
- The natural population growth rate will be controlled at 9% or less, and the total population in 2005 will be controlled at 1.33 billion or less.
- The forest coverage rate will reach 18.2%, the urban green space rate will reach 35%, and the total amount of major pollutants discharged in urban and rural areas will be reduced by 10% compared with 2000.
- The disposable income of urban residents and the net income of rural residents will each increase by about 5%, the per capita housing floor space of urban residents will reach 22 square meters by 2005, and the national cable TV household rate will reach 40%.

== Achievements ==
In 2005, China's GDP exceeded 15 trillion yuan, with a five-year average growth rate of 8.8%; fiscal revenue amounted to about 3 trillion yuan, an increase of 1.3 times that of the 1,339.5 billion yuan in 2000. The major development goals set out in the Tenth five-year plan were realized ahead of schedule, and the overall price level remained basically stable, laying a good foundation for development in the eleventh five-year plan period.

Shanghai's One City, Nine Towns initiative was designated as the flagship urban development program for the tenth five-year plan period.

Preceded by 9th Plan; 1996 – 2000	10th Five-Year Plan; 2001–2005	Succeeded by 11th Plan; 2006 – 2010
