= 5th Five-Year Plan (China) =

Chinese economic development plan (1975–1980)

China
- 5th Five-Year Plan
- Start date: 1976
- End date: 1980

Economic targets
- Average GDP growth rate: 6.6%
- Industrial and agricultural growth rate: 8.7%
- GDP at start: CN¥296.147 billion
- GDP at end: CN¥454.562 billion
← 4th	6th →

5th Five-Year Plan
- Simplified Chinese: 第五个五年计划
- Traditional Chinese: 第五個五年計劃
Transcriptions
Standard Mandarin
- Hanyu Pinyin: Dìwǔgè Wǔnián Jìhuà

The 5th Five-Year Plan was China's national economic development plan for the years 1976 to 1980. The draft plan was developed in 1975 in conjunction with the draft of the sixth five-year plan. It was significantly revised in 1977 before being formalized in December 1977. The primary goal of the plan was to establish an autonomous industrial system and comprehensively restructure the national economy.

== Objectives ==
The fifth five-year Plan was not an independent five-year plan in the strictest sense of the term; rather, it was a component of a 10-year development plan that was established in 1975. The draft, which was initially proposed, not only aimed to reverse the deteriorating financial situation but also advocated for the complete mechanization of agriculture throughout the nation. It also established explicit requirements for the values of steel and petroleum production, as well as non-ferrous metal bases, coal bases, oil and gas fields, iron and steel bases, and power generation. Nevertheless, these objectives were determined to be "grossly beyond the capacity of construction" during the program's execution. The Fifth five-year plan was significantly revised during the 3rd plenary session of the 11th Central Committee of the Chinese Communist Party. It was not until December 1977 that an official document was issued for its implementation. In April 1979, the 11th Central Committee of the Chinese Communist Party formally announced the guideline of "Adjustment, Reform, Rectification, and Enhancement" at its work conference in order to gradually restructure the national economy.

== Accomplishments ==
For two consecutive years following the revision of the fifth five-year plan in 1977 and 1978, the gross social output value, industrial and agricultural output value, and national income experienced a significant increase. Additionally, the output of major industrial and agricultural products either surpassed or recovered its highest level in history. The level of industrialization was increased after the two years of adjustment in 1979 and 1980.

Preceded by 4th Plan; 1971 – 1975	5th Five-Year Plan; 1976 – 1980	Succeeded by 6th Plan; 1981 – 1985
