= 8th Five-Year Plan (China) =

Chinese economic development plan (1991–1995)

China
- 8th Five-Year Plan
- Full name: Ten-Year Plan for National Economic and Social Development and the 8th Five-Year Plan of the People's Republic of China
- Start date: 1990
- End date: 1995

Economic targets
- Average GDP growth rate: 12.3%
- GDP at start: CN¥2.178 trillion
- GDP at end: CN¥6.079 trillion
← 7th	9th →

8th Five-Year Plan
- Simplified Chinese: 第八个五年计划
- Traditional Chinese: 第八個五年計劃
Transcriptions
Standard Mandarin
- Hanyu Pinyin: Dìbāgè Wǔnián Jìhuà

Ten-Year Plan for National Economic and Social Development and the 8th Five-Year Plan of the People's Republic of China
- Simplified Chinese: 中华人民共和国国民经济和社会发展十年规划和第八个五年计划
- Traditional Chinese: 中華人民共和國國民經濟社會發展十年規劃和第八個五年計劃
Transcriptions
Standard Mandarin
- Hanyu Pinyin: Zhōnghuá Rénmín Gònghéguó Guómín Jīngjì hé Shèhuì Fāzhǎn Shínián Guīhuà hé Dìbāgè Wǔnián Jìhuà

The 8th Five-Year Plan, officially the Ten-Year Plan for National Economic and Social Development and the 8th Five-Year Plan of the People's Republic of China, was China's eighth national economic development plan from 1990 to 1995. When the formulation of the Eighth Five-Year Plan started in 1990, due to the Tiananmen Incident, China was undergoing a three-year comprehensive rectification and reorganizing of its economy. Major Western countries were also imposing economic sanctions on China.

In the beginning, the plan was designed to enhance the standard of living of the populace and the value of industrial and agricultural output. However, in 1992, Deng Xiaoping introduced the concept of a socialist market economy during an inspection tour of Guangdong Province. Subsequently, the 14th National Congress of the Chinese Communist Party modified the plan's development objectives to emphasize the restructuring of the economic industry and the economic system, which initiated a new era in China's five-year plan objectives.

== Objectives ==
In December 1990, the Seventh Session of the 13th Central Committee of the Chinese Communist Party reviewed and adopted the "Proposal of the CPC Central Committee on Formulating the Ten-Year National Economic and Social Development Plan and the Eighth Five-Year Plan". In March 1991, the Fourth Session of the Seventh National People's Congress reviewed and adopted the State Council's "Report on the Ten-Year National Economic and Social Development Plan and the Outline of the Eighth Five-Year Plan". The plan's specific economic objectives, in addition to the macro-objectives of enhancing the economy and individuals' livelihoods. The State Council revised the five-year plan in 1993 following Deng Xiaoping's southern tour and the 14th National Congress of the Chinese Communist Party. The plan was revised to increase the projected growth rate of the national economy, increase the proportion of infrastructure construction and energy industry, and expand the proportion of foreign trade and attract foreign investment.

== Results ==
This five-year plan achieved economic growth and basically achieved the revised goals. This Five-Year Plan also exposed the issues of sloppy management, poor economic efficiency, a fragile agricultural foundation, and the inability of state-owned enterprises to transition to the socialist market economy.

== See also ==
- Socialist market economy
- Deng Xiaoping's southern tour

Preceded by 7th Plan; 1986 – 1990	8th Five-Year Plan; 1991 – 1995	Succeeded by 9th Plan; 1996 – 2000
