= East China =

Geographical region of China

- Region
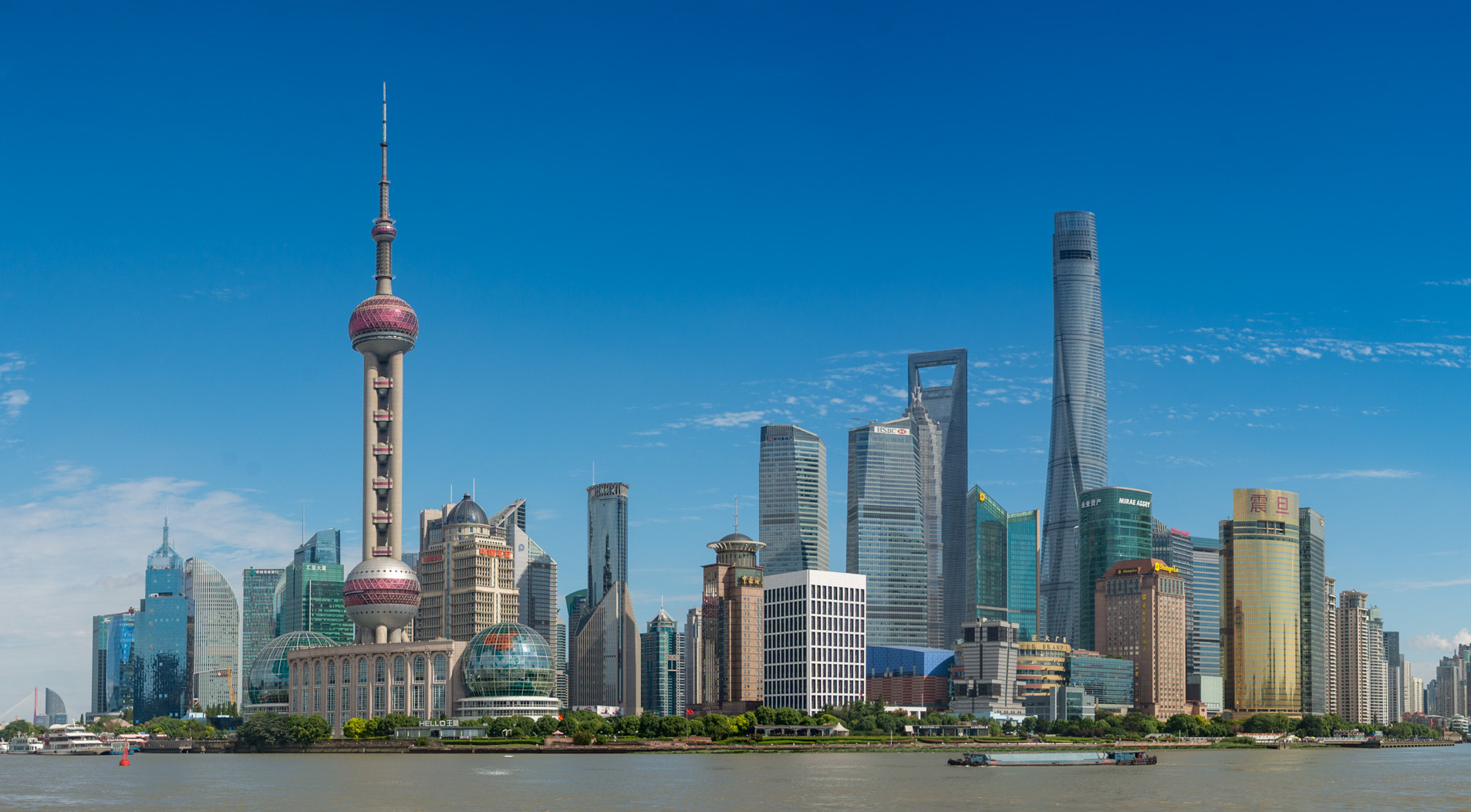
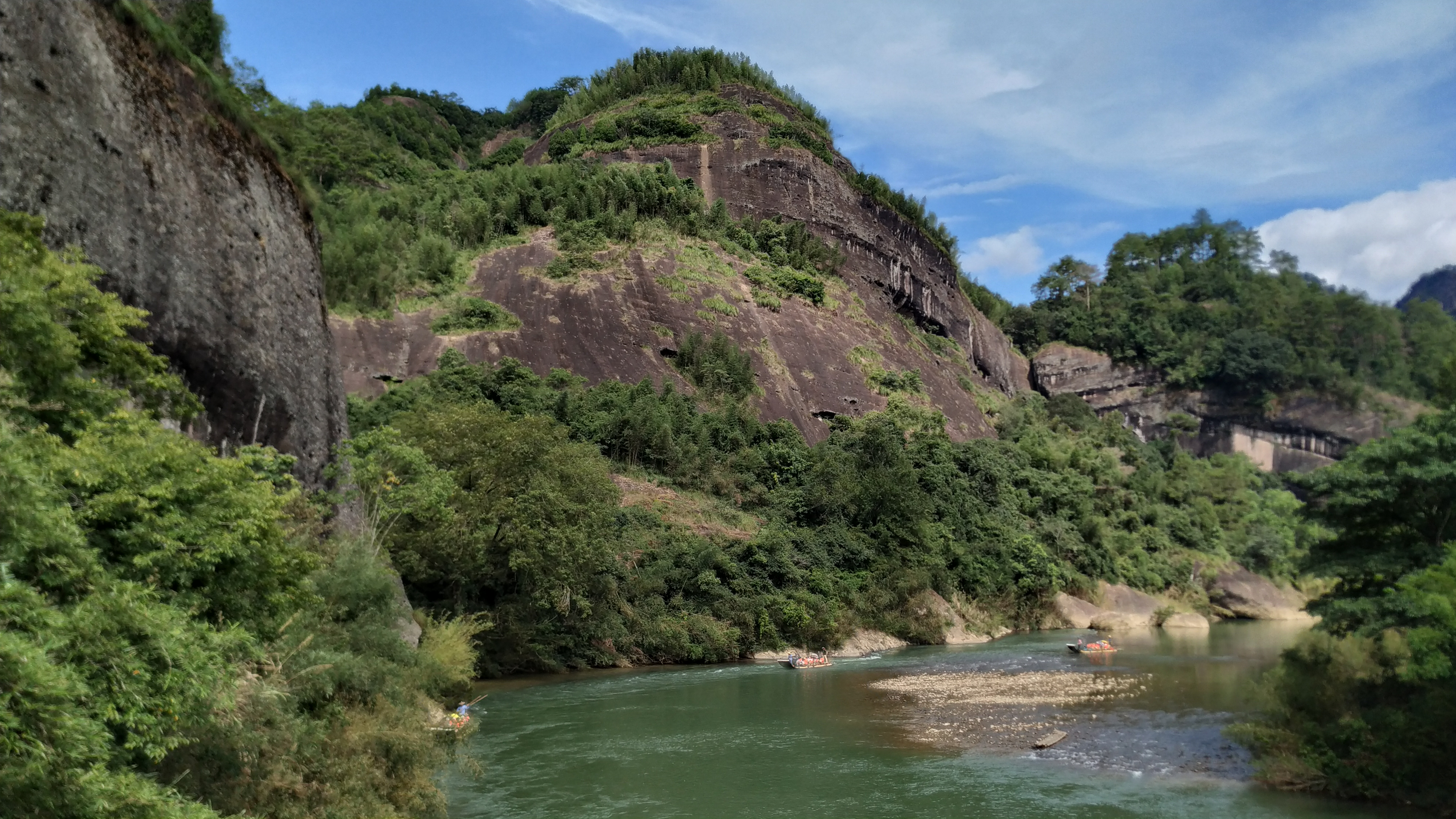
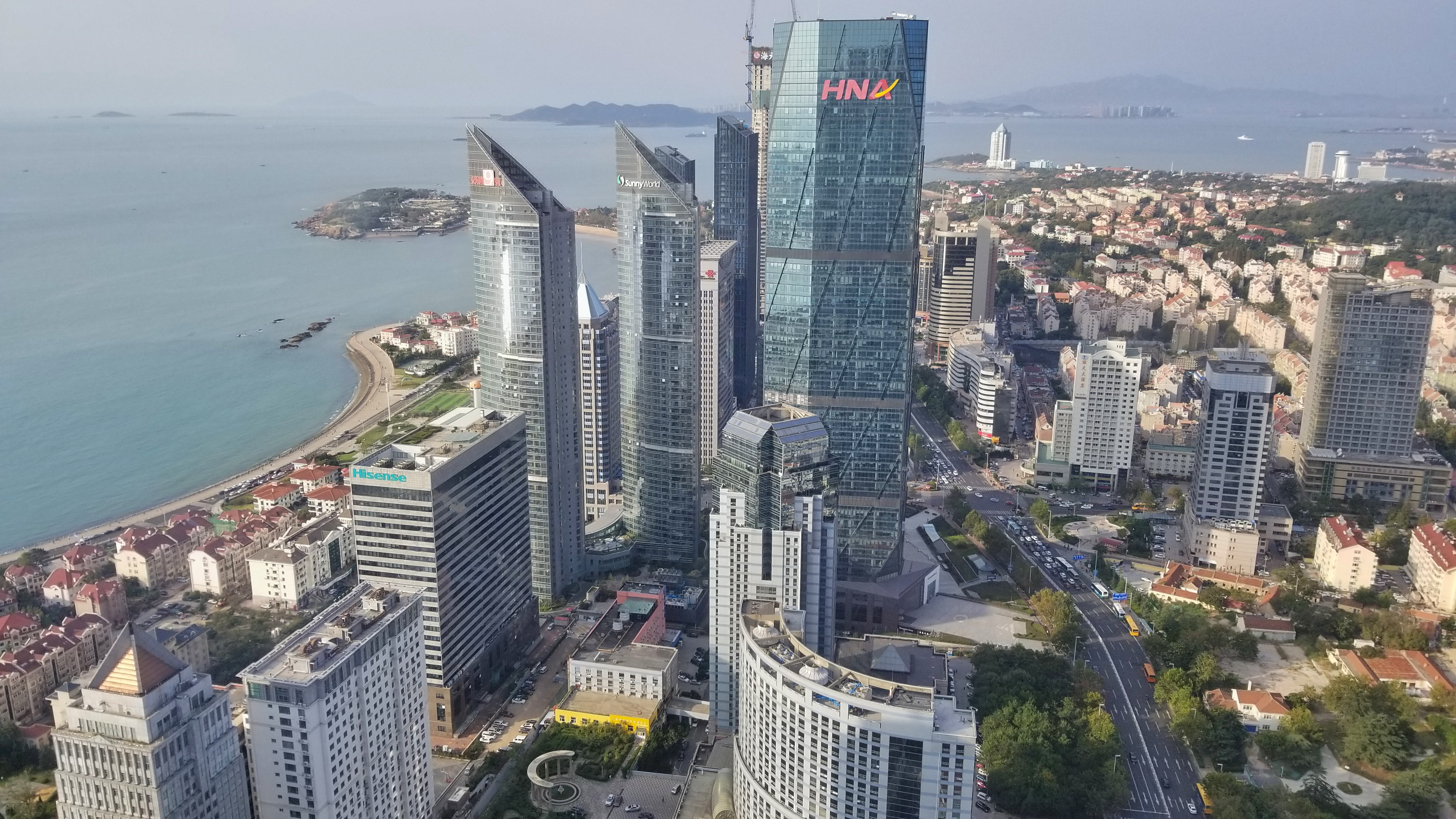
- Lujiazui CBD Wuyi Mountains West Lake Qingdao

- Country: China

Area
  - Total: 795,837 km^{2} (307,274 sq mi)

Population (2024)
  - Total: 425,784,000
  - Density: 483/km^{2} (1,250/sq mi)
- GDP: 2024
- Total: CN¥52.22 trillion (US$8.1 trillion)
- Per capita: CN¥122,647 (US$19,015.04)
- Largest city: Shanghai

East China (Chinese: 华东; pinyin: huá dōng) is a geographical region in the People's Republic of China, mainly consisting of seven province-level administrative divisions, namely the provinces (from north to south) Shandong, Jiangsu, Anhui, Zhejiang, Jiangxi, Fujian, and the direct-administered municipality Shanghai.

The region was defined in 1945 as the jurisdiction area of the Central Committee's East China Bureau (华东局), which was a merger politburo agency of the Shandong Bureau and the Central China Bureau previously established during the Second Sino-Japanese War. After the founding of the People's Republic of China, the region included all the aforementioned provinces except Jiangxi, which was previously considered part of South Central China before being reassigned in 1961. The East China Bureau was abolished in 1966 due to the Cultural Revolution, but in 1970 the fourth five-year plan redefined the region as the East China Coordinated Region (华东协作区), which supported the logistics of the Jinan and Nanjing Military Regions. This geographical definition was retained after the economic reform of the 1980s.

Since the Chinese Government claims sovereignty over Taiwan and the few outlying islands of Fujian (Kinmen and Matsu), which have been ruled by the exiled Government of the Republic of China (who fled to Taiwan after losing the Chinese Civil War in 1949) as its own territory, the nominal "Taiwan Province, People's Republic of China" is also classified in this region.

== Administrative divisions ==
GB	ISO No. 3166-2:CN	Province	Chinese Name	Capital	Population (2020 census)	Density	Area	Abbreviation	Abbreviation in Chinese
Hù	31	Shanghai Municipality	上海市; Shànghǎi Shì	Shanghai	24,870,895	3,922.24	6,341	SH	沪
Sū	32	Jiangsu Province	江苏省; Jiāngsū Shěng	Nanjing	84,748,016	847.91	102,600	JS	苏
Zhè	33	Zhejiang Province	浙江省; Zhèjiāng Shěng	Hangzhou	64,567,588	615.67	102,000	ZJ	浙
Wǎn	34	Anhui Province	安徽省; Ānhuī Shěng	Hefei	61,027,171	436.29	139,700	AH	皖
Mǐn	35	Fujian Province	福建省; Fújiàn Shěng	Fuzhou	41,540,086	335.66	121,300	FJ	闽
Gàn	36	Jiangxi Province	江西省; Jiāngxī Shěng	Nanchang	45,188,635	270.69	167,000	JX	赣
Lǔ	37	Shandong Province	山东省; Shāndōng Shěng	Jinan	101,527,453	643.78	153,800	SD	鲁
Tái	71	Taiwan Province (Note: The People's Republic of China considers Taiwan to be its 23rd province, but Taiwan is currently administrated by the Republic of China. Since 1945, the ROC only controls the island of Taiwan and Penghu. For Kinmen and Matsu, see note on Fujian Province. See also Political status of Taiwan)	台湾省; Táiwān Shěng	Taipei	23,162,123	650.97	36,161	TW	台

== Cities with urban area over one million in population ==
Provincial capitals in bold.

#	City	Urban area	District area	City proper	Prov.	Census date
1	**Shanghai**	20,217,748	22,315,474	23,019,196	SH	2010-11-01
2	**Nanjing**	5,827,888	7,165,292	8,003,744	JS	2010-11-01
3	**Hangzhou**	5,162,093	6,241,971	8,700,373	ZJ	2010-11-01
4	**Jinan**	3,527,566	4,335,989	6,813,984	SD	2010-11-01
5	Qingdao	3,519,919	3,718,835	8,715,087	SD	2010-11-01
6	Suzhou	3,302,152	4,072,081	10,459,890	JS	2010-11-01
7	Xiamen	3,119,110	3,531,347	3,531,347	FJ	2010-11-01
8	**Hefei**	3,098,727	3,310,268	5,702,466	AH	2010-11-01
9	**Fuzhou**	2,824,414	2,921,762	7,115,369	FJ	2010-11-01
10	Wuxi	2,757,736	3,543,719	6,374,399	JS	2010-11-01
11	Wenzhou	2,686,825	3,039,439	9,122,102	ZJ	2010-11-01
12	Ningbo	2,583,073	3,491,597	7,605,689	ZJ	2010-11-01
13	Zibo	2,261,717	3,129,228	4,530,597	SD	2010-11-01
14	Changzhou	2,257,376	3,290,918	4,592,431	JS	2010-11-01
15	**Nanchang**	2,223,661	2,357,839	5,042,566	JX	2010-11-01
16	Yantai	1,797,861	2,227,733	6,968,202	SD	2010-11-01
17	Xuzhou	1,735,166	1,967,214	8,577,225	JS	2010-11-01
18	Nantong	1,612,385	2,274,113	7,283,622	JS	2010-11-01
19	Huai'an	1,523,655	2,635,406	4,801,662	JS	2010-11-01
20	Linyi	1,522,488	2,303,648	10,039,440	SD	2010-11-01
21	Weifang	1,261,582	2,044,028	9,086,241	SD	2010-11-01
22	Huainan	1,238,488	1,666,826	2,333,896	AH	2010-11-01
23	Taizhou	1,189,276	1,902,510	5,968,838	ZJ	2010-11-01
24	Jinjiang	1,172,827	1,986,447	see Quanzhou	FJ	2010-11-01
25	Quanzhou	1,154,731	1,435,185	8,128,533	FJ	2010-11-01
26	Yancheng	1,136,826	1,615,836	7,262,200	JS	2010-11-01
27	Tai'an	1,123,541	1,735,425	5,494,207	SD	2010-11-01
28	Kunshan	1,118,617	1,644,860	see Suzhou	JS	2010-11-01
29	Wuhu	1,108,087	1,307,042	2,263,123	AH	2010-11-01
30	Putian	1,107,199	1,953,801	2,778,508	FJ	2010-11-01
31	Yangzhou	1,077,531	1,392,563	4,460,066	JS	2010-11-01
32	Cixi	1,059,942	1,462,383	see Ningbo	ZJ	2010-11-01
33	Jiangyin	1,013,670	1,595,138	see Wuxi	JS	2010-11-01

== See also ==
- Yangtze River Delta
