= 2nd Five-Year Plan (China) =

Chinese economic development plan (1958–1962)

China
- 2nd Five-Year Plan
- Start date: 1958
- End date: 1962

Economic targets
- Average GDP growth rate: -0.6%
- Industrial and agricultural growth rate: 11.8%
- GDP at start: CN¥130.821 billion
- GDP at end: CN¥115.124 billion
← 1st	3rd →

2nd Five-Year Plan
- Simplified Chinese: 第二个五年计划
- Traditional Chinese: 第二個五年計劃
Transcriptions
Standard Mandarin
- Hanyu Pinyin: Dìèrgè Wǔnián Jìhuà

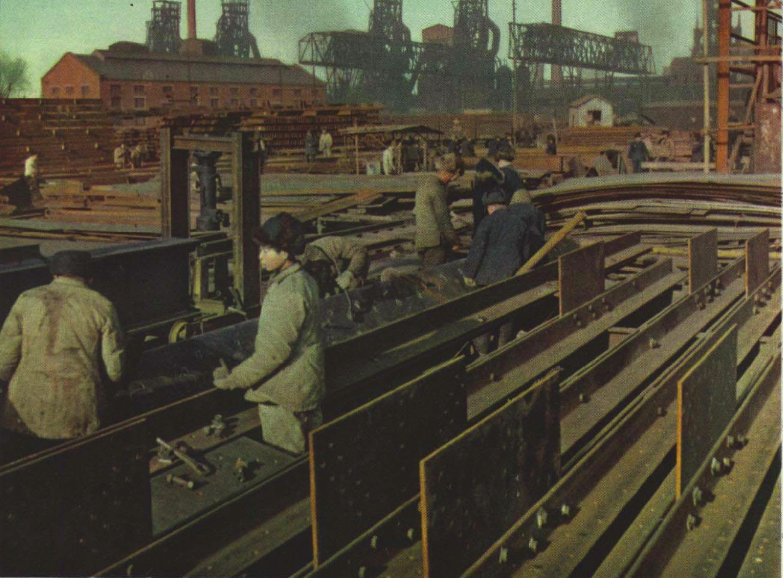
Anshan Iron and Steel Structure Metal Processing Plant in 1952

The 2nd Five-Year Plan was the second five-year plan adopted by the People's Republic of China. It was planned to last from 1958 to 1962, and was more modest than the first Five-Year Plan, but was de facto abandoned since the beginning of the Great Leap Forward.

== Background ==
The first Five-Year Plan made tremendous progress. However, China in 1956 faced a severe rural-urban exodus, a lack of foreign investment and of a technological revolution. By the second half of 1955 and the first half of 1956, Mao Zedong had begun to encourage more radical policies, demanding that people build socialism "more, faster, better, and more economical".

Mao wrote Ten Major Relationships in 1956, calling for a departure from Soviet-style production relations and the investment of more resources in light industry, which was in direct contradiction to the First Five-Year Plan and provoked heated debates. However, his opinion was not heeded in 1956.

== Goals ==
Several moderate goals were set during the 8th National Congress of the Chinese Communist Party, including:

- To continue industrial construction centred on heavy industry.
- To continue our efforts in socialist transformation and to consolidate and extend the system of collective ownership and ownership by the whole people.
- To develop the production of our industry, agriculture and handicrafts, and correspondingly develop our transport and commerce, on the basis of developing capital construction and completing socialist transformation.
- To make energetic efforts to train personnel for construction and strengthen scientific research so as to meet the needs of socialist economic and cultural development.
- To strengthen the national defences and raise the level of material and cultural well-being of the people on the basis of the growth of industrial and agricultural production.

An article by Ma Yinchu published in the People's Daily at the end of 1956, which was endorsed by The National Planning Commission of the People's Republic of China, supported a more balanced development, centering more on light industry than on heavy industry. In addition, the second five-year plan also heralds possible decentralization. The National Planning Commission of the People's Republic of China announced in December 1957 that the targets are 240 million metric tons of grain and 2.15 million metric tons of cotton at the end of the plan. Mao accused the targets of being too low at a meeting the following January, yet this did not substantially influence policy making at the time.

== Desertion ==
With the introduction of the Great Leap Forward slogan in January 1958 and the People's Communalization Movement in the summer, the second Five-Year Plan was virtually ignored, though not abandoned at an official level.

Preceded by 1st Plan; 1953 – 1957	2nd Five-Year Plan; 1958 – 1962	Succeeded by 3rd Plan; 1966 – 1970
