= 6th Five-Year Plan (China) =

Chinese economic development plan (1980–1985)

China
- 6th Five-Year Plan
- Full name: 6th Five-Year Plan for National Economic and Social Development of the People's Republic of China
- Start date: 1980
- End date: 1985

Economic targets
- Average GDP growth rate: 10.3%
- Industrial and agricultural growth rate: 11%
- GDP at start: CN¥454.562 billion
- GDP at end: CN¥901.604 billion
← 5th	7th →

6th Five-Year Plan
- Simplified Chinese: 第六个五年计划
- Traditional Chinese: 第六個五年計劃
Transcriptions
Standard Mandarin
- Hanyu Pinyin: Dìliùgè Wǔnián Jìhuà

6th Five-Year Plan for National Economic and Social Development of the People's Republic of China
- Simplified Chinese: 中华人民共和国国民经济和社会发展第六个五年计划
- Traditional Chinese: 中華人民共和國國民經濟社會發展第六個五年計劃
Transcriptions
Standard Mandarin
- Hanyu Pinyin: Zhōnghuá Rénmín Gònghéguó Guómín Jīngjì hé Shèhuì Fāzhǎn Dìliùgè Wǔnián Jìhuà

The 6th Five-Year Plan, officially the 6th Five-Year Plan for National Economic and Social Development of the People's Republic of China, was a set of economic goals designed to strengthen the Chinese economy between 1981 and 1985.

== Drafting ==
It was first planned as part of the "Ten Year National Economic Development Plan Outline for 1976–1985." (Chinese: 1976—1985年发展国民经济十年规划纲要) In February 1980, the State Council decided to redraft the country's mid- and long-term plans. It convened a seminar to discuss the compilation of the 6th Five-Year Plan. To that end, the State Planning Commission and related departments also carried out extensive research and calculation work on the compilation of the Plan, and organized related experts to conduct scientific appraisals. The 1982 national planning meeting was again mainly focused on the drafting of the Plan. It was only in December that year that the fifth session of the 5th National People's Congress officially ratified the Plan.

== Goals ==
The plan was a more comprehensive plan compared to its predecessors since it adjusted and set national economic development onto a more stable and healthy track, with general objectives to:

- Keep pursuing the principle of "adjust, reform, rectify and improve"
- Further overcome the various challenges to economic development
- Achieve a decisive turn in the fiscal situation
- Lay a solid foundation for the advancement of national economic and social development under the next planning period.

Specific objectives included:

1. To achieve an average annual growth rate of 5% for industrial and agricultural products.
2. To keep the supply and quality of consumer products in line with the growth of social purchasing power and changes in consumption structure, and to keep market prices stable.
3. To vigorously cut down material consumption, particularly that of energy, and keep production in line with the availability of resources.
4. To encourage and implement enterprise technological updating, with energy saving as a priority, and to gather the capital necessary to strengthen the construction of key projects energy and communications in preparation for the 7th Five-Year Plan.
5. To assemble the country's scientific and technological base for scientific and technological research and to promote the application of new technologies, and to strenuously develop education, science and culture to accelerate the construction of an ideological and material civilization.
6. To strengthen the construction of the national defense industry, and enhance national defensive forces.
7. To strengthen production and improve economic efficiency to increase the government's revenue, to gradually increase expenditure on economic and cultural construction and to secure a balance between fiscal revenue and expenditure and credit.
8. To strenuously develop trade, make effective use of foreign capital and actively introduce advanced technology to meet domestic needs.
9. To strictly control the growth of population, make proper employment arrangement for labor forces in the cities and towns, and continuously improve the material and cultural life of people both in cities and the rural areas based on the growth of production and productive efficiency.
10. To strengthen environmental protection efforts.

== Results ==
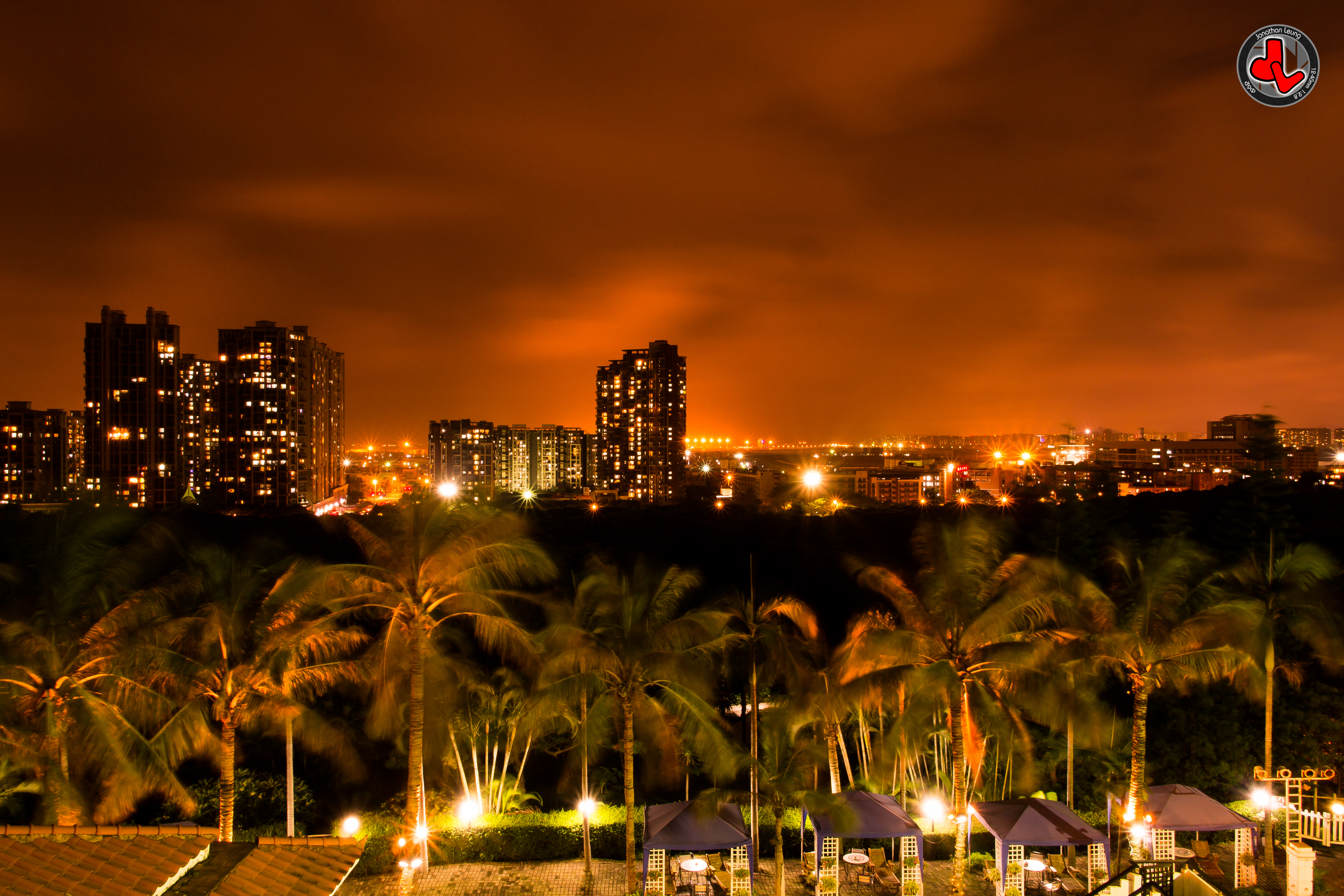
The construction of the Shenzhen Special Economic Zone has started

According to China Daily, the Plan was overall a great success:

- The national economy maintained a stable rate of growth. The average annual growth rate for industrial and agricultural products was 11%. The gross national product in 1985 reached 778 billion yuan ($113 billion), signifying an average annual growth of 10% after inflation since 1980.
- Production volume of key products rose dramatically. Compared with 1980, 1985 saw a growth of 26.1% for steel, 37.1% for coal, 35.8% for electricity, 17.9% for crude oil, 92.8% for cotton and 21.4% for grain.
- Progress was achieved in infrastructure construction and technological updating. Total investment in fixed assets for publicly owned enterprises reached 530 billion yuan. 496 middle and large projects were constructed and started, and another 200,000 projects were transformed and updated.
- The fiscal situation improved gradually year by year. Fiscal revenue grew by an average of 15.9 billion yuan every year, which represented an annual growth of 12% thereby realizing a balance between fiscal revenue and expenditure.
- China's foreign trade transactions and technological exchange entered a new phase. On the world export volume ranking, China rose from No. 28 in 1980 to No .10 in 1984.

Alternatively, several negative results included a disproportionately high fixed asset ratio, rapid growth in consumption and fiscal over-supply. All of this negatively impacted the economy's stability and growth.

The Sixth Five-Year Plan was the first to address government policy support for solar PV panel manufacturing. Policy support for solar panel manufacturing has been a part of every Five-Year Plan since.

Preceded by 5th Plan; 1976 – 1980	6th Five-Year Plan; 1981 – 1985	Succeeded by 7th Plan; 1986 – 1990
