= 4th Five-Year Plan (China) =

Chinese economic development plan (1971–1975)

China
- 4th Five-Year Plan
- Start date: 1971
- End date: 1975

Economic targets
- Average GDP growth rate: 8.2%
- Industrial and agricultural growth rate: 9.1%
- GDP at start: CN¥226.132 billion
- GDP at end: CN¥301.311 billion
← 3rd	5th →

4th Five-Year Plan
- Simplified Chinese: 第四个五年计划
- Traditional Chinese: 第四個五年計劃
Transcriptions
Standard Mandarin
- Hanyu Pinyin: Dìsìgè Wǔnián Jìhuà

The 4th Five-Year Plan was known as the China's national economic development strategy that China formulated from 1971 to 1975. The plan was formally issued in 1971, following the commencement of its preparation in 1970.

== Objectives ==
The primary objectives of this five-year plan were to devote significant attention to the preparation for war, to focus on the construction of the third front, to establish economic cooperation zones at various levels, each with its own unique characteristics, and to vigorously synergize them, and to initially establish China's independent and relatively complete national economic system and industrial system. The plan draft anticipates that the average annual growth rate of industrial and agricultural output value will be 12.5%, the five-year total capital construction investment in the state budget will be 130 billion yuan, the grain output in 1975 will be 600-6500 billion jin, cotton will be 65-70 million quintals, steel will be 35-40 million tons, raw coal will be 400-430 million tons, the power generation capacity will be 200-220 billion kWh, and the railway freight volume will be 9-1 billion tons. In July 1973, the State Planning Commission released a revised draft that reflected the current situation and reduced certain objectives, such as steel production, which was downsized to 30 million tons after two modifications. In the subsequent two years, the national economic situation improved, and all of the main economic indicators met or exceeded the plan in 1973.

In response to these circumstances, the State Council modified the plan requirements once more, directing the following: to effectively compress the scale of infrastructure, streamline the number of employees, and strengthen the overall control of labor wages; to rectify the work of grain consolidation and marketing; to compress the irrational supply; to adjust the proportionality of agriculture, lightness, and weight; and to reduce the high indexes, such as the production of steel, downward. The relationship between national defense construction and economic construction should be adjusted to reduce the costs of national defense construction. Additionally, all types of excessively high economic indicators should be reduced, centralized and unified leadership in economic work should be strengthened, and unified planning and attention to discipline should be emphasized.

== Results ==
The adjustments to a certain extent alleviated the disparity within the national economy. The Fourth Five-Year Plan was officially terminated in January 1975. The final results of the implementation at this time were as follows: the total industrial and agricultural output value completed 101.7% of the plan, with 104.5% of the plan completed in agriculture and 100.6% in industry. The following main products were completed: grain (103.5%), cotton (96.5%), steel (79.7%), raw coal (109.5%), crude oil (110.1%), power generation (103.1%), cotton fibers (96.8%), railroad freight (98.7%), budgeted capital investment (101.6%), and fiscal revenue (98%). This five-year plan also laid the foundation for the reform and opening up.

Preceded by 3rd Plan; 1966 – 1970	4th Five-Year Plan; 1971–1975	Succeeded by 5th Plan; 1976 – 1980
