= 11th Five-Year Plan (China) =

Chinese economic development plan (2006–2010)

China
- 11th Five-Year Plan
- Full name: 11th Five-Year Plan for Economic and Social Development of the People's Republic of China
- Start date: 2006
- End date: 2010

Economic targets
- Average GDP growth rate: 11.1%
- GDP at start: CN¥21.631 trillion
- GDP at end: CN¥40.151 trillion
- The original text of the plan, hosted on Wikisource: 11th Five-Year Plan
← 10th	12th →

11th Five-Year Plan
- Simplified Chinese: 十一五规划
- Traditional Chinese: 十一五規劃
Transcriptions
Standard Mandarin
- Hanyu Pinyin: Shíyīwǔ Guīhuà

11th Five-Year Plan for Economic and Social Development of the People's Republic of China
- Simplified Chinese: 中华人民共和国国民经济和社会发展第十一个五年规划纲要
- Traditional Chinese: 中華人民共和國國民經濟社會發展第十一個五年規劃綱要
Transcriptions
Standard Mandarin
- Hanyu Pinyin: Zhōnghuá Rénmín Gònghéguó Guómín Jīngjì hé Shèhuì Fāzhǎn dì Shíyī gè Wǔ Nián Guīhuà Gāngyào

The 11th Five-Year Plan, officially the 11th Five-Year Plan for Economic and Social Development of the People's Republic of China, was a set of economic goals designed to strengthen the Chinese economy between 2006 and 2010.

The planning philosophy for the 11th Five-Year Plan was significantly shaped by a mid-term evaluation of the 10th Five-Year Plan. The 11th Five-Year Plan introduced a new category of "binding targets" (yueshuxing zhibiao) intended as government promises. These binding targets have since been used especially in non-economic policy areas like environmental protection and land management. Of 22 targets listed in the 11th Five-Year Plan, eight of them were binding targets. These binding targets were incorporated into the criteria for local cadre performance evaluations. The Plan also reflected a change in terminology to the allocation of administrative resourced via "programs" rather than "plans."

== Goals ==
According to draft guidelines submitted to the 2006 National People's Congress session, the goals of the Eleventh Five-Year Guideline were:

Economic growth:

1. GDP up 7.5% annually from 18.2 trillion yuan in 2005 to 26.1 trillion yuan in 2010;
2. Per capita GDP up 6.6% annually from 13,985 yuan in 2005 to 19,270 yuan in 2010.

Economic structure:

1. Share of service industry's value added to GDP up from 40.3% in 2005 to 43.3% in 2010;
2. Share of employment in service industry up from 31.3% to 35.3% in 2010;
3. Share of research and development (R&D) spending out of total GDP up from 1.3% in 2005 to 2% in 2010;
4. Urbanization rate up from 43% in 2005 to 47% in 2010.

Population, resources, environment:

1. Population up from 1.30756 billion in 2005 to 1.36000 billion in 2010;
2. Energy consumption per unit of GDP down 20% in five years;
3. Water consumption per unit of industrial added value down 30% in five years;
4. Coefficient of effective use of water for irrigation up from 0.45% in 2005 to 0.5% in 2010;
5. Rate of comprehensive use of solid industrial waste up from 55.8% in 2005 to 60% in 2010;
6. Total acreage of cultivated land down from 122 million hectares in 2005 to 120 million in 2010;
7. Total discharge of major pollutants down 20% in five years;
8. Forest coverage up from 18.2% in 2005 to 20% in 2010.

Public service, people's life:

1. Term of education per capita up from 8.5 years in 2005 to nine years in 2010;
2. Coverage of urban basic old-age pension up from 174 million people in 2005 to 223 million people in 2010;
3. Coverage of the new rural cooperative medical care system up from 23.5% in 2005 to over 80% in 2010;
4. New jobs created for urban residents reaching 45 million in five years;
5. Number of rural laborers transferred to non-agriculture sectors reaching 45 million in five years;
6. Urban registered unemployment rate up from 4.2% in 2005 to 5% in 2010;
7. Per capita disposable income of urban residents up 5% annually in five years, from 10,493 yuan in 2005 to 13,390 yuan in 2010;
8. Per capita net income of rural residents up 5% annually in five years, from 3,255 yuan in 2005 to 4,150 yuan in 2010.

Beginning with the 11th, each of China's Five Year plans have sought to move China away from energy-intensive manufacturing and into high-value sectors and have highlighted the importance of low-carbon technology as a strategic emerging industry, particularly in the areas of wind and solar power. The plan adopted a more assertive approach to technology transfer in advanced technology. The plan set a national energy intensity target of a 20% reduction. It was identified as a "binding target" and focused on throughout the plan's implementation. Policymakers viewed emissions reductions and energy conservation as the highest priority environmental matters under the 11th Five-Year Plan.

== Results ==
Successful achievement of emissions and energy conservation targets in the 11th Five-Year Plan shaped policymaker's approach for the 12th Five-Year Plan, prompting expanded use of binding targets to capitalize on successes in these areas.

Following the 11th Five-Year Plan, China implemented numerous policies with the goal of encouraging the development of sustainable cities.

Preceded by 10th Plan; 2000 – 2005	11th Five-Year Plan; 2006–2010	Succeeded by 12th Plan; 2011 – 2015
