= 3rd Five-Year Plan (China) =

Chinese economic development plan (1966–1970)

China
- 3rd Five-Year Plan
- Start date: 1965
- End date: 1970

Economic targets
- Average GDP growth rate: 9.0%
- Industrial and agricultural growth rate: 9.6%
- GDP at start: CN¥171.720 billion
- GDP at end: CN¥226.132 billion
← 2nd	4th →

3rd Five-Year Plan
- Simplified Chinese: 第三个五年计划
- Traditional Chinese: 第三個五年計劃
Transcriptions
Standard Mandarin
- Hanyu Pinyin: Dìsāngè Wǔnián Jìhuà

The 3rd Five-Year Plan was a set of economic goals designed to strengthen the Chinese economy between 1966 and 1970. It was the first five-year plan held after the Great Leap Forward, and the plan was implemented around the same time as the Cultural Revolution.

== Background ==
Beginning with the Third Five Year Plan, China framed its socialist economic development in terms of two tasks: (1) establishing an independent and relatively complete national industrial and economic system and (2) modernization of agriculture, industry, national defense, science, and technology.

The Third Plan was originally due early in 1963, but at that time China's economy was too dislocated, as a result of the failure of the Great Leap Forward and four poor harvests to permit any planned operations. Research and study into the elements of this Plan started in early 1964. The Plan contained two comparatively detailed schemes: one was the Preliminary Tentative Plan of the 3rd Five-year Plan (1966–1970) proposed by the State Planning Commission and agreed by the Central Government Work Meeting in May 1964; the other was the Report Syllabus about the Arrangement of the 3rd Five-year Plan drawn out by the State Planning Commission and agreed by the central government in September 1965. As initially conceived, the Third Five Year Plan emphasized further development in China's already more developed coastal areas and a greater focus on consumer goods. It called for enhancing "eating, clothing, and daily use" items (chi, chuan, yong). During discussions of the Third Five Year Plan, Mao acknowledged that during the Great Leap Forward, "We set revenue too high and extended the infrastructure battlefront too long," and that it was "best to do less and well."

== Goals ==
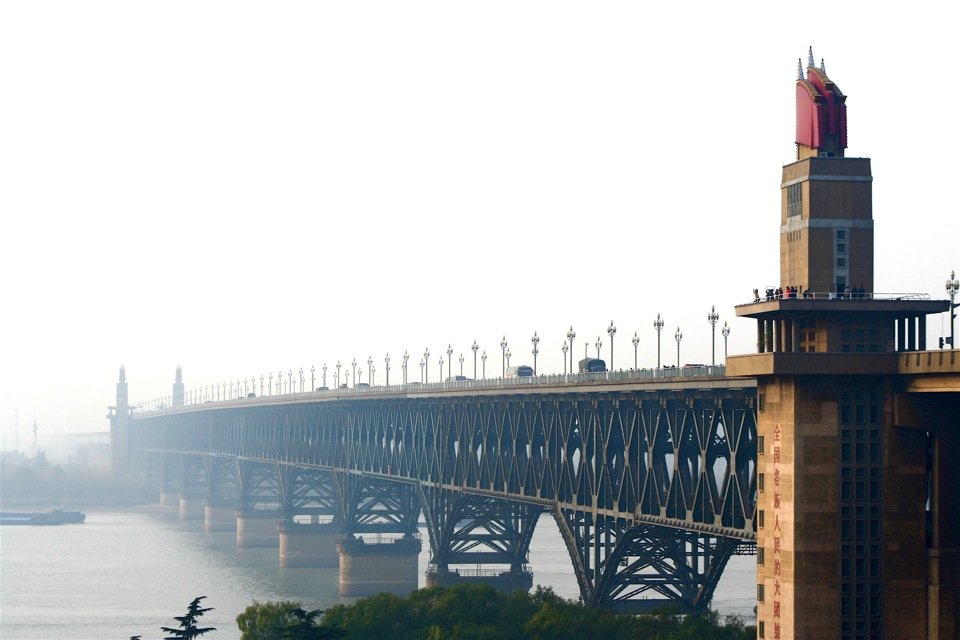
Nanjing Yangtze River Bridge was a core project of 3rd Five-Year Plan

The Tentative Plan set out the following basic tasks:

1. To spare no efforts to develop agriculture, solve widespread problems concerning people's food, clothing and other basic needs;
2. To strengthen national defense, and endeavor to make breakthroughs in technology;
3. In order to support agriculture and strengthen national defense, to enhance infrastructure, continue to improve production quality, increase production variety and quantity, to build an economy of self-reliance, and to develop transportation, commerce, culture, education and scientific research.

The preliminary draft for the Third Five Year Plan, of which Deng Xiaoping was a major author, had no provision for large scale industrialization in the country's interior.

The Plan ultimately called for the prioritization of national defense in the light of a possible big war, actively preparing for conflicts and speeding up construction in three key areas; national defense, science and technology, and industry and transport infrastructure. The turn towards a greater emphasis on developing heavy industries and national defense industries was prompted by the Gulf of Tonkin incident, which increased fears among Chinese leadership that the United States would ultimately invade China. Support among leadership for Mao's proposed Third Front construction increased as a result and changed the direction of the Third Five Year Plan. In 1965, Yu Qiuli was given the lead role in developing the Third Five Year Plan, consistent with its changing focus to preparations for the possibility that "the imperialists [would] launch an aggressive war against China."

== Results ==
The outputs of other newly added major products were 68.06 million tons of coal; 8.60 million kilowatts of electricity; 27.77 million tons of petroleum; 6.53 million tons of steels; 35.90 million tons of iron ore; 2.44 million tons of synthesized ammonia; 2.04 million tons of fertilizers; 15.33 million tons of cement; 187,000 tons of plastics; 3.22 million tons of cotton spindles; 12,300 tons of chemical fibers; 3,894 kilometers of newly constructed railways and 31,223 kilometers of newly constructed highways were put into operation; and handling capacity of the coastal harbors were over 11.91 million tons.

This plan was more successful than anticipated, with the industrial and agricultural goals exceed by 14.1% and industrial gross output value goals by 21.1%. Agricultural gains also exceeded goals, but more moderately, with a 2.2% rise above expectations. According to the Official Portal of the Chinese Government, however, the focus on accumulation and rapid development in this and preceding plans were impediments to long-term economic development.

== Fourth Plan (1971–1975) ==
A first draft of the Plan was developed and agreed upon in September 1970 at the 2nd Plenary Session of the 9th Communist Party Central Committee, which stipulated:

- The average annual growth rate of gross output value of industry and agriculture reach 12.5%.
- 130 billion yuan would be budgeted for infrastructure construction within five years.
- Expected industrial output would reach between 300 and 325 billion kilograms of grain, between 65 and 70 million piculs (3.9–4.2 billion kilograms) of cotton, between 35 and 40 million tons of steel, between 400 and 430 million tons of coal, between 200 and 220 billion kWh of electricity, and between 900 million and 1 billion tons of railway freight.

Preceded by 2nd Plan; 1958 – 1962	3rd Five-Year Plan; 1966–1970	Succeeded by 4th Plan; 1971 – 1975
