= 9th Five-Year Plan (China) =

Chinese economic development plan (1996–2000)

China
- 9th Five-Year Plan
- Full name: 9th Five-Year Plan for National Economic and Social Development of the People's Republic of China and the Long-Range Objectives Through the Year 2010
- Start date: 1996
- End date: 2000

Economic targets
- Average GDP growth rate: 8.6%
- GDP at start: CN¥7.118 trillion
- GDP at end: CN¥9.921 trillion
← 8th	10th →

9th Five-Year Plan
- Simplified Chinese: 第九个五年计划
- Traditional Chinese: 第九個五年計劃
Transcriptions
Standard Mandarin
- Hanyu Pinyin: Dìjiǔgè Wǔnián Jìhuà

9th Five-Year Plan for National Economic and Social Development of the People's Republic of China and the Long-Range Objectives Through the Year 2010
- Simplified Chinese: 中华人民共和国国民经济和社会发展“九五”计划和2010年远景目标
- Traditional Chinese: 中華人民共和國國民經濟社會發展「九五」計畫和2010年遠景目標
Transcriptions
Standard Mandarin
- Hanyu Pinyin: Zhōnghuá Rénmín Gònghéguó Guómín Jīngjì hé Shèhuì Fāzhǎn “Jiǔwǔ” Jìhuà hé 2010 Nián Yuǎnjǐng Mùbiāo

The 9th Five-Year Plan, officially the 9th Five-Year Plan for National Economic and Social Development of the People's Republic of China and the Long-Range Objectives Through the Year 2010, was China's national economic and social development plan for 1996–2000. It was the first complete five-year plan in China since the introduction of the socialist market economy, with the primary objective of enhancing the quality of life and reforming the enterprise system.

== Objectives ==
The Outline of the Ninth Five-Year Plan for National Economic and Social Development and the Long-Term Goals to the Year 2010 were adopted by the Fifth Plenary Session of the 14th Central Committee of the Chinese Communist Party on September 28, 1995. The primary objectives of the Ninth five-year plan for national economic and social development were as follows: to quadruple the per capita GNP in comparison to 1980; to raise the living standards of the populace and reduce poverty; to expedite the establishment of a socialist market economic system and a modern enterprise system; to increase university enrollment; and to increase the number of students in universities and colleges, as well as the number of students in the socialist market economy. promoting a shift from a primitive to an intensive mode of economic development; expanding enrollment in colleges and universities; researching and developing information technology; and implementing a socialist market economic system.

== Accomplishments ==
Factors such as the 1997 Asian financial crisis and the 1998 China floods impeded the progress of the five-year plan. By the year 2000, the Ninth Five-Year Plan had already achieved the majority of its objectives. Additionally, emissions of major pollutants decreased.

== See also ==
- Socialist market economy

Preceded by 8th Plan; 1991 – 1995	9th Five-Year Plan; 1996–2000	Succeeded by 10th Plan; 2001 – 2005
