= 7th Five-Year Plan (China) =

Chinese economic development plan (1986–1990)

China
- 7th Five-Year Plan
- Full name: Five-Year Plan for National Economic and Social Development of the People's Republic of China
- Start date: 1986
- End date: 1990

Economic targets
- Average GDP growth rate: 7.9%
- Industrial and agricultural growth rate: 6.7%
- GDP at start: CN¥1.028 trillion
- GDP at end: CN¥1.867 trillion
← 6th	8th →

7th Five-Year Plan
- Simplified Chinese: 第七个五年计划
- Traditional Chinese: 第七個五年計劃
Transcriptions
Standard Mandarin
- Hanyu Pinyin: Dìqīgè Wǔnián Jìhuà

Five-Year Plan for National Economic and Social Development of the People's Republic of China
- Simplified Chinese: 中华人民共和国国民经济和社会发展第七个五年计划
- Traditional Chinese: 中華人民共和國國民經濟社會發展第七個五年計劃
Transcriptions
Standard Mandarin
- Hanyu Pinyin: Zhōnghuá Rénmín Gònghéguó Guómín Jīngjì hé Shèhuì Fāzhǎn Dìqīgè Wǔnián Jìhuà

The 7th Five-Year Plan, officially the 7th Five-Year Plan for National Economic and Social Development of the People's Republic of China, was a set of economic goals designed to strengthen the Chinese economy between 1986 and 1990.

== Drafting ==
In late September 1985, a conference of Chinese Communist Party (CCP) delegates convened to adopt the "Proposal for the Seventh Five Year Plan" which was set to begin in 1986. The proposal demonstrated a shift from direct government control over enterprises to using indirect macroeconomic controls to "establish a new system for the socialist economy."

In March 1986, the State Council submitted "The 7th Five Year Plan for National Economic and Social Development of the People's Republic of China, 1986–1990" to the Fourth Session of the 6th National People's Congress for review and ratification.

== Goals ==
According to China Daily, the fundamental principles and guidelines of the 7th Five Year Plan were:

1. To put reform at the top of the agenda and coordinate economic development with reform.
2. To maintain a basic balance between overall social demand and supply, between the national budget, credit and materials.
3. To improve economic efficiency, especially that of product quality; to properly handle the relations between efficiency and growth rate, and quality and quantity.
4. To adapt to the changing structure of social demand and the demands of economic modernization, and to further adjust the industrial structure.
5. To regulate fixed asset investments, readjust the investment structure, and speed up the construction of the energy, communications, telecommunications and raw materials industries.
6. To shift the construction focus to the technical updating, reforming and extending of existing enterprises.
7. To further the development of science and education.
8. To further open up to the outside world, combining domestic economic growth with expanding external economic and technologic exchanges.
9. To further improve the material and cultural life of all Chinese people.
10. To strenuously boost the construction of a socialist ideological civilization along with the construction of a material civilization.
11. To carry on in the spirit of arduous struggle, hard work and thrift.

According to China Daily, the specific goals of economic development set out in the Plan were:

- To increase gross national industrial and agricultural output by 38% within five years, or by an average annual rate of 6.7%, gross agricultural output by 4% a year, and gross industrial output by 7.5%.
- To increase gross national output by 44% within five years, or by an average annual rate of 7.5%.
- Production goals for major industrial and agricultural products by 1990 were: between 425 and 450 billion tons for grain, 4.25 million tons for cotton, 550 billion kWh for electricity, 1 billion tons for raw coal, 150 million tons for crude oil, and between 55 and 58 million tons for steel. Freight volume was set at 9.4 billion tons.
- Investment in fixed assets was set at 1,296 billion yuan, with fixed assets projected to grow by 600 billion yuan.
- To increase total import and export volumes by 35% within the five years, while expanding the scale of foreign investment and advanced technology. Further, goals were set to increase the actual consumption of both urban and rural residents by 5% a year, and at the same time keeping the basic balance between the national budget, credit, material and foreign exchange.
- In the field of education, to gradually popularize and implement the nine-year compulsory education scheme, and train five million professionals, twice that during the previous planning period.

As part of efforts at reforming social security, the plan required that responsibility for social security be moved from enterprises to society.

The national goals of the Plan included speeding up development on the coast, with inland regions role's being to "support and accelerate coastal development." During this Plan period, different regions of China were encouraged to develop by leveraging their respective advantages. Coastal regions were instructed to focused on "the restructuring of traditional industries, new industries, and consumer goods production." Western regions were to focus on processing and agriculture. In central regions, energy, construction, and minerals were the focus.

Preceded by 6th Plan; 1981 – 1985	7th Five-Year Plan; 1986–1990	Succeeded by 8th Plan; 1991 – 1995
