= Propaganda Poster Art Centre =

Museum in Shanghai, China

Coordinates: 31.2173452°N 121.4293519°E

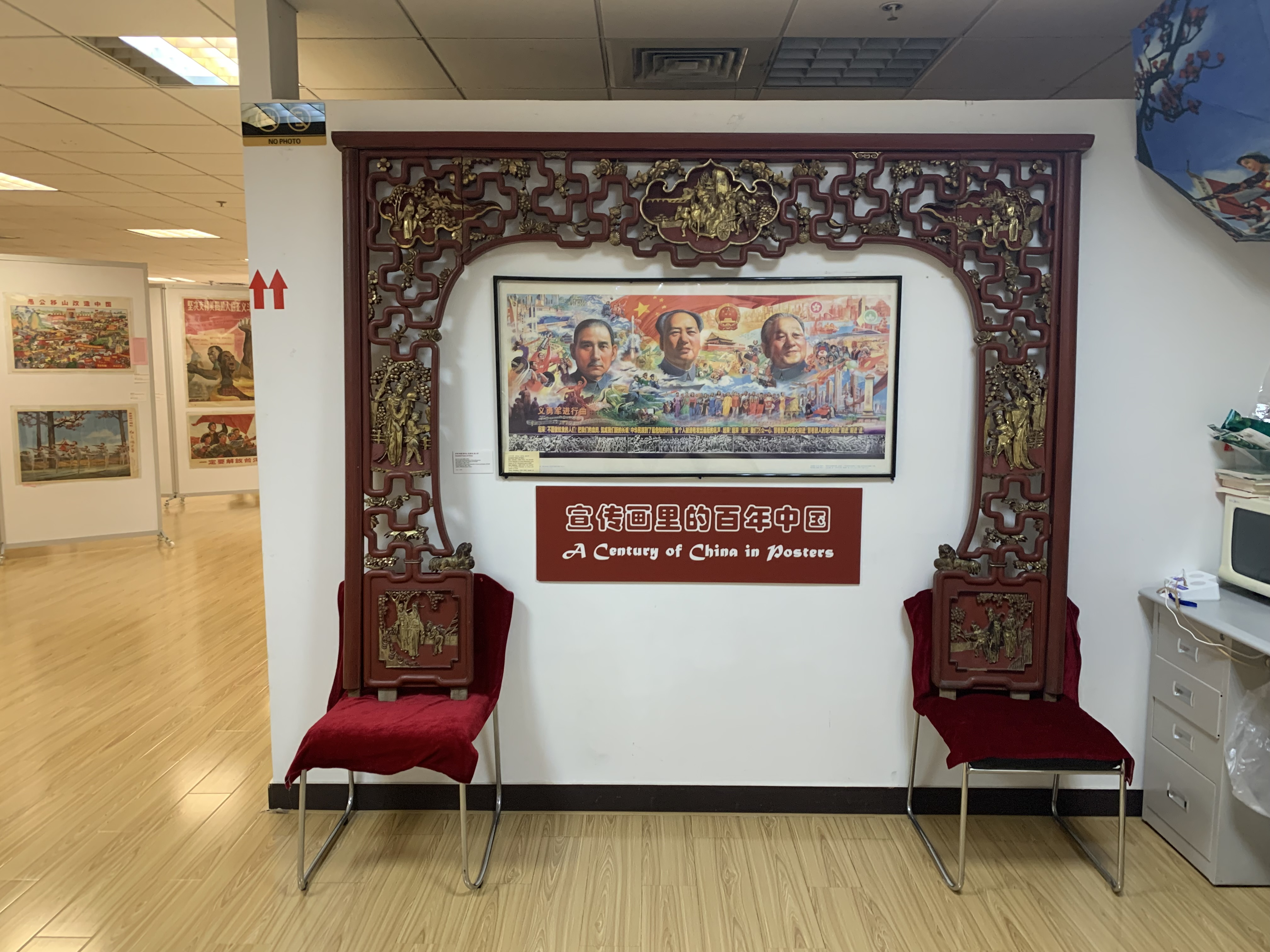
Entrance to the Propaganda Poster Art Centre as of 2024

The Propaganda Poster Art Centre (Chinese: 上海宣传画艺术中心; pinyin: Shànghǎi Xuānchuánhuà Yìshù Zhōngxīn or simplified Chinese: 上海杨培明宣传画收藏艺术馆; traditional Chinese: 上海楊培明宣傳畫收藏藝術舘; pinyin: Shànghǎi Yáng Péi Míng Xuānchuánhuà Shōucáng Yìshù Guǎn) is a museum located in Shanghai which exhibits posters from the Maoist period of communist China, especially from the Cultural Revolution period.

== Location and purpose ==
The museum was located in the basement of an apartment building in Huashan Road facing Wukang Road, in the former French Concession area until 2019 when it relocated to an office building on Yan'an West Road. It has a rich collection of rare last-piece posters.

The owner of the museum, Yang Pei Ming, is keeping the posters as they are to be seen as an art form. He started collecting the posters as a hobby in 1995, and he wants to preserve the posters for the future. The collection is not well known. The museum is visited mainly by tourists, as it is listed in guides such as Lonely Planet, Frommers and also receives referrals from Tripadvisor.
