= 1st Five-Year Plan (China) =

Chinese economic development plan (1953–1957)

China
- 1st Five-Year Plan
- Start date: 1953
- End date: 1957

Economic targets
- Average GDP growth rate: 9.3%
- Industrial and agricultural growth rate: 18%
- GDP at start: CN¥82.419 billion
- GDP at end: CN¥106.929 billion
2nd →

1st Five-Year Plan
- Simplified Chinese: 第一个五年计划
- Traditional Chinese: 第一個五年計劃
Transcriptions
Standard Mandarin
- Hanyu Pinyin: Dìyīgè Wǔnián Jìhuà

The 1st Five-Year Plan was the first five-year plan adopted by the People's Republic of China after its establishment in 1949. It lasted from 1953 until 1957. The plan focused on industrialization and the socialist transformation of the Chinese economy, with technical assistance from the Soviet Union.

== Background ==
Having restored a viable economic base, the leadership under Chairman Mao Zedong, Premier Zhou Enlai, and other revolutionary veterans sought to implement what they termed a socialist transformation of China. The First Five-Year Plan was deeply influenced by Soviet methodologies and assistance from Soviet planners. The PRC government adopted key elements of the Soviet central planning model, including five-year targets for heavy industry, input allocation through planning bureaus, and state-set prices for industrial goods. Soviet advisors, technical manuals, and blueprints were widely used to support implementation. Compared to the Soviet planning method, however, the Plan had less centralized planning with regard to consumer goods and regional planning authorities had greater authority.

== Policies ==
Industrial development was the primary goal. The Plan's highest industrial sector priorities included: power plants, steel, mining, machinery, chemicals, and national defense, centered on steel and coal. To support these priorities, transportation, communication, and mining surveys also received significant state support. With Soviet assistance in the form of both funds and experts, China began to develop industries from scratch. Consistent with the focus on developing industry, northeast China was the region which received the greatest share of state funds during the First Plan.

The First Five-Year Plan phrased its developmental focus in the terminology of revolution. It attributed the backwards state of China's economy to contradictions between the developing productive forces and the capitalist relations of production.

China's state-owned enterprises were generally within the authority of the central government industrial ministries during the First Five-Year Plan period.As state-owned enterprises expanded, the danwei (work unit, 單位) system became more institutionalized. Employment was closely tied to one's workplace, which also provided essential welfare benefits such as housing, healthcare, education, and food rations. This arrangement offered a high degree of stability and was commonly referred to as the iron rice bowl (鐵飯碗). While the system helped maintain urban order, it also allowed the Communist Party to exert direct administrative and ideological control over workers’ daily lives.

Agriculture, fishing, and forestry would be collectivized. Regarding commercial and services industries, the approach in the first Five-Year Plan was for the government to buy them out, including through coercing reluctant sellers if necessary.

The key tasks highlighted in the Plan were:

- Concentrate efforts on the construction of 694 large and medium-sized industrial projects, including 156 with the aid of the Soviet Union
- Lay out the primary foundations for China's socialist industrialization
- Develop agricultural producers’ cooperatives to help in the socialist transformation of the agriculture and handicraft industries
- Put capitalist industry and commerce on the track of state capitalism
- Facilitate the socialist transformation of private industry and commerce.

== Results ==
Accumulated investment in capital construction was 55 billion yuan and fixed asset increments reached 46.05 billion yuan, 1.9 times higher than at the end of 1952. About 595 large and medium-sized projects were completed and put into production, laying the framework of China's industrialization. In addition, investments in capital construction in 1956 totaled 14.735 billion yuan, increasing 70% over the previous year. Fiscal expenditure in the form of infrastructure loans rose to 48% from 30% from 1955, putting a strain on the national budget as a result.

Agriculture, including water conservancy, accounted for only 4% of the government's investment budget. Its gross outputs increased by 24.7% over the plan period.

The gross value of industrial products in 1957 increased 128.6% from 1952. Total production of coal and steel exceeded more than double of the planned growth. Gross output value from industry and agriculture rose from 30% in 1949 to 56.5% in 1957, while that of heavy industry increased from 26.4% to 48.4%. In 1957, grain production reached 195 billion kilograms and cotton output 32.8 million dan (1 dan = 50 kilograms), both surpassing the targets set in the Plan.

Government control over industry was increased during this period by applying financial pressures and inducements to convince owners of private, modern firms to sell them to the state or convert them into joint public-private enterprises under state control. By 1956, approximately 67.5% of all modern industrial enterprises were state owned, and 32.5% were under joint public-private ownership, with no privately owned firms remaining. During the same period, the handicraft industries were organized into cooperatives, which accounted for 91.7% of all handicraft workers by 1956.

The Plan strained agricultural production. Because the Plan set a goal of food self-sufficiency, food imports were restricted. At the same time, the growing industrial labor force and urban population stretched China's technological undeveloped agricultural production. Since traditional family farming practices were not sufficient to support the country's ambitious industrialization projects, CCP officials encouraged families to pool their farms into small cooperatives in order to increase farm yields. Agricultural collectivization in China followed a step-by-step process, starting with mutual aid teams, then moving to producers’ cooperatives, and later to more advanced collectives. Throughout this period, the government organized mass campaigns and public criticism meetings to push the transformation of rural life according to socialist principles.

By the end of 1955 almost 2/3, about 60%, of all Chinese farmers were engaged in cooperative farming. Farming families, who previously engaged largely in subsistence farming, now began raising and selling livestock based on the increase in grain surpluses, which was directly responsible for the practices popularity and rapid rate of enrollment. Central committee planning dictated that from the loosely structured, tiny mutual aid teams, villages were to advance first to lower-stage, agricultural producers' cooperatives, in which families still received some income on the basis of the amount of land they contributed, and eventually to advanced cooperatives, or collectives beginning in 1958 with the second Five Year Plan. In the agricultural producers' cooperatives, income shares were designed to be based only on the amount of labor contributed. In reality, small farming markets that revolved around cooperative surpluses, sprang up across the nation. The land reforms from 1949 to 1951 increased private land ownership, with typical results increasing land ownership of farmers from just under one acre to approximately three acres. The cooperative process, began in 1953, accelerated quickly, slowly from 1955 to 1956. By 1957 about 93.5% of all farm households had joined producers' cooperatives.

In terms of economic growth, the First Five-Year Plan was quite successful, especially in those areas emphasized by the Soviet-style development strategy. During this Plan period, China began developing a heavy-industrial base and brought its industrial production above what it had been prior to war. Thousands of industrial and mining enterprises were constructed, including 156 major facilities. Industrial production increased at an average annual rate of 18.7% between 1953 and 1957, and national income grew at a rate of 9% a year.

Although urbanization had not been a specific goal of the plan's focus on industrialization, industrialization also prompted extensive urban growth. Between 1952 and 1957, China's urban population grew 30%. The creation of new state industrial projects created new factory towns and new industrial districts in older cities. In the early part of the 1950s, city plans also followed the socialist city planning principles from the Soviet 1935 Moscow Master Plan. These principles included maintaining the old city core as administrative areas while building industry on the periphery with green space and residences between the two.

During the First Five-Year Plan period, China raised its agricultural production to above prewar levels. This growth resulted primarily from gains in efficiency brought about by the reorganization and cooperation achieved through cooperative farming. As the First Five-Year Plan had worn on, however, Chinese leaders became increasingly concerned over the relatively sluggish performance of agriculture and the inability of state trading companies to increase significantly the amount of grain procured from rural units for urban consumption, and for funding the many large urban industrialization projects.

By 1956, China had completed its socialist transformation of the domestic economy.

Preceded by Established	1st Five-Year Plan; 1953–1957	Succeeded by 2nd Plan; 1958 – 1962
