= Caribbean poetry =

Poem, rhyme, or lyric that derives from the Caribbean region

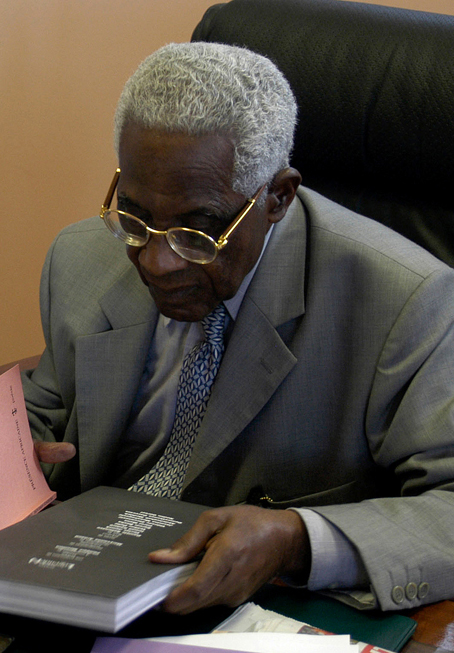
Martinique poet Aimé Césaire in 2003

Caribbean poetry is a vast and rapidly evolving field of poetry written by people from the Caribbean region and the diaspora.

Caribbean poetry generally refers to a myriad of poetic forms, spanning epic, lyrical verse, prose poems, dramatic poetry and oral poetry, composed in Caribbean territories regardless of language. It is most often, however, written in English, Spanish, Spanglish, French, Hindustani, Dutch, or any number of creoles. Poetry in English from the former British West Indies has been referred to as Anglo-Caribbean poetry or West Indian poetry.

Since the mid-1970s, Caribbean poetry has gained increasing visibility with the publication in Britain and North America of several anthologies. Over the decades, the canon has shifted and expanded, drawing both on oral and literary traditions and including more women poets and politically charged works. Caribbean writers, performance poets, newspaper poets, singer-songwriters have created a popular art form, a poetry heard by audiences worldwide. Caribbean oral poetry shares the vigour of the written tradition.

Among the most prominent Caribbean poets whose works are widely studied (and translated into other languages) are: Derek Walcott (who won the 1992 Nobel Prize for Literature), Kamau Brathwaite, Edouard Glissant, Giannina Braschi, Lorna Goodison, Aimé Fernand Césaire, Linton Kwesi Johnson, Kwame Dawes, Claude McKay, and Claudia Rankine.

Common themes include: exile and return to the motherland; the relationship of language to nation; colonialism and postcolonialism; self-determination and liberty; racial identity.

== Caribbean epic poetry ==
Derek Walcott's Omeros (1990) is one of the most renowned epic poems of the 20th century and of the Caribbean. The work is divided into seven books containing sixty-four chapters. Most of the poem is composed in a three-line form that is reminiscent of the terza rima form that Dante used for The Divine Comedy. The work, referencing Homer and other characters from the Iliad, refers to Greek, Roman, and American slavery. The narrative arch of the epic takes place on the island of St. Lucia, where Walcott was born and raised, but includes imaginings of ancient Greece and Rome, as well as travels to modern day Lisbon, London, Dublin, Toronto.

Giannina Braschi's Empire of Dreams (1988) is a postmodern Caribbean epic composed of six books of poetry that blend elements of eclogues, epigrams, lyrics, prose poem, and manifesto. Braschi's United States of Banana (2011) is a geopolitical tragic-comedy about the fall of the American empire, the liberation of Puerto Rico, and the unification of the Caribbean isles. Blending elements of poetry, lyrical essay, and dramatic dialogues, this postmodern epic tackles the subjects of global debt, labour abuse, and environmental crises on the rise.

Anthony Kellman created the Caribbean poetic form Tuk Verse, which incorporates melodic and rhythmic elements of Barbadian indigenous folk music called Tuk. His 2008 book Limestone: An Epic Poem of Barbados is the first published epic poem of Barbados.

In 1977, the government of Jamaica named Claude McKay the national poet and posthumously awarded him the Order of Jamaica for his contribution to literature.

== Caribbean poets by country ==
Grouped by territory of birth or upbringing.

=== Anguilla ===
- Patricia J. Adams
- Bankie Banx
- Rita Celestine-Carty

=== Barbados ===
- Kamau Brathwaite
- Frank Collymore
- George Lamming
- Anthony Kellman
- Paterika Hengreaves (Patricia Hendy)
- Claudia Rankine

=== Cuba ===
- Roberto Fernández Retamar
- Nicolás Guillén
- Lezama Lima
- José Martí
- Nancy Morejon
- Jorge Enrique González Pacheco

=== Dominica ===
- Phyllis Shand Allfrey
- Celia Sorhaindo

=== Dominican Republic ===
- Rafael Nino Féliz
- Blas Jiménez
- Pedro Mir
- Chiqui Vicioso

=== Guyana ===
- John Agard
- Martin Carter
- Mahadai Das
- Mark McWatt
- Grace Nichols

=== Haiti ===
- René Depestre
- Félix Morisseau-Leroy
- Jacques Roumain

=== Jamaica ===
- Louise Bennett
- Jean "Binta" Breeze
- Michelle Cliff
- Kwame Dawes
- Lorna Goodison
- Ishion Hutchinson
- Linton Kwesi Johnson
- Evan Jones
- Ann-Margaret Lim
- Una Marson
- Claude McKay
- Kei Miller
- Mutabaruka
- Oku Onuora
- Jason Allen-Paisant
- Claudia Rankine
- Andrew Salkey
- Olive Senior
- Safiya Sinclair
- Mikey Smith

=== Martinique ===
- Nicole Cage
- Aimé Césaire
- Edouard Glissant

=== Montserrat ===
- Howard Fergus
- E. A. Markham
- Yvonne Weekes

=== Puerto Rico ===
- Julia de Burgos
- Giannina Braschi
- Luis Pales Matos
- Mara Pastor

=== St Lucia ===
- Adrian Augier
- MacDonald Dixon
- George Goddard
- Kendel Hippolyte
- Jane King
- John Robert Lee
- Canisia Lubrin
- Vladimir Lucien
- Derek Walcott

=== St Martin ===
- Fabian Adekunle Badejo
- Charles Borromeo Hodge
- Drisana Deborah Jack
- Laurelle "Yaya" Richards
- Lasana M. Sekou

=== St Vincent and the Grenadines ===
- Cecil Browne
- Shake Keane
- N. C. Marks
- Philip Nanton
- Cecil "Blazer" Williams

=== The Bahamas ===
- Marion Bethel
- Christian Campbell
- Telcine Turner-Rolle
- Nicolette Bethel
- Patricia Glinton-Meicholas

=== Trinidad & Tobago ===
- Lauren K. Alleyne
- Dionne Brand
- Vahni Capildeo
- Anthony Joseph
- John La Rose
- M. NourbeSe Philip
- Roger Robinson

== See also ==
- Caribbean literature
- Dub poetry
- Nation language
- Postcolonial literature
- Cuban literature
- Puerto Rican poetry
