= John Robert Lee (poet) =

Saint Lucian poet (born 1948)

- Born: 1948 (age 77–78); Saint Lucia
- Education: University of the West Indies at Mona
- Occupations: Poet, writer, journalist and librarian
- Awards: Saint Lucia Medal of Merit (Gold)

John Robert Lee (born 1948) is a Saint Lucian Christian poet, writer, journalist and librarian. He has been awarded the Saint Lucia Medal of Merit (Gold) for his contribution to the development of Saint Lucian arts and culture. In 2017, his Collected Poems (1975–2015) were published by Peepal Tree Press.

== Life ==
John Robert Lee was born in Saint Lucia in 1948. The son of an Anglican father and a Catholic mother, he attended Anglican schools and a Catholic church as a child. From 1960 to 1967, he attended Saint Mary's College. Leaving the school after Sixth Form, he worked at the Royal Bank of Canada. During this time he became connected with the St. Lucia Arts Guild, a theatre company established in the years after the Second World War by the Walcott brothers and their friends and dedicated to the exploration of Caribbean identity.

In 1969, he began studying a general arts degree at the University of the West Indies at Cave Hill in Barbados, which included English and French literature, language, history and sociology. Here he met Caribbean artists and became involved in theatre, later forming his own New Day Theatre Workshop in Saint Lucia. He later graduated from the University of the West Indies at Mona in Jamaica with a first-class degree.

In 1974, he returned to Saint Lucia and taught at Saint Mary's College. In 1970, he published his first poems in Link magazine, a Saint Lucian literary journal. In 1975, his first collection of poetry, Vocation, was published by the University of the West Indies' Extra Mural Department In the mid-1970s, he left Saint Mary's College to work as an announcer and producer for Radio St. Lucia and as a cultural officer for Julian Hunte's group of companies.

Lee has said: "I always mark the years 1968 to 1980 as the birth of the new Caribbean. I'm talking about twelve years in which a new Caribbean came." The influence of the new Caribbean culture he engaged with, including music and writers like Kamau Brathwaite and Derek Walcott, have remained with him throughout his life. During this time, he also engaged with Rastafari before leaving for religious reasons and returning to Christianity.

Lee is a professional librarian. In 1979, he joined the Central Library in Saint Lucia and entered the library profession. He has worked at the Castries Central Library and the Hunter J. Francois Library of the Sir Arthur Lewis Community College, Director of Government Information Services and as the information manager at the Folk Research Centre in St Lucia.

He created MAHANAIM publishing, under which imprint he has published several books. He writes an occasional blog entitled MAHANAIM notes.

== Faith ==
As an adult, Lee became a Baptist. He has been an elder and pastor at his church for over forty years, regularly preaching. Speaking on the relationship between his faith and writing, he has said: "I believe all the gifts you have come from our Creator. […] My first book was called Vocation and, if you use a kind of Catholic concept of vocation, you have a calling to serve God in this way. I believe I have a vocation to the writing profession. You know, I have a calling, an aptitude to write. So, I write because I cannot but write." His 2013 collection SIGHTING and other poems of faith (Xlibris, 2013) is a collection of previously published poems, along with some new and unpublished work, dealing with the theme of faith. Lee has said the genesis of the collection was an email from Kamau Brathwaite questioning his religious journey.

He has said that his poems of faith reflect a "sacramental" view, that seek to find and place the "sacred" and "divine" realities within earthly and worldly realities. For him the world around him, street and community life, nature and its seascapes, landscapes, fauna and flora, the culture of the Caribbean and his Saint Lucia become "metaphors of the metaphysical". His poems are not "tracts" but he strives to write good poetry that can stand alongside good poetry of any theme or culture.

== Writing ==
Lee published his first poems in 1970 in Link magazine, a Saint Lucian literary journal. In 1975, he published his first collection of poetry Vocation & other poems (U.W.I. Extra Mural Department, 1975). He has since published many volumes of poetry, including Artefacts: collected poems (Mayers, 2000), Canticles (Mahanaim Publishing, 2007), Elemental: new and selected poems (Peepal Tree Press, 2008) and SIGHTING and other poems of faith (Xlibris, 2013). In 2017, his Collected Poems (1975–2015) were published by Peepal Tree Press, as was his 2020 collection Pierrot.

Lee's poems have been published widely in international anthologies, including The Penguin Book of Caribbean Verse in English (Penguin Classics, 2005), The Oxford Book of Caribbean Verse (Oxford University Press, 2005),The Heinemann Book of Caribbean Poetry (Heinemann, 1992) and World English Poetry (Bengal Publications, 2015). His poems have also appeared in publications such as Small Axe, Poetry Wales, Prairie Schooner, Re-Markings, and The Missing Slate, as well as online journals including The Ekphrastic Review, Interviewing the Caribbean, Small Axe Salon, PREE, and Almost Island.

He has had short stories published in The Faber Book of Contemporary Caribbean Short Stories (Faber & Faber, 1990) and Facing the Sea (Heinemann,1986).

Lee has edited several volumes of St. Lucian poetry and art, including Roseau Valley and Other Poems for Brother George Odlum (Jubilee Trust Fund, 2003), Saint Lucian Literature and Theatre: an anthology of reviews (St. Lucia: Cultural Development Foundation, 2006) with Kendel Hippolyte, Bibliography of St. Lucian Creative Writing (St. Lucia: Cultural Development Foundation, 2013), Sent Lisi: Poems and Art of Saint Lucia (St. Lucia: Cultural Development Foundation, 2014) with Kendel Hippolyte, Jane King, Vladimir Lucien, The Road to Mount Pleasant: selected essays on Saint Lucian culture in honour of Msgr. Patrick Anthony on his 70th birthday [with Embert Charles] (Castries: Folk Research Centre, 2017) and Saint Lucian Writers and Writing: An Author Index (Papillote Press, 2019). He presently curates a Caribbean Poetry Portfolio for Acalabash.com.

Speaking on his attitude to writing, Lee has said: "I use the guidelines of 'truth, beauty and harmony' to shape what I am doing. The words of Michael Mitchell [...] adapting Blake, sum up for me what I aim for: 'grounded in the real world, transformed by metaphor, cultivating empathy, having universal perspective.' I write scrupulously and with attention to detail and accuracy in my fiction and non-fiction (essays, reviews)."

== Bibliography ==
=== Poetry collections ===
- Vocation & other poems (U.W.I. Extra Mural Department, 1975)
- Dread Season (Lithographic Press, 1978)
- The Prodigal (1983)
- Possessions (Lithographic Press, 1984)
- Saint Lucian: Selected Poems, 1967-1987 (Phelps Publishing Company, 1988ISBN 978-0-920298-88-6)
- Clearing Ground: poems (New Life Fellowship, 1991)
- Translations: new and selected poems (1993, ISBN 976-8104-65-1)
- Artefacts: collected poems (Mayers, 2000, ISBN 978-976-8180-01-8)
- Line: for Derek Walcott on his 75th birthday, January 23, 2005. (Photo illustrations by Cecil Fevrier. Castries: The Photoshop, 2005).
- Canticles (Mahanaim Publishing, 2007, ISBN 978-976-8212-07-8)
- Elemental: new and selected poems (Peepal Tree Press, 2008, ISBN 978-1-84523-062-3)
- Sighting and other poems of faith (Xlibris, 2013, ISBN 978-1-4836-1983-5)
- After Gary Butte: Poems (Mahanaim Publishing, 2015)
- City Remembrances (Mahanaim Publishing, 2016)
- Song and Symphony (Mahanaim Publishing, 2016)
- Collected Poems (1975–2015) (Peepal Tree Press, 2017, ISBN 978-1-84523-351-8)
- Pierrot (Peepal Tree Press, 2020, ISBN 978-1-84523-478-2)
- Belmont Portfolio (Peepal Tree Press, 2023)
- After Poems, Psalms (Peepal Tree Press, 2025, ISBN 978-1-84523-600-7)

=== Anthologies (editor/co-editor) ===
- Roseau Valley and Other Poems for Brother George Odlum (Jubilee Trust Fund, 2003, ISBN 978-976-8180-74-2)
- Saint Lucian Literature and Theatre: an anthology of reviews (St. Lucia: Cultural Development Foundation, 2006, ISBN 978-976-95140-1-0, pbk)
- Bibliography of St. Lucian Creative Writing (St. Lucia: Cultural Development Foundation, 2013, ISBN 978-1-4918-1883-1)
- Sent Lisi: Poems and Art of Saint Lucia (St. Lucia: Cultural Development Foundation, 2014, ISBN 978-976-8118-06-6, pbk)
- The Road to Mount Pleasant: selected essays on Saint Lucian culture in honour of Msgr. Patrick Anthony on his 70th birthday. Co-edited with Embert Charles. (Folk Research Centre, 2017, ISBN 978-976-8118-08-0, pbk)
- Saint Lucian Writers and Writing: An Author Index (Papillote Press, 2019, ISBN 978-0-9957263-1-4)

=== Awards and recognition ===
Lee has received the Saint Lucia Medal of Merit (Gold) for his contribution to the development of Saint Lucian arts and culture.

Speaking at the launch of his collection Translations: new and selected poems (1993), fellow Saint Lucian poet and Nobel laureate Derek Walcott praised Lee, saying: "Robert Lee has been a scrupulous poet; that's the biggest virtue he has, and it's not a common virtue in poets, to be scrupulous and modest in the best sense, not to over-extend the range of the truth of his emotions, not to go for the grandiose. He is a Christian poet obviously. You don't get in the poetry anything that is, in sense, preachy or self-advertising in terms of its morality. He is a fine poet."
