= Lasana M. Sekou =

Saint Martin writer and publisher (born 1959)

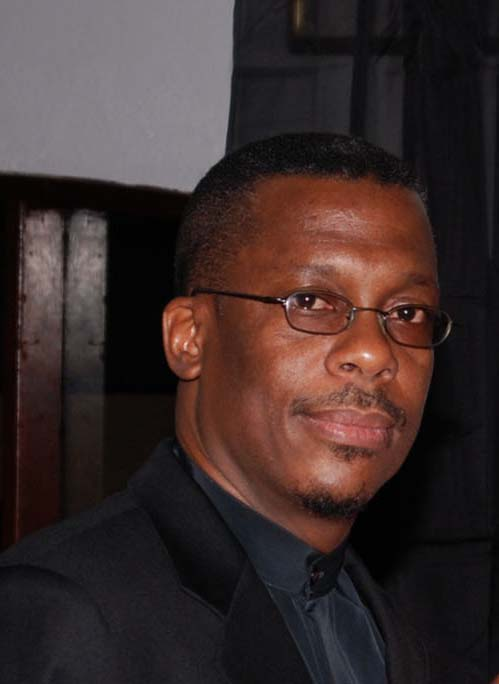
- Sekou at CTO awards ceremony, New York, 2007
- Born: 12 January 1959 (age 67); Aruba
- Education: Howard University; Stony Brook University
- Occupations: Poet, short-story writer, essayist, journalist and publisher
- Known for: Founder of House of Nehesi Publishers (HNP)

Lasana M. Sekou (born 12 January 1959) is a poet, short story writer, essayist, journalist, and publisher from the Caribbean island of Saint Martin.

== Biography ==
Lasana M. Sekou has authored more than 20 books and is considered one of the prolific and multi-layered Caribbean poets of his generation. Dr. Armando Lampe writes that "he's considered the 'Walcott' of the Dutch Caribbean" because of his prolific output, the range of subject matter and unique literary styling, which often includes the use of Caribbean Creole languages, Spanish, French, and Dutch — sometimes in one poem.

Sekou's titles, such as the critically reviewed The Salt Reaper – poems from the flats along with 37 Poems, Nativity, Brotherhood of the Spurs, and Hurricane Protocol have been required reading at Caribbean, South and North American, Italian, and United Kingdom universities. The author is himself a graduate of Howard University (MA, Mass Communication, 1984) and Stony Brook University (BA, Political Science/International Relations, 1982).

Awards and honours include an International Writers Workshop Visiting Fellow (Hong Kong), a James Michener Fellow (University of Miami), a knighthood (The Netherlands), Recognition for literary excellence in the service of Caribbean unity (Dominican Republic), Culture Time Literary Artist of the Decade, the Caribbean Tourism Organization Award of Excellence, and the Sage Cultural Award 2022.

Sekou's poetry and reviews of his works have appeared in Callaloo, The Massachusetts Review, De Gids, Das Gedicht, Prometeo, World Literature Today, Caribbean Quarterly, Postcolonial Text, Jamaica Gleaner, Caribbean Review of Books, Boundary 2, Harriet, and Calabash. His poems have been translated into Spanish, French, Dutch, German, Italian, Turkish, Swedish, and Chinese. Sekou has presented papers and recited his poetry at cultural and literary conferences and festivals in the Caribbean, North and South America, Africa, Europe and Asia. His recitals usually draw large crowds. In St. Martin he is often invited by schools, cultural organizations, and NGOs to recite his poetry and appears regularly on radio and TV discussing cultural, socio-historical, literary, and political issues.

The author's writings are used in high schools and in carnival stage presentations. He is the editor of National Symbols of St. Martin – A Primer and The Independence Papers, Volume 1; and the producer of Fête – The first recording of Traditional St. Martin festive music by Tanny & The Boys. Sekou can be heard reciting his own poetry on The Salt Reaper – Selected poems from the flats (Audio CD, 2009) with music produced by award-winning digital arts designer Angelo Rombley.

Sekou founded House of Nehesi Publishers (HNP) in his dorm room at New York's Stony Brook University in 1980. His second book, For The Mighty Gods... An Offering, with an introduction by Amiri Baraka, was the first book published by HNP in 1982. The indie press has been publishing his work (and others) since that time. He remains active as HNP's projects director since establishing the company in Philipsburg, St. Martin in 1984. At House of Nehesi Publishers Sekou secured the publication of literary luminaries and pioneers such as George Lamming, Kamau Brathwaite, Amiri Baraka, Tishani Doshi, Shake Keane, Chiqui Vicioso, Howard Fergus, Marion Bethel, and the Palestinian author Nidaa Khoury, notable for her concept of post-monotheism. A host of first-time and previously published authors from St. Martin and other territories and countries such as Ian Valz, Charles Borromeo Hodge, Jennie N. Wheatley, Wendy-Ann Diaz, Jay Haviser, Laurelle Yaya Richards, Patricia G. Turnbull, Sara Florian, Yvonne Weekes, and N. C. Marks have also been published by HNP.

In 2003, Sekou was invited to co-found the St. Martin Book Fair by its founder Shujah Reiph, a leading cultural activist and president of the Conscious Lyrics Foundation (CLF). CLF and HNP were the organizing foundations of the St. Martin Book Fair until 2017. Thereafter, Sekou served intermittently as a consultant for the literary festival.

Sekou is an advocate for the independence of St. Martin, which is a colony of France and the Netherlands. In the 1994 and 2000 consultative constitutional status referendums that were held in the Southern or Dutch part of St. Martin, Sekou was a leading organizer and speaker for the Independence option as a member of the Independence for St. Martin Foundation, of which his brother and political scientist Joseph H. Lake, Jr., was the founding president.

== Works ==
=== Drama ===
- Nativity & Monologues For Today (1988)
- The Casino Man: monologues (2025)

=== Fiction ===
- Love Songs Make You Cry (1989)
- Brotherhood of the Spurs (1997, 2007)
- Love Songs Make You Cry – Second Edition (2014)
- Fraternidad de las espuelas (2018)

=== Poetry collections ===
- Moods for Isis – Picturepoems of Love & Struggle (1978)
- For the Mighty Gods … An Offering (1982)
- Images in the Yard (1983)
- Maroon Lives … For Grenadian Freedom Fighters (1983)
- Born Here (House of Nehesi, 1986)
- Nativity & Monologues For Today (1988)
- Mothernation – Poems from 1984 to 1987 (1991)
- Quimbé … The Poetics of Sound (1991)
- The Salt Reaper – Poems from the flats (2004, 2005)
- 37 Poems (2005)
- Nativity / Nativité / Natividad – Trilingual Edition (2010)
- Corazón de pelícano – Antología poética de Lasana M. Sekou/Pelican Heart – An Anthology of Poems by Lasana M. Sekou Edited by Emilio Jorge Rodríguez (2010)
- Musa desnuda – Selección, introducción y notas Emilio Jorge Rodríguez (2011)
- Maroon Lives Tribute to Maurice Bishop & Grenadian Freedom Fighters. Revolution As Poetic Inspiration: Grenada in Maroon Lives (2013). Poetry collection by Lasana M. Sekou; with literary essay by Fabian Adekunle Badejo
- Book of The Dead (2016)
- Hurricane Protocol (2019)
- 37 Poems (2020) Second Edition. eBook.
- 6 Poems by Lasana M. Sekou | 6 Poèmes de Lasana M. Sekou | 6 Poemas de Lasana M. Sekou (2022)

=== Pamphlet ===
- Big Up St. Martin – Essay & Poem (1999)

=== Discography ===
- The Salt Reaper – selected poems from the flats. Mountain Dove Records, 2009.

=== Producer ===
- Tanny & The Boys. Fête – The First Recording of Traditional St. Martin Festive Music. Mountain Dove Records, 1992, 2007.

=== Edited publications ===
- The Independence Papers – Readings on a New Political Status for St. Maarten/St. Martin, Volume 1 (1990)
- Fête – Celebrating St. Martin Traditional Festive Music (1992, 2007)
- National Symbols of St. Martin – A Primer (1996, 1997)
- Chester York – Making of A Panman (1999)
- Gassy – Champion Cyclist (1999
- St. Martin Massive! A Snapshot of Popular Artists (2000)
- Where I See The Sun: Contemporary Poetry in St. Martin (2013)
- Where I See The Sun: Contemporary Poetry in Anguilla (2015)
- Where I See The Sun: Contemporary Poetry in the Virgin Islands (2016)
- Where I See The Sun: Contemporary Poetry in The Bahamas (2026), (Edited with Marion Bethel)

== Critical writing about Sekou ==
- Fergus, Howard A., Love Labor Liberation in Lasana Sekou. House of Nehesi Publishers, 2007.
- Florian, Sara, PhD, Caribbean Counterpoint: The Aesthetics of Salt in Lasana Sekou. House of Nehesi Publishers, 2019.
- Kuwabong, Dannabang, Rhetoric of Resistance, Labor of Love: The Ecopoetics of Nationhood in the Poetry and Prose of Lasana M. Sekou. House of Nehesi Publishers, 2025.
- Rodríguez, Jorge Rodríguez (editor), Pelican Heart / Corazón de Pelícano – An Anthology of Poems by Lasana M. Sekou / Antología poética de Lasana M. Sekou. Selección, introducción y notas / Selection with Introduction and Notes by Emilio Jorge Rodríguez. House of Nehesi Publishers, 2010.
