= Maya C. S. =

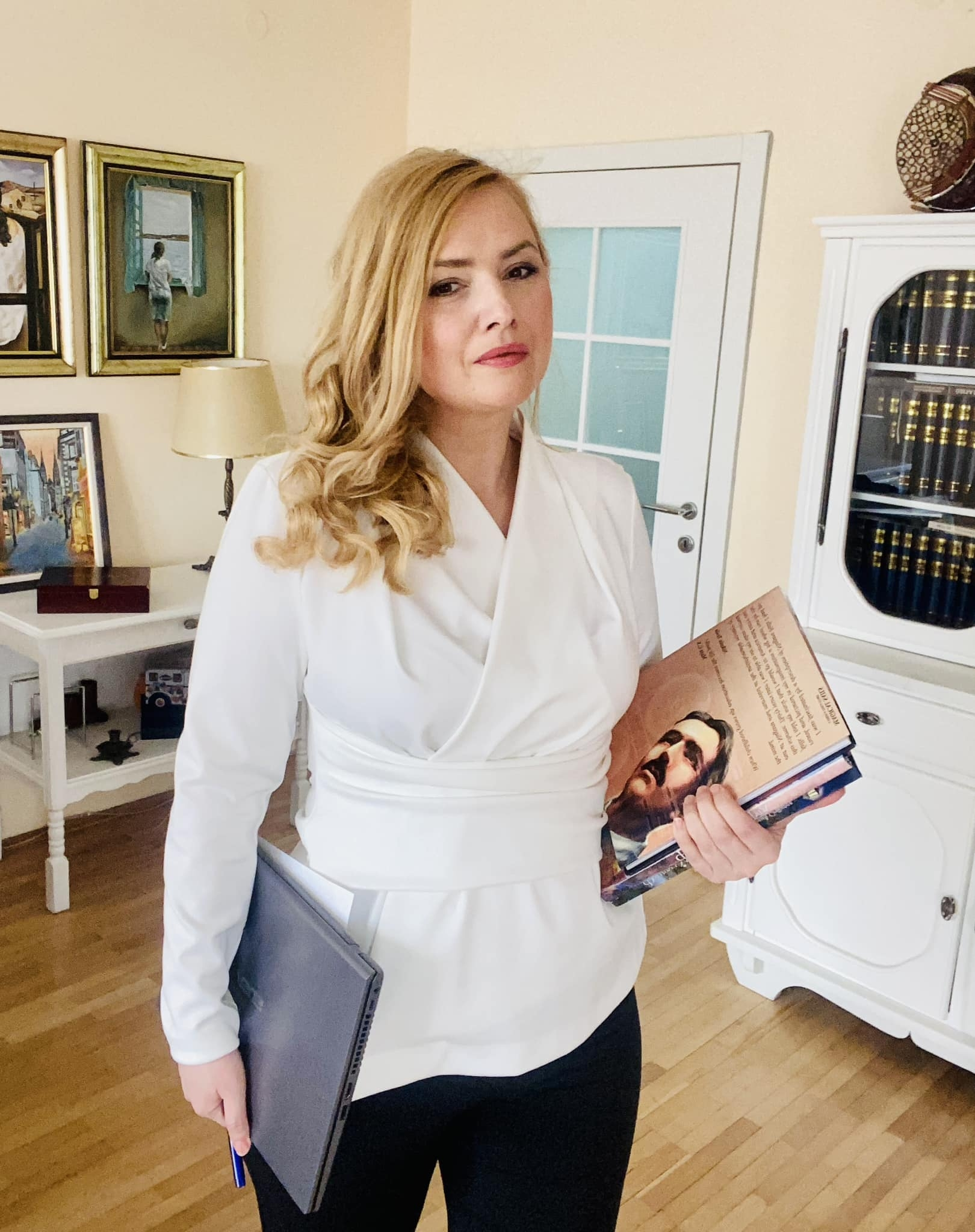
- Born: 27 April 1980 (age 46); Pirot, PR Serbia, FPR Yugoslavia
- Occupations: Poet, writer
- Writing career
- Period: 2017–present
- Genre: literature for children

Maja Cvetković Sotirov (born April 27, 1980) is a Serbian writer for children and young adults. Her book, "Magical Sails – A Nikola Tesla Story" was translated into English by Jelena Vitezović, and originally titled: “Čarobni jedrenjak – Priča o Nikoli Tesli”.

Maja is a member of the Association of Writers of Serbia, Institute of Children's Literature in Belgrade, and Tesla Science Foundation Serbia.

== Biography ==
Maja Cvetković Sotirov finished the Lyceum (natural sciences and mathematics) in her hometown before receiving her master's degree at the department for Serbian language and literature at the University of Philosophy in Niš.

She writes both prose and poetry, often including fairy-tale elements. Maja's prose works are included in reading diaries within the literary project "Čitalići".

== Bibliography ==
=== Literary works ===
- Čarobni jedrenjak – Priča o Nikoli Tesli (Magical Sails – A Nikola Tesla Story), Institut za dečju književnost, Luka books, 2021. ISBN 978-86-81814-05-5
- Francuska avantura (Priča o Blezu Paskalu) (The French Adventure – A Blaise Pascal Story), Luka books, 2017/2018.ISBN 978-86-81814-01-7
- Dečak koji nije želeo da posadi drvo (The Boy Who Didn't Want to Plant a Tree), Luka books, 2020. ISBN 978-86-81814-00-0
- Dečak i vila (The Boy and the Fairy), Luka books, Pirot, 2020. ISBN 978-86-81814-02-4
- Noć uoči Božića sa Teslom (The Night Before Christmas with Tesla), 2022. (poetry, in both Serbian and English)
- Ogledalo (Mirror), 2023.
- Magical Sails – A Nikola Tesla Story, New York: Austin Macauley Publishers, 2024. (English) ISBN 979-8-8891051-9-0

=== E-stories ===
- Mačak koji nije želeo da pere ruke (The Cat that Didn't Want to Wash its Paws)
- Sneguročka i srce od pahulje (Snow White and the Snowflake Heart)
- Devojčica koja je upoznala Pinokija (The Girl who Met Pinocchio)
- Vila i kofer (The Fairy and the Suitcase)

=== Magical Sails – A Nikola Tesla Story ===
“Magical Sails – A Nikola Tesla Storyˮ ("Čarobni jedrenjak – Priča o Nikoli Tesliˮ) is a childrenʼs novel first published in Serbia in 2021 by the Institute for Childrenʼs Literature and Luka Books. The book is intended for children aged 10 to 12 and represents a blend of science fiction and historical facts from the life of Nikola Tesla.

The story follows two children, Luka and Lana, who travel through time with the help of a guardian-fairy named Angelina and a fairy-robot named Viloid. Their mission is to protect Tesla's childhood and inventions from the villainous fairy Gromlina. Along the way, they visit important locations in Tesla's life, including Smiljan, Paris, New York, Chicago, and Niagara Falls. The narrative explores themes such as good and evil, forgiveness, and perseverance.

The book is illustrated by V. Mančić. The third edition in Serbian was published in 2023. The English version of the book, translated by Jelena Vitezović was published in the United States (New York) in 2024, entitled "Magical Sails – A Nikola Tesla Storyˮ.

For her contribution in promoting Tesla's biography to children, the Sotirov received the Tesla Spirit Award, awarded by the Tesla Science Foundation in New York, in 2023.

== Awards and recognitions ==
- Best children's book in Montenegro – Francuska avantura, 2020/2021.
- "Lukijan Mušicki" Award – Dečak i vila, 2021.
- Tesla Spirit Award for the best children's book on Nikola Tesla published worldwide in 2023
- Nominated for the "Little Prince" Award (Festival "Vezeni most", Tuzla)
- Recognition by the Literary Workshop Kordun and Literary Guild for her contribution to the development of children's literature and Serbian children's literature in the world, 2024.

== Sources ==
- Danica V. Stolić, „Dva hronotopa u bajkovitoj prozi Maje Cvetković Sotirov" (2021), Književnost za decu i mlade na razmeđi dva milenijuma (Zbornik radova sa međunarodnog naučnog skupa), str. 23, Beograd–Paraćin, 2021. ISBN 978-86-85111-48-8
- Jelena P. Veljković Mekić, „Maja Cvetković Sotirov", Godišnjak Instituta za dečju književnost (2021), Godišnjak Instituta za dečju književnost, br. 1, str. 121, Beograd, 2021. ISSN 2812-765X
- Dr Milutin Đuričković, „Bajkovita proza za decu Maje Cvetković Sotirov i Željane Radojičić Lukić" (2022), Bajka u XXI stoljeću – Izazovi novog vremena, knjiga 1, str. 29, Sarajevo, 2022. ISBN 978-9926-8322-5-4
- Gordana Jež Lazić, Tekst o knjizi Čarobni jedrenjak – Priča o Nikoli Tesli, Zavod za unapređenje obrazovanja i vaspitanja Srbije (2023)
- „Korifeji studija nacionalne filologije XIX: Maja Cvetković Sotirovˮ, blog Filološkog fakulteta u Nišu (2024)
