= Post-monotheism =

Theosophical concept

In the philosophy of religion and theology, post-monotheism (from Greek μόνος "one" and θεός "god," with the Latin prefix "post-" as in "after" or "beyond") is a term covering a range of different meanings that nonetheless share concern for the status of faith and religious experience in the modern or post-modern era. There is no one originator for the term. Rather, it has independently appeared in the writings of several intellectuals on the Internet and in print.

Its most notable use has been in the poetry of Arab Israeli author Nidaa Khoury.

== Martin Heidegger ==
The Dutch philosopher Herman Philipse, author of The Atheist Manifesto (Atheistisch manifest & De onredelijkheid van religie) (2004), uses the term "post-monotheism" to describe Martin Heidegger's position vis-a-vis traditional Christianity as a "failing tradition" obscuring an "original revelation of being." In Philipse's formulation, "post-monotheism" signifies "the attempt to replace the Christian religion by a different variety of religious discourse, the meaning of which is parasitic upon the monotheist Christian discourse that it intends to destroy."

== D. H. Lawrence and Shinobu Orikuchi ==
Hiroaki Inami, a blogger and professor of philosophy at the University of Tokyo, uses the term "post-monotheism" to describe the religious viewpoints of the writers D. H. Lawrence and Shinobu Orikuchi. Inami interprets Lawrence’s The Escaped Cock (1929) and Orikuchi’s The Book of the Dead (1997) as presenting "a vision and a possibility of a new universal religion, which is, in a sense, a fusion of polytheism and monotheism. But from the viewpoint of a theory of discrete difference, their new religions are post-polytheism and post-monotheism and can be called new polytheism (or super-polytheism)."

== Christopher Schwartz ==
In Christopher Schwartz's formulation, "post-monotheism" is the belief in the existence of one deity, or in the oneness of God, coupled with the belief in the failure (or inability) of existing theological categories in Christianity and Islam to accurately describe divine nature. According to Schwartz, the paucity of theological language is most evident during human suffering and should thus be considered a major barrier for religious experience.

Schwartz's concept of post-monotheism opposes the "post-theism" formulated by Frank Hugh Foster and the notion "God is dead" from Heidegger and Friedrich Nietzsche. It has similarities to the "transtheistic" ideas of Paul Tillich and Heinrich Zimmer, as well as possibly open theism. However, its program is decidedly different from the existentialism of the former and the evangelism of the latter. Rather, it appears to be an application to traditional theodicy of pragmatist and post-modernist philosophy, as well as cognitive psychology and transhumanist futurology. In particular, Schwartz's post-monotheism appears to have its roots in Richard Rorty's Contingency, Irony, and Solidarity (1989), and has avowedly mystical aspirations.

Schwartz uses the phrase in the essay, "The Historian's Theodicy". In this essay he explores several problems of religious experience and the study of religion, e.g., "None of us can know with certainty that atheists and nontheists aren’t experiencing God — or that we monotheists are." From the deconstruction of traditional theodicy and hierology he derives eight "axioms":

- History defies the absolutisms of moral theory.
- History itself, as the theater of revelation, threatens the reliability of prophecy.
- History challenges the very possibility of exegesis and theosophy.
- History, both personal and of the species, challenges the very possibility of hierology.
- Patterns notwithstanding, history teaches that there is no necessity (necessity is not necessary).
- History creates its own ethical imperatives, and action requires only faith rather than certainty.
- The future threatens the reliability of history.
- History itself, though it is the theater of revelation, is insufficient to account for or against divine concern and action.

Fundamental to this brand of post-monotheism is the author's assertion, "God is an enigma and power beyond the human yet is accessible [...] Spiritual experience flies in the face of historical experience: whatever 'God' is, it is concerned for us — and it is reaching out to us."

A central motif of Schwartz's post-monotheism is the analogy of God as a playwright or "storywriter," in essence the opposite of both the deist watchmaker analogy and what Schwartz describes as "ultra-transcendent, legalistic, and cruel visages" of religious fundamentalism. According to the "storywriter" analogy, God and the Creation are "in partnership." Schwartz gives the example of William Shakespeare's fictional character Hamlet, arguing that the character's dying words are metafictional and thus fitting for what he believes to be the actual nature of humanity's relation to the Godhead.

== See also ==
- Abrahamic religions
- Apostasy
- Christian theology
- God is dead
- Ineffability
- Islamic theology
- Nontheism
- Open theism
- Post-theism
- Problem of evil
- Religion
- Theism
- Theodicy
- Transtheism
