= Barabajan Poems =

Brathwaite's postcolonial writings

- Author: Kamau Brathwaite
- Subject: Barbadian poetry History and criticism, Postcolonialism
- Genre: Criticism, interpretation, etc
- Set in: The Caribbean
- Published: 1994
- Publisher: Savacou Publications
- Publication place: Jamaica and United States
- Media type: Print
- Pages: 380+
- ISBN: 9780964042438
- OCLC: 31099127

Barabajan Poems, 1492–1992 is a collection of various types of writing, authored by the Barbados postcolonial author Kamau Brathwaite and published by Savacou Publications in 1994.

In this collection, readers experience a number of Brathwaite's overwhelming ordeals in his recent life, shared honestly and sincerely. It is not only autobiographical but also represents a community defined by a Caribbean culture in transition from colonialism to a modernized independent economic state within the "new world order". It is fictionally and spiritually a magic book, serving as a counterweight to Prospero's books of magic in Shakespeare's playThe Tempest, and is a foil for the bygone landlords Christopher Columbus (1992 was the Columbus Quincentenary) and the fictional Prospero.

== Sycorax the muse ==
In an attempt to give voice to unspoken indigenous cultures, Brathwaite's postcolonial poems outline the history of the Caribbean through Sycorax's eyes. Sycorax is presented as Brathwaite's muse, possessing him and his computer to give full voice to the history of the silenced, who in Brathwaite's philosophy are not only Caribbean natives, but any culture under-represented during the colonial period.

According to Brathwaite, "[W]hat happened to Caliban in The Tempest was that his alliances were laughable, his alliances were fatal, his alliances were ridiculous. He chose the wrong people to make God." Brathwaite "considered Sycorax, Caliban's mother, 'a paradigm for all women of the Third World, who have not yet, despite all the effort, reached that trigger of visibility which is necessary for a whole society.'"

== See also ==
- Literature of the Caribbean
- Culture of the Caribbean
