= Sycorax =

Character in Shakespeare's The Tempest

- The Tempest character
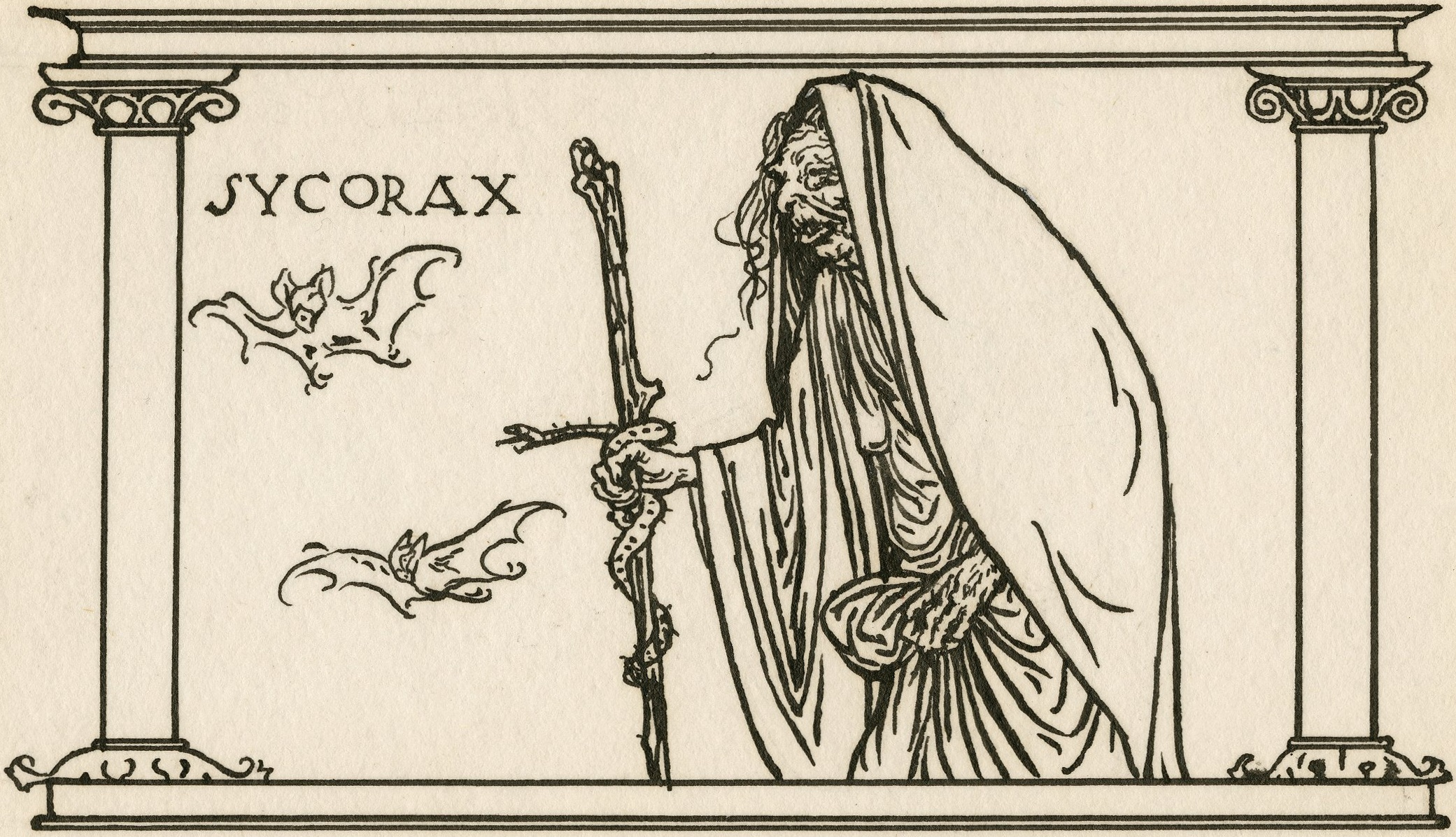
- A drawing of Sycorax by Robert Anning Bell.
- Created by: William Shakespeare

In-universe information
- Family: Caliban (son)

Sycorax /ˈsɪkəræks/ is an unseen character in William Shakespeare's play The Tempest (1611). She is a vicious and powerful witch and the mother of Caliban, one of the few native inhabitants of the island on which Prospero, the hero of the play, is stranded.

According to the history provided by the play, Sycorax, while pregnant with Caliban, was banished from her home in Algiers to the island on which the play takes place. Memories of Sycorax, who dies several years before the main action of the play begins, define several of the relationships in the play. Relying on his filial connection to Sycorax, Caliban claims ownership of the island. Prospero constantly reminds Ariel of Sycorax's cruel treatment to maintain the sprite's service.

Scholars generally agree that Sycorax, a foil for Prospero, is closely related to the Medea of Ovid's Metamorphoses. Postcolonialist writers and critics see Sycorax as giving voice to peoples, particularly women, recovering from the effects of colonisation. Later versions of The Tempest, beginning with William Davenant's seventeenth-century adaptation, have given Sycorax a vocal role in the play, but maintained her image as a malevolent antagonist to Prospero.

== Role in the play ==
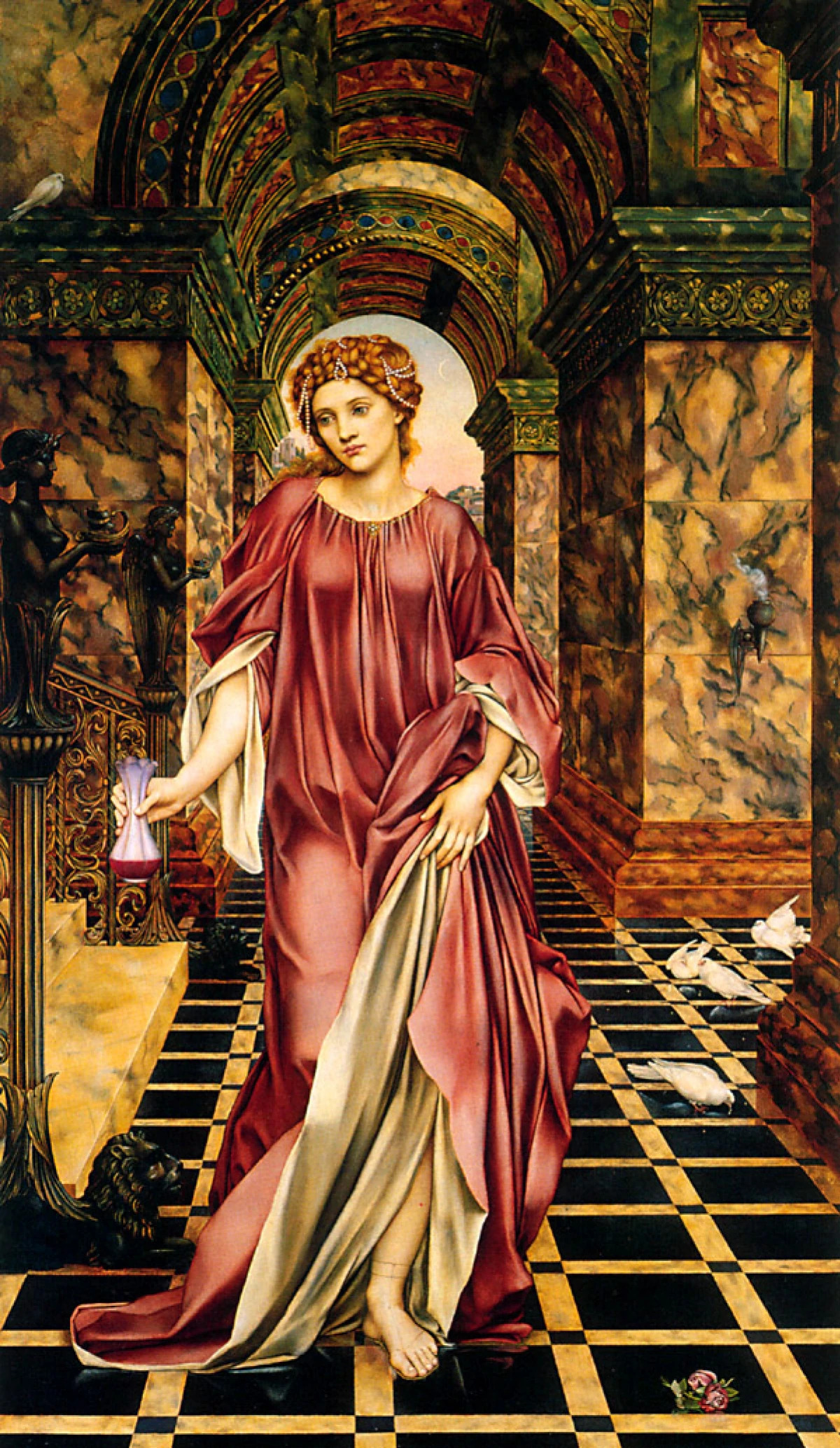
Medea (1889) by Evelyn De Morgan; Scholars see parallels between Ovid's Medea and Shakespeare's Sycorax.

In The Tempest, Prospero describes Sycorax as an ancient and foul witch native to Algiers, and banished to the island for practising sorcery "so strong / That [she] could control the Moon". Prospero further relates that many years earlier, sailors had brought her to the island, while she was pregnant with her son, Caliban, and abandoned her there, as, due to her pregnancy, she was spared being put to death. She proceeded to enslave the spirits there, chief among them Ariel, whom she eventually imprisoned in a pine tree for disobedience. Sycorax birthed Caliban and taught him to worship the demonic god Setebos. She dies long before the arrival of Prospero and his daughter, Miranda. Caliban grows to hate Prospero's presence and power on the island, claiming that the land belongs to him since it was his mother's before Prospero appeared.

== Sources ==
Scholars have unearthed very few facts about Shakespeare's sources for Sycorax. In fact, other than her connection to the magical sorceresses Medea and Circe of Greek mythology, nothing conclusive has been proposed.

Several competing linguistic theories have been put forth. Some scholars argue that her name may be a combination of the Greek sys ("sow") and corax ("crow" or "raven"). Another rough translation produces the phrase "the Scythian raven", an etymological description of Medea (Batman upon Bartholome, a work which Shakespeare is likely to have used for reference, gives the name Corax for a raven) Also, psychorrhax ("heartbreaker"), may be a play on the Greek word psychoraggia ("death struggle"). Another possibility is the Arabic transliteration shokoreth for "deceiver". Another recent idea suggests that, for thematic as well as historical reasons, the name is the reverberant combination of syllables in the name Corax of Syracuse, the often acknowledged founder of rhetoric, and the worthy, fictionalised rival of Prospero. An especially odd and early guess at a meaning by one critic was sic or rex, a Latin homophone alluding to Queen Elizabeth's pride.

The general idea for Sycorax's character may have come from the classical literature familiar to many in Shakespeare's day. Sycorax is similar to Medea, a witch in Ovid's Metamorphoses, in that both are powerful, magical female figures. Scholars have also pointed out that Sycorax resembles the magical Circe from Greek mythology as well as perhaps a version of Circe found in the mythology of the Coraxi tribe in modern-day Georgia.

Sycorax also draws on contemporary beliefs regarding witches. For example, she may embody the belief that all witches have blue eyes. The character may even be a reference to a specific historical personage. According to Romantic literary critic Charles Lamb, a witch, whose name has been lost to history, had been banished from North Africa about half a century before the time Shakespeare was writing the play; her similarity to Sycorax has struck a few scholars as notable. Lamb's claims, however, remain unverified.

== Analysis ==
=== Silent Sycorax ===
"[Sycorax is] a paradigm for all women of the Third World, who have not yet, despite all the effort, reached that trigger of visibility which is necessary for a whole society" - Kamau Braithwaite.

Sycorax's silent role plays an important part in postcolonial interpretations of The Tempest. Because she is native to Algiers and her story is only heard through others (Prospero, Ariel, and Caliban), she is championed by some scholars as a representation of the silenced African woman. Postcolonial authors have also claimed her; for example, Kamau Brathwaite, in his 1994 work Barabajan Poems, includes "Sycorax's book" as a counterpart to "Prospero's book" (mentioned in Act 5 of Shakespeare's play). In an attempt to give voice to unspoken indigenous cultures, Brathwaite's poems outline the history of the Caribbean through Sycorax's eyes. Sycorax is presented as Brathwaite's muse, possessing him and his computer to give full voice to the history of the silenced, who in Brathwaite's philosophy are not only Caribbean natives, but any culture under-represented during the colonial period.

Other postcolonial scholars have argued that Shakespeare's audiences would have connected Sycorax with the threat of Islamic expansionism. Islam had successfully conquered and colonised much of the Middle East and some of southern Europe during the Middle Ages. The Algerian Sycorax may represent Christian Europe's fear of Islam and its growing political power. This interpretation inverts the traditional postcolonial interpretations of The Tempest, however. If Sycorax is viewed as an Islamic expansionist, then she herself is the coloniser, not Prospero (who becomes merely a re-coloniser of the island). However, Sycorax's portrayal as an absent, silent woman still allows the play to solidify the idea of European over Islamic power.

Interpretations of Sycorax as silenced focus not only on her race but her gender as well. Most of what is said about her in the play is said by Prospero. However, as scholars point out, Prospero has never met Sycorax—all he learned about her he learned from Ariel—and his suspicion of women makes him an unreliable source of information. Skeptical of female virtue in general, he refuses to accept Caliban's prior claim to the island, accusing him of being a bastard "got by the devil himself / Upon thy wicked dam."

=== Sycorax and Prospero ===
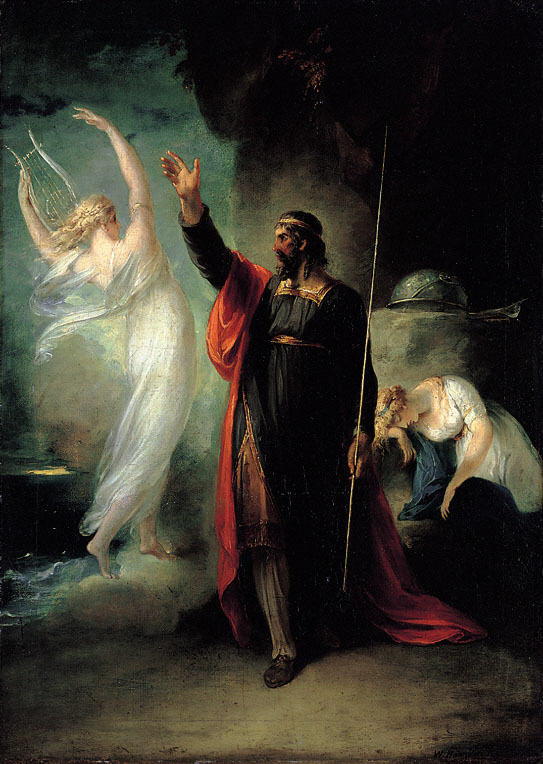
Prospero's methods of control are very similar to Sycorax's, making the supposed opposition between them less distinct.

In The Tempest, Shakespeare presents two powerful sorcerers, Prospero and Sycorax, who have both controlled the island. Initially it appears that the two characters are a contrasting pair: the benevolent Prospero and the rapacious Sycorax. However, upon closer analysis, the differences between the two characters disappear and the similarities grow. For example, Prospero, like Sycorax, coerces Ariel into doing his bidding, using the sprite to regain his inheritance as a duke, and tortures Caliban with magic the way Sycorax tortured Ariel. Also, both Prospero and Sycorax were exiled from their respective homelands and both have children, which was possibly the reason why they were both spared being executed. The fine line between Sycorax's black magic and Prospero's white blurs even further during his renunciation of magic in Act V, a speech which has strong parallels to one given by the dark witch Medea in the Metamorphoses. In comparing himself to Medea, Prospero is implicitly comparing himself to Sycorax. Emphasizing the relationship between Prospero and Sycorax demonstrates the ambiguity of Prospero's supposedly benevolent character.

=== Sycorax as mother ===
Sycorax has been described as the matriarchal figure of The Tempest. Modernist authors such as Sylvia Plath and Ted Hughes have alluded to Sycorax in their writing to illustrate destructive feminine power. As Hughes writes, "... the difficult task of any poet in English [is] to locate the force which Shakespeare called Venus in his first poems and Sycorax in his last." By emphasising the female power found in characters such as Sycorax, Plath and Hughes hoped to counteract what they saw as the patriarchal nature of canonical Western literature. Feminist critics, however, have maintained that matriarchal readings of Sycorax are shallow, as they often find importance only in Sycorax's motherhood rather than in her thoughts, feelings, and past life.

=== Ethnicity ===
Some critics have seen both Caliban and Sycorax as instances of indeterminate racial or ethnic identity. Leah Marcus argues that the phrase "blue-eyed hag", suggests racial uncertainty because "as a blue-eyed Algerian Sycorax would have failed to fit our racial stereotypes in a number of interesting ways [w]e tend not to think of Africans as blue eyed, even though North Africans of 'Argier' and elsewhere sometimes are." Most critics have interpreted the phrase "blue eyed" to be a reference to blueish rings around the eyes, indicating tiredness or pregnancy, on the grounds that this was the most common meaning of the term at the time. However both Marcus and Diane Purkiss suggest that a reference to race might be implied, suggesting that Sycorax's ethnicity cannot be clearly defined, as although she was born in Algiers, her parentage is not known. Kelsey Ridge, who argued that the Algiers-born Sycorax was a coloniser who stole the island from Ariel and his people, suggested that Sycorax's blue eyes "do not disprove her North African lineage, and indeed they may serve to call attention to the similarity of her to the other colonisers."

=== Avoiding execution ===
Scholars have wondered what it was that Sycorax did to avoid execution, as described in act one, scene two by Prospero: "for one thing she did / They [the Algerians] would not take her life." Charles Lamb, a Romantic writer fascinated by Shakespeare and his works, and particularly intrigued by this question, found in John Ogilby's "Accurate Description of Africa" (1670) two versions of a story about Emperor Charles V's invasion of Algiers in 1541, relating that a witch (not named in the source text) had advised the commander of the city not to surrender, predicting the destruction of the besieging fleet, which was accomplished nine days later by a "dreadful tempest". The principal version given claims that she was "richly remunerated" but the alternative version, "to palliate the shame and the reproaches that are thrown upon them for making use of a witch," attributes the storm to the prayers of a holy man named Cidy Utica.

Later scholars, however, have argued that Sycorax was saved from execution because she was pregnant. This was not uncommon, as many female criminals in Shakespeare's day got pregnant to avoid execution.

== Sycorax in later versions of the play ==
Claire Davenport as Sycorax breastfeeds her adult son Caliban, played by Jack Birkett, in Derek Jarman's film version of The Tempest.

Sycorax has been conceptualised in a variety of ways by adapters and directors of The Tempest. In John Dryden and William Davenant's version of The Tempest (1670), Sycorax is survived by two children, Caliban and a daughter also named Sycorax. This second Sycorax makes sexual advances toward Trinculo, the drunken sailor, and (according to Trinculo) also has incestuous relations with her brother Caliban. Die Geisterinsel, a 1778 version of the play in German, includes a living Sycorax, a witch who has full power during the night, while Prospero rules the day. In this play, she is the one who causes the tempest and shipwreck, not Prospero; Prospero is extremely wary of her actions as each night approaches, as she has power over those who sleep. Several times he struggles to keep Miranda awake to protect her from Sycorax's power. In Eugène Scribe's French 1846 version, Sycorax is alive but imprisoned behind some rocks out of sight. She spends most of the play trying to convince her son, Caliban, to free her. Peter Brook's 1968 British version of the play portrayed Sycorax as an ugly witch, including her in a birth scene in which the equally ugly Caliban is born.

Film versions of The Tempest have portrayed Sycorax in flashbacks of the island's history. In Derek Jarman's 1979 version, Sycorax is shown leading Ariel around by a chain and breast feeding an adult Caliban. Peter Greenaway's Prospero's Books (1991) depicts Sycorax as a bald, naked woman covered in peacock feathers; Steven Dillon suggests that Greenaway's vision of Sycorax was inspired by Jarman's.

== Sycorax in later literature ==
In Ernest Renan's play Caliban the anti-hero states that Sycorax went to "all the devils" but left him as rightful ruler of the island. Marina Warner reimagined the witch in her 1992 book Indigo, in which Sycorax is a healer and dyer of indigo who uses her magic to help slaves. Her attempts to give up sorcery fail, because "she cannot abjure, give up, control the force by which she is possessed".

In Tad Williams' novel Caliban's Hour (1994), Caliban tells how, although Sycorax was a powerful witch, people in Algiers (especially the mayor) had needed her powers for their own needs and purposes, but eventually they had turned on her; after she was denounced and arrested,

"So frightened were they of her magical words, her curses, that they scorched out her tongue with a heated iron-but even that was not enough. Afraid that the killing of even a silenced witch would bring a plague of bad luck down on them, they put her in a boat, my pregnant mother, and towed her out to the open sea, where she was set adrift."

Caliban further states that although mute, Sycorax was able to communicate with him by putting pictures into his mind, and that her death was caused by her choking on a fish bone two years before Prospero and Miranda's arrival.

J.B. Aspinall's novel Sycorax (2006) places the origin of the story with a 14th-century peasant woman from Yorkshire. The Indian poet Suniti Namjoshi in Sycorax: New Fables and Poems imagines Sycorax returning to the island after Prospero and the others have left (including Caliban). Namjoshi has stated, "The Sycorax in my poem is still alive... She is still defiant, still fierce, but she is old and knows that death is no longer so far away that it need not be thought of... I wanted to follow Sycorax, keep her company, as it were, up to the final moment".

Sycorax is also revived in the "Baroque pastiche" opera The Enchanted Island, devised by Jeremy Sams, in the first production of which she was played by Joyce DiDonato.

A witch named Sycorax appears in the opera Faust by Louis Spohr.

Nydia Hetherington's novel Sycorax (Quercus, 2025) imagines the life of the character before the events recounted by Shakespeare.

== Other uses of Sycorax ==
=== Sycorax in music ===
The Decemberists' 2006 album The Crane Wife features the song "The Island/Come and See" which references Sycorax in the line "its contents watched by Sycorax / and Patagon in parallax".

=== Sycorax in astronomy ===
The name Sycorax is the name given to one of the satellites of Uranus.

=== Sycorax in Science Fiction ===
The Sycorax are an alien race of warriors in Doctor Who. They make their first appearance in "The Christmas Invasion".

=== Sycorax in Theatre ===
Makram Ayache’s Dora Award–winning play A Witch in Algiers reimagines Shakespeare’s The Tempest through the perspective of Sycorax, the exiled Algerian woman only mentioned from the original text. Set against colonial violence and spiritual inheritance, the play reframes magic as survival and resistance, interrogating power, exile, and whose stories are allowed to endure.
