= Vladimir Lucien =

Saint Lucian writer, critic and actor (born 1988)

- Born: 16 March 1988 (age 38); St. Lucia
- Education: St Mary's College; University of the West Indies
- Occupations: Writer, critic and actor
- Notable work: Sounding Ground (2014)
- Awards: OCM Bocas Prize for Caribbean Literature (2015)

Vladimir Lucien (born 16 March 1988) is a writer, critic and actor from St. Lucia. His first collection of poetry, Sounding Ground (2014), won the Caribbean region's major literary prize for anglophone literature, the OCM Bocas Prize for Caribbean Literature, in 2015, making Lucien the youngest ever winner of the prize.

== Career ==
Born on 16 March 1988 in St. Lucia in the eastern Caribbean, Vladimir Lucien grew up in the town of Gros Islet on the island's north. He attended St Mary's College in Castries (1999–2004), where he began his artistic career as an actor, starring in a number of productions. While in his third year reading literature and theatre arts at the University of the West Indies (UWI), St Augustine campus, in Trinidad, he was inspired by the groundbreaking Caribbean writer Kamau Brathwaite, whom he appreciated as "a culturally engaged poet". Lucien has stated: "I started writing poetry seriously when I started UWI in 2008. What I was writing before was coming from a very empty place and it was not much anyway."

Lucien has since had a great deal of success, with his work being published in journals and other publications, including Small Axe, Wasafiri, BIM magazine, The Caribbean Review of Books, Caribbean Beat, Washington Square Review, and the anthology Beyond Sangre Grande, edited by Cyril Dabydeen. Some of Lucien's poetry has been translated into other languages, appearing in Dutch in the literary magazine Tortuca, in Italian in the journal El Ghibli, and in Mandarin.

Awards he has received awards include first prize in the poetry category of the Small Axe Prize 2013, and the overall OCM Bocas Prize for Caribbean Literature 2015 for his 2014 debut collection of poems, Sounding Ground, which was also shortlisted for the Guyana Prize for Caribbean Literature in 2015.

He was the screenwriter of the documentary The Merikins, which had its premiere at the Trinidad and Tobago Film Festival in 2013.

He has participated in various international literary events, including at the Miami Book Fair, the Read My World Festival in Amsterdam, the Jaipur Literary Festival, the Brooklyn Book Festival, the Calabash International Literary Festival, and in 2016 was Writer-in-Residence at the University of the West Indies (Mona, Jamaica).

=== Reception ===
Reviewing Lucien's first book, Jamaican Poet Laureate Mervyn Morris described Sounding Ground as "an impressive collection", and said: "Building on personal and family experience, Lucien reflects and challenges the socio-cultural situation of St Lucia. The bulk of the book presents memorable individuals, recalled with compassion or in anger: story after story of severely limited horizons, a legacy of slavery and colonialism. ...What Lucien does well, and frequently, is persuade us he has known the experience of a range of St Lucians, now and in history; and that he deeply cares."

In the Journal of West Indian Literature, Laurence Breiner wrote: "A distinctive and recognizable voice runs through all of Lucien’s poems, but his tonal variety is both wide and protean. There is a seriousness in his work—even in his wit—which has to do with his respect for the heft of a people’s lived life, and not with any darkness of vision, or moodiness, or angst. His poems have the kind of life-energy to be found in any fresh shovelful of soil. This is poetry of the ground, of the yard and the schoolyard and the provision ground. Lucien digs deep, plants deep, and draws upon depths of resource. In nearly every one of these poems we sense power in reserve, presences that can be felt."

== Selected writings ==
- "Two poems" ("Even Here" and "The Nobodies of Never"), The Caribbean Review of Books, No. 22, July 2010.
- Sounding Ground, Peepal Tree Press, 2014, ISBN 978-1845232399
- Co-editor, Sent Lisi: Poems and Art of. St. Lucia (2014)
- "Growing Up Under Walcott", Peepal Tree Press blog, 20 March 2017.

== See also ==
- Caribbean literature
- Caribbean poetry
