= Isibhasiyaim =

Ancient text of Jainism

Information
- Religion: Jainism
- Chapters: 45
- Sutras: Rishibhashit
- Ancient text of Jainism

Isibhasiyaim (Sanskrit: इसिभासियाइं or Romanised: Isibhāsiyāiṃ) is an ancient text in Jainism tradition. It is also known as Rishibhashit Sutra. It is the collection of the stories and philosophies of the 45 sages of the ancient Indian subcontinent.

== Etymology ==
The literal meaning of Isibhasiyaim is translated as "the sayings of sages". Isibhasiyaim is a compound word having two terms Ishi and bhasiyaim. In the Pali literature, the term used for Rishi is Ishi. Similarly the term bhasiyaim means "speaking or saying".

== Description ==
Isibhasiyaim is the collection of the ideas of the Indian philosophical tradition of Vedic sages, Buddhists and Jain Tirthankars from the 10th century BCE to the 6th century BCE. Apart from the ideas of the sages and Tirthankars, it provides the fundamental principles, emotional philosophical concepts and ethical sermons of them. In the text, nowhere insistence or opposition of any tradition comes into view, rather, there resonance of equanimity is reflected. The text has included the philosophies of forty-five sages. According to Jainism tradition, the twenty sages are of the period of the Tirthankar Neminath, the fifteen sages of the period of the Tirthankar Parsvanath and the ten sages are of the period of the Tirthankar Mahavira. According to the present system of classification of Jain Aagams, it is classified under Prakirnaka texts of Jainism.

The language of the text Isibhasiyaim is a mixed Prakrit language. It is dominated by Magadhi and Ardhamagadhi. At some parts of the text, it has the influence of Shauraseni and Paishachi. Similarly at some parts it has the influence of Maharashtrian dialects.

== Mentions ==
The mention of Rishibhashit is found in the Kalik Sutras enumerated in the Nandi Sutras and Pakkhi Sutras of Jainism. Similarly it is mentioned in the list of the twelve texts of the Anga-Baahya in Tattvarthabhashya by Acharya Umaswati.

== Concepts ==
The text Isibhasiyaim included the theme that a life of renunciation is inadequate unless it is accompanied by the specific ethical conduct of Jainism.

The text quotes as

"Whoever conquers mind and passion, and acts with true austerity, shines like a fire into which the oblation has been poured."

— Isibhasiyaim 29.17

== List of the 45 sages ==
The list of the forty five sages mentioned in the text Isibhasiyaim are

1. Narada - In Jainism tradition, Narada is presented as the author of the title "Truth is Purgation" which is the first chapter of the Jain text Rishimandal. In the text Rishibhashit, he called as Arhat Rishi and the future 21st Tirthankar Vimal in the coming next time cycle of Jainism.
2. Vajjiyaputta - Vajjiputta was the preacher of the principles of Karma from Lichchhavi clan. He is considered as the contemporary of Mahavira and Buddha. Some scholars also identified him identical to the Vedic sage Vastiputra mentioned in Brihadaranyaka Upanishad.
3. Deval - Asita Devala is addressed as Arhat Rishi in the text Rishibhashit. He was the preacher of concepts of Moksha. He taught the path of detachment. In the Vedic tradition Asita and Devala are two the sages connected to the Shandilya Gotra, but in the Jainism text Isibhasiyaim Asita Devala is a single sage not two.
4. Angiras
5. Pushpashalputra
6. Valkalchiri
7. Kurmaputra
8. Kaitaliputra
9. Mahakashyap
10. Taitaliputra
11. Mankhaliputra
12. Yajnavalkya
13. Bhayali
14. Bahuk
15. Madhurayan
16. Shauryayan
17. Vidu
18. Varshap
19. Aryayan
20. Utkal
21. Gathapatiputra Tarun
22. Dagbhal
23. Ramputra
24. Harigiri
25. Ambad
26. Matanga
27. Varratak
28. Ardrak
29. Vardhman
30. Vayu
31. Parshwa
32. Ping
33. Arun
34. Rishigiri
35. Uddlaka
36. Tarayan
37. Shrigiri
38. Satiputra Buddha
39. Sanjaya
40. Dwaipayan
41. Indranag
42. Soma
43. Yama
44. Varuna
45. Vaishraman
