= John Robert Lee =

John Robert Lee may refer to:

- John Lee (Australian politician)
- John Robert Lee (poet)

== See also ==
- John Lee (disambiguation)
