= Blas Jiménez =

Blas R. Jiménez
- Born: Blas R. Jiménez; August 2, 1949; Santo Domingo, Dominican Republic
- Died: November 13, 2009 (aged 60)
- Occupations: Poet; activist; scholar; professor; essayist; diplomat

Blas R. Jiménez (August 2, 1949 – November 13, 2009) was a Dominican black nationalist, poet and essayist of African descent. His poetry and essays appeared in specialized journals in the Dominican Republic, Puerto Rico, the United States of America, Costa Rica, Brazil, Colombia, and Uruguay. He is considered to have been "foremost among those poets claiming an African identity contrary to ethnic classification norms in the Dominican Republic."

== Personal life ==
Blas married Dulce María Guzmán in the late seventies with whom he had three children: Iván, Isis and Alan. He was survived also by his brothers, Rafael and Jose, his sisters Eulalia, Dulce, and Nancy, and his father Blas Rafael Jiménez Sr.

== Public activism ==
Blas Jiménez was dedicated to increasing the value of historic, cultural, and ecological tourism in the Dominican Republic and is considered an Afro-Dominican cultural icon in his nation. He dedicated his life to promoting the value of African Heritage in Dominican culture, and published multiple poetry compilations including "Versos del Negro Blas". He spent a number of years in the United States and was once involved in a dispute with a passport official at customs and immigrations in Santo Domingo who told him to write "Dark Indian" as his race and Blas refused and insisted that he was black.

Jiménez struck a major blow against invisibility by asking questions about black and national identity. He did not hesitate to proclaim his own Black identity, and took as his mission the task of forcing others to do the same.

He was probably one of the first writers to utilize his lyrical literary voice to proclaim and African identity and to expose the polemics of ethnic classification in the Dominican Republic.

== Awards ==
Professor Jiménez was the 1998 winner of the Ethel L. Payne International award for excellence in journalism – Individual Journalist - The African Diaspora. In 2004 he was awarded the title of Professor Emeritus by the Pontificia Universidad Católica Madre y Maestra, where he lectured in Caribbean Literature and African Heritage.

== Diplomat and government work ==
From 2000 to 2003 Professor Jiménez served as Secretary General of the Dominican Commission for the United Nations Educational, Scientific, and Cultural Organization (UNESCO).

== Published works ==
- Haitiano (1980)
- El Nativo Versos en cuentos para espantar zombies (1996)
- En la esclavitud (2004)
- Afrodominicano por elección, negro por nacimiento : seudoensayos (2008)
- Aquí Otro Español, 1980 1st edition / 2000 2nd edition.
- Caribe Africano en Despertar, 1984
- Caribe Africano en Despertar – bilingual edition, 2006
- Exigencias de un Cimarrón (En Sueños), 1987
- Afrodominicano por elección, negro por nacimiento (pseudoessays), 2008
- Desde la Orilla hacia una nacionalidad sin desalojos. Collection of essays. Silvio Torres Saillant, Ramona Hernandez, and Blas Jiménez. 2004

== See also ==
- Caribbean literature
- Caribbean poetry
