= Limbo (Brathwaite poem) =

Poem by Edward Kamau Brathwaite

"Limbo" is a poem by Barbadian poet Edward Kamau Brathwaite.

It describes the similarity between a limbo dance and the transportation of African slaves into the West Indies and America.
