= Post-theism =

Variant of nontheism

Post-theism is the belief that religions related to, or focus on the worship of a God or deities belongs to a previous stage of human development and, thus, a division of theism vs. atheism is obsolete. It is a variant of nontheism. The term appears in liberal Christianity and post-Christianity.

== Origin ==
Frank Hugh Foster in a 1918 lecture announced that modern culture had arrived at a "post-theistic stage" in which humanity has taken possession of the powers of agency and creativity that had formerly been projected upon God.

Denys Turner argues that Karl Marx did not choose atheism over theism but rejected the binary Feuerbachian choice in The Essence of Christianity altogether, a position which by being post-theistic is at the same time necessarily post-atheistic. Turner wrote that Marx "appeared to believe that simple atheism—atheism that rests on the straightforward negation and reversal of what theism claims—is as ideological as the theism it all too simply rejects." (page 336)

At one point, Marx argued "there should be less trifling with the label 'atheism'", as he insisted "religion in itself is without content, it owes its being not to heaven but to the earth, and with the abolition of distorted reality, of which it is the theory, it will collapse of itself."

== See also ==
- Apatheism
- God is dead
- Humanism
- Postmodern Christianity
- Roland Boer
- Samkhya
- Transtheism
- Universalism
- Virtuous pagan

== Sources ==
- H. J. Adriannse, "After Theism" in: H. A. Krop, Arie L. Molendijk, Hent de Vries (eds.) Post-Theism: Reframing the Judeo-Christian Tradition (2000), ISBN 978-90-429-0853-6.
- Christoph Schwöbel, "After Post-Theism" in: S. Andersen (ed. ) Traditional Theism and its Modern Alternatives (1994), 161–196.
- Vincent Brümmer, "The Enlightenment Project and the Human Image of God" in: Hans-Georg Ziebertz (ed.), The Human Image of God, BRILL, 2001, 55–72.
