= Emilio Jorge Rodríguez =

Cuban essayist and literary critic (born 1947)

- Born: April 5, 1947 (age 79)

Emilio Jorge Rodríguez (born 1947) is a Cuban essayist and literary critic.

== Early life ==
Rodriguez was born in 1947 on the Caribbean island of Cuba. Rodríguez earned a degree in Spanish and Latin American Literature at the University of Havana. At the time of graduation, Rodríguez also earned a degree/grade as a researcher at the Cuban Academy of Sciences.

== Professional life ==
Rodríguez is known as an essayist, literary critic, literary researcher, literary interpreter, and a literary compiler. He specializes in the study of Caribbean literature and Creolization in Caribbean oral and written discourse.

Rodríguez conducted research at Casa de las Américas Literary Research Center and at the Center of Caribbean Studies during 1972–2000. He was also the director of the Center of Caribbean Studies during 1994–1998 and has served on the board for Scientific Degrees at the Cuban Literature and Linguistic Institute. In addition, he was a part of the awards jury member for Casa de las Américas, the National Culture Award, and the International Orality Contest. Rodríguez was the founder/editor of Anales del Caribe from 1981 to 2000. He is also member on the editorial board of Revista Mexicana del Caribe, Academic Committee of the Biblioteca del Caribe Series, and the Unión de Escritores y Artistas de Cuba.

Rodríguez has also contributed to the Encyclopedia of Caribbean Literature of 2006, and has also written and published many anthologies of Caribbean writers.

Anales del Caribe (1979–) is a magazine/production created by Rodríguez, in collaboration with the Casa de las Américas Center for Caribbean Studies. The purpose of the magazine is to conduct research of the art and literature of the Caribbean and its corresponding diasporas.

== Awards ==
- 1986: Razón de Ser
- 2014: Este Caribe Nuestor at Havana University
- 2017: Casa de las Américas Prize in the category "Studies on the Black Presence in Contemporary America and the Caribbean" for Una Suave, tierna línea de Montañas Azules (which explores the relations between Haitians and Cubans)
- CUNY Caribbean Fellowship
- Fundación Nicolás Guillén Fellowship
- Latin American and Caribbean Third Millennium Essay Award
- Selected for the Visiting Scholars' Program of Africana Studies and Research Center at Cornell University

== Publications ==
Rodríguez has a total of 21 works in 49 publications in various languages, including Spanish (38 publications), French (2 publications), and English (6 publications).

Books:

- Literatura caribeñas; bojeo y cuanderno de bitácora (1989)
- Religiones afroamericanas (1996)
- Acriollamiento y discurso escrit/oral caribeño (2001)
- Trans-Caribbean Literary Identity / Haiti y la transcaribenidad Literaria (2011)
- El Caribe Literario, Trazados de convivencia (2011)
- Haïti et l'identité littéraire trans-caribéenne (2013)
- Una Suave, tierna línea de montañas azules (2017. Casa de las Américas Prize)

Book contributions:

- Panorama hisórico – literario de nuestra América (1982)
- América Latina: Palavara, Literatura, e Cultura (1995)
- Diccionario Enciclopédico de las Letras de América Latina (1996)
- Defining New Idioms as Alternative Forms of Expression (1996)
- A History of Literature in the Caribbean (1997)
- Spain's 1898 Crisis (2000)
- A Pepper Pot of Cultures; Aspects of Creolization in the Caribbean (2003)
- La oralidad: ¿ciencia o sabiduría popular? (2004)
- Encyclopedia of Caribbean Literature (2006)
- Corazón de pelícano – Antología poética de Lasana M. Sekou / Pelican Heart – An Anthology of Poems by Lasana M. Sekou Edited by Emilio Jorge Rodríguez (2010)

Anthologies edited by Rodríguez:

- Efrain Huerta
- Pedro Juan Soto
- Cuentos para ahuyentar el turism: 16 autores puertorriqueños

His writings have also appeared in several magazines, newspapers, and journals, including Bim, Caribbean Quarterly, Revue Internationale de Littérature Comparée, Del Caribe, Gacetaole Cuba, and Letras Cubanas.

== Literary analysis ==
Rodríguez is noted for his work in the area of Caribbean literature and the creolization in Caribbean oral and written discourse, and he has written six publications exploring these concepts, although his work has been mostly editorial, literary research, and literary compilation of writings by other Caribbean authors. "Rodríguez is not so much a literary critic as a literary historian," wrote J. Michael Dash of New York University in a book review of Rodríguez's Haiti and Trans-Caribbean Identity.

Rodríguez's books explore the relations between Caribbean islands but specifically home in on Haitian relations. In Haiti and Trans-Caribbean Identity, he explores relations between Haiti and Cuba through a series of essays based on famous Haitian authors such as Fernand Hibbert, Jacques Stephen Alexis, Alejo Carpentier, and Nicolás Guillén. "The only writers who meet Rodríguez's approval are those in whom the 'revolutionary and the artist' merge," noted Dash. Rodríguez believes that there needs to be a greater importance and recognition of the relations and interactions between Haiti and its neighboring countries post-Haitian revolution (1791–1804). He explores how a sort of "creolization" is occurring through the noted culture sharing/blending between Haitians and Cubans.

Although Rodríguez has won several notable awards for his work in this area of study, he has also been criticized for focusing heavily on Haiti's relations with its Hispanic counterparts. "The geographical reach of the essays can hardly be called 'trans-Caribbean' when the real focus appears to be the literary contacts between Haiti and the Hispanic Caribbean," notes Dash. In addition to the criticism of his area-specific analysis, Dash notes a note of bias in Rodríguez's work. "At times more commissar than critic, his ultimate approval or disapproval depends on whether the novelist does or does not 'understand class struggle' (p. 146)."
