= Telcine Turner-Rolle =

Telcine Turner-Rolle (December 3, 1944 – May 17, 2012) was a Bahamian educator, playwright and poet.

She was born in New Providence and was educated at the University of the West Indies at Northwestern University and at the Institute of Children's Literature. She married James O. Rolle in June 1974; they had one son, Arien. She taught at several high schools and at the Bahamas Teachers Training College. Turner-Rolle joined the College of The Bahamas in 1976 and later became chair of humanities there.

Turner-Rolle published a book of poems for children Song of the Surreys and also edited several collections of works by students from her creative writing classes. Turner-Rolle is best known for the play Woman Take Two; it was awarded the Playwriting Prize in the University of West Indies 25th Anniversary Literary Competition. She was part of the Bahama Drama Circle and help stage summer theatre productions at the auditorium of the Bahamas Teachers Training College.

She died at the age of 67.
