= List of lighthouses in Saint Lucia =

This is a list of lighthouses in Saint Lucia.

== Lighthouses ==
| Name | Image | Year built | Location & coordinates | Class of light | Focal height | NGA number | Admiralty number | Range nml |
|---|---|---|---|---|---|---|---|---|
| Battery Point Lighthouse | | n/a | Vieux Fort; 13°43′23.8″N 60°57′13.5″W | Fl Y 2.5s. | 4 metres (13 ft) | 15045.5 | J5800.6 | 5 |
| Cape a Moule a Chique Lighthouse | Image | 1912 | Vieux Fort; 13°42′41.2″N 60°56′38.5″W | Fl W 5s. | 227 metres (745 ft) | 15048 | J5798 | 22 |
| Castries West Wharf Range Rear Lighthouse | | n/a | Castries; 14°00′23.6″N 60°59′11.6″W | F R | 34 metres (112 ft) | 15020 | J5793 | 5 |
| Mathurin Point Lighthouse | | n/a | Vieux Fort; 13°42′46.9″N 60°57′27.0″W | VQ (2) W 5s. | 5 metres (16 ft) | 15036 | J5799 | 2 |
| Tapion Rock | Image | 1843 est. | Castries; 14°00′58.1″N 61°00′23.1″W | Q G | 15 metres (49 ft) | 15004 | J5792 | 2 |
| Vigie Lighthouse | Image | 1914 | Vigie; 14°01′20.2″N 61°00′04.5″W | Fl (2) W 10s. | 98 metres (322 ft) | 15000 | J5791 | 22 |

== See also ==
- Lists of lighthouses and lightvessels
