= Kendel Hippolyte =

Saint Lucian poet and playwright

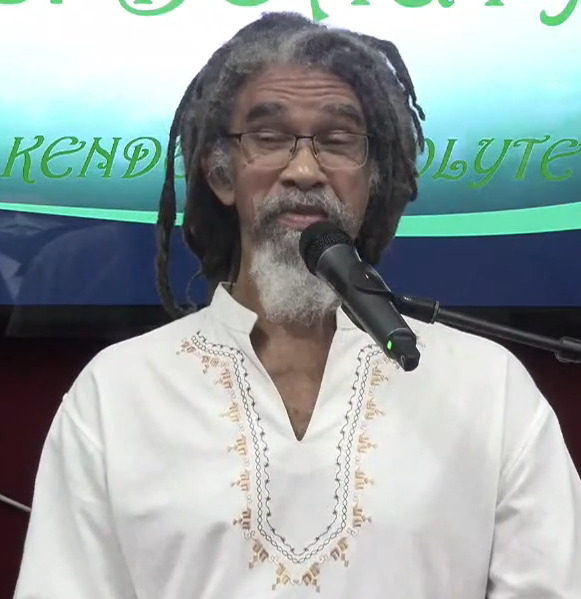
Hippolyte delivers the 2022 Derek Walcott Lecture

Kendel Hippolyte (born 1952) is a St Lucian poet and playwright.

== Biography ==
Kendel Hippolyte was born in Castries, the capital of St Lucia, and was educated at the University of the West Indies in Jamaica. He worked as a teacher at St Mary's College in Vigie, Castries, and the Sir Arthur Lewis College at the Morne. He is actively involved as a playwright and director with the Lighthouse Theatre Company, of which he was a co-founder.

He has written eight plays. His best known, Drum-maker, uses idiomatic Caribbean language to explore the indigenous local culture in a political context. He has published several collections of verse, characterized by its modernist-free style. He is also the editor of the anthologies Confluence: Nine Saint Lucian Poets (1988) and So Much Poetry in We People (1990).

In 2000, he was awarded the St. Lucia Medal of Merit (Gold) for Contribution to the Arts. In 2013, he won the poetry category of the OCM Bocas Prize for Caribbean Literature for his 2012 poetry collection, Fault Lines.

He is married to poet the Jane King.

== Publications ==
- Island in the Sun, Side Two... , 1980
- Bearings 1986
- The Labyrinth 1991
- Birthright, 1997
- Night Vision, TriQuarterly Books, Northwestern University Press, 2005
- Fault Lines, Peepal Tree Press, 2012
