= Marion Bethel =

Bahamian attorney (born 1953)

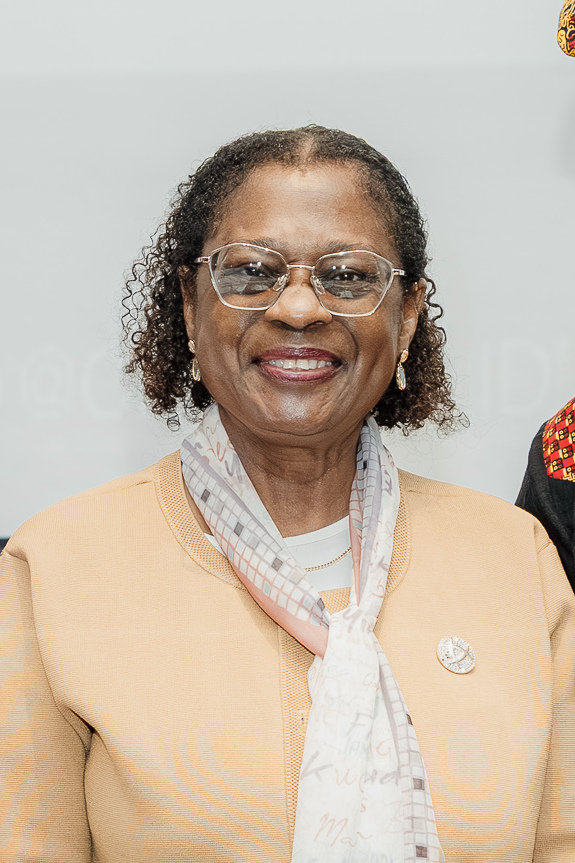
- Born: 31 July 1953 (age 73); Nassau, The Bahamas
- Education: McGill University; Wolfson College, Cambridge University; Columbia University
- Occupations: Poet, essayist, filmmaker, human and gender rights activist
- Notable work: Guanahani, My Love (2009); Bougainvillea Ringplay (2009); Womanish Ways: Freedom, Human Rights & Democracy, the Women's Suffrage Movement in The Bahamas 1934 to 1962 (2012)
- Awards: Casa de las Américas Prize (1995); Triennial Award for Women (2014)

Marion Bethel (born 31 July 1953) is a Bahamian attorney, poet, essayist, filmmaker, human and gender rights activist, and writer.

Bethel is best known for her collections of poems, Guanahani, My Love and Bougainvillea Ringplay. Her work has appeared in publications including The Caribbean Writer, The Massachusetts Review and Junction, an anthology of Bahamian writing. She is also recognized for her 2012 documentary film on the women's suffrage movement in The Bahamas, entitled Womanish Ways: Freedom, Human Rights & Democracy 1934 to 1962, which received the 2012 Award in Documentary at the Urban Suburban International Film Festivall. Her passionate involvement in the Women's Movement in the Caribbean earned her the 11th Caribbean Community (CARICOM) Triennial Award for Women in 2014. Bethel has also received the Casa de las Américas Prize for poetry, and has spoken at many events, including The IV International Poetry Festival of Granada.

She resides with her husband Alfred Sears in The Bahamas, where she is a managing partner at Sears & Co. She now focuses on political activism in civil society in The Bahamas and began serving on the United Nations Committee on the Elimination of Discrimination Against Women (CEDAW) on 1 January 2017.

In 2025 she was elected to serve as a commissioner of the Inter-American Commission on Human Rights (IACHR).

== Early life and education ==
After receiving her Bachelor of Arts degree in Spanish with honors at McGill University, Bethel received her Bachelor of Arts degree in law at Wolfson College, Cambridge University. While in England, she pursued her certificate of legal education at the Council of Legal Education and later pursued her Master of Arts Degree at Columbia University. Before taking her bar examinations in 1987, Bethel spent a summer writing a collections of poems later to be published as Guanahani, My Love (originally Guanahani, mi amor: Y otros poemas), which won the prestigious Casa de las Americas Prize of Poetry, making her one of the few Caribbean writers to receive this award.

== Later life ==
While working on her first manuscript, Guanahani, My Love, Bethel attended the Caribbean Writers Summer Institute at the University of Miami in 1991, where she worked with two well known Barbadian writers, George Lamming and Kamau Braithwaite. Following the death of Southern Christian Leadership Conference founder and civil rights pioneer Evelyn Lowery, Bethel's film Womanish Ways: Freedom, Human Rights & Democracy 1934 to 1962 was showcased at Spelman College and she met some of Atlanta's most influential African-American entrepreneurs and activists, in addition to former vice-president of Tyler Perry Studios and CEO/President of Bobbcat Films Rogger Bobb. Later that week, billionaire Dr Bill Allen treated Marion Bethel and The Bahamas Consul General to lunch, during which Consul General Randy Rolle stated that people like her have much to contribute as it pertains to sharing the history of The Bahamas.

== Career ==
After passing her bar exams in September 1984, Bethel was admitted as an attorney-at-law to the Bar of England and Wales in 1985 and The Bahamas in 1986 while practicing administrative law, company law, commercial law, contracts, conveyancing, immigration law, insurance law, and matrimonial law. From 1896 to 1994, she then went on to work in the Office of the Attorney General; in 1997, she was named the Alice Proskauer Fellow at the Bunting Institute of Radcliffe College, Harvard University, while also writing Bougainvillea Ringplay during her spare time.

In June 2005, Bethel began a three-part poetry workshop at the Cave Canem retreat for African-American poets, at the University of Pittsburgh. In 2012, she directed Womanish Ways: Freedom, Human Rights & Democracy: The Women’s Suffrage Movement in The Bahamas 1948 to 1962, a documentary film on the struggle to gain Bahamian women the right to vote. Her passion for the Women's Movement in the Caribbean and The Bahamas became evident from this movie and she received widespread support from many African, European, and Asian countries. Bethel was elected to serve on the Committee of the United Nations Convention on the Elimination of All Forms of Discrimination Against Women from 1 January 2017 to 31 December 2019. Bethel was re-elected to the Committee on the Elimination of All Forms of Discrimination Against Women for the term 2021–2024 term. She currently works as a managing partner at Sears & Co. and she was working on a third collection of poetry and a novel.

In 2025 she was elected to serve as a commissioner of the Inter-American Commission on Human Rights (IACHR) from 2026 to 2028. She was one of three new commissioners. The others were the American Rosa María Payá and José Luis Caballero Ochoa from Mexico.

=== Writing ===
Before finishing her bar examinations, Bethel spent a full summer writing a draft of Guanahani, My Love, her first book of poems, published in 1994, and later to be reissued by House of Nehesi Publishers in 2009. Her second poetry book, Bougainvillea Ringplay, was published by Peepal Tree Press in 2009, receiving positive review coverage, including from Fred D'Aguiar, Lorna Goodison, Antjie Krog, and Olive Senior.

She has been a guest star at various international events including the Caribbean Women Writers and Scholars Conference, Florida International University, in April 1996, the IV International Poetry Festival of Granada, the Miami International Book Fair in November 1997, the Caribbean Women Writers Series at Duke University in February 2002 and the XVI International Poetry Festival of Medellín in June 2006 in Medellín, Colombia. Additionally, House of Nehesi Publishers invited her as a guest poet and workshop presenter to their 5th Annual St. Martin BookFair in May 2007. Her work has been featured in The Caribbean Writer, Volume 8, Moving Beyond, and in the anthologies of Bahamian poetry Junction and From the Shallow Seas. Bethel is also a contributor to New Daughters of Africa (2019), edited by Margaret Busby.

=== Films ===
Bethel acted as Ms. Wells in the 2008 movie Rain – which also featured Renel Brown, Nicki Micheaux and C. C. H. Pounder – and is better known for the documentary film she directed on the women's suffrage movement in The Bahamas. Entitled Womanish Ways: Freedom, Human Rights & Democracy, the Women's Suffrage Movement in The Bahamas 1934 to 1962, this documentary was showcased by Bahamas Consulate Office of Atlanta at Spelman College after the death of Southern Christian Leadership Conference founder and civil rights pioneer Evelyn Lowery.

== Bibliography ==
=== Poetry collections ===
- Guanahani, My Love. Philipsburg, St. Martin, Caribbean: House of Nehesi, 2009, ISBN 978-0-913441-96-1.
  - Originally published as a bi-lingual edition as Guanahani, mi amor: Y otros poemas, Casa de las Américas, 1994, ISBN 9789590400292.
- Bougainvillea Ringplay, Peepal Tree Press, 2009, ISBN 9781845230845.

== Awards and recognition ==
In July 1991, Bethel received a James Michener Fellowship in the Department of English at the University of Miami by the Caribbean Writers Summer Institute. She was one of few Caribbean writers to receive the Casa de las Américas Prize for her collection of poems in Guanahani, mi amor: Y otros poemas (1994).

Additionally, Bethel is the first Bahamian to receive the CARICOM award, which she was given in 2014 for her contribution towards gender justice and culture and the socio-economic development of the Caribbean. One way she has contributed to gender justice and culture is through her documentary film Womanish Ways: Freedom, Human Rights & Democracy, the Women's Suffrage Movement in The Bahamas 1948 to 1962, on the struggle to gain Bahamian women the right to vote, which received the 2012 Award in Documentary at the Urban Suburban International Film Festival in Philadelphia, despite interventions on behalf of female members of parliament Hope Strachan and Loretta Butler. However, representative for Englerston Glenys Hanna Martin states that Bethel's documentary was a "beautiful, powerful piece of work".

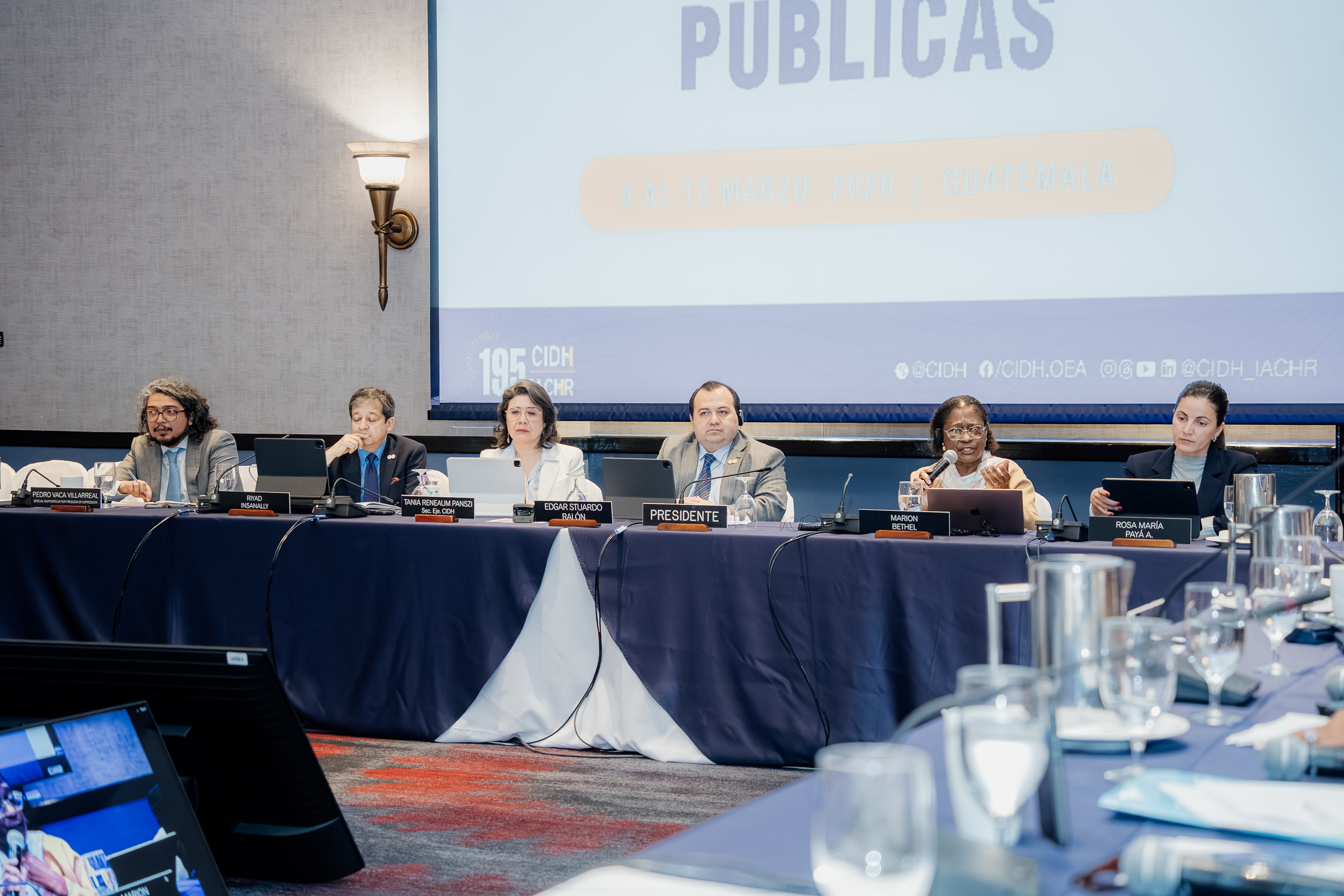
IACHR meeting in March 2026 (last but one on the right)

In 2023, Bethel was elected as Vice-Chairperson and Rapporteur of the United Nations Human Rights Committee on Women & Girls Rights.

Bethel was elected a commissioner of the Inter-American Commission on Human Rights in June 2025 by the General Assembly of the Organisation of American States. Her three-year term started in 2026.
