= Prakirnaka Sutra =

The Prakirnaka Sutras (also known simply as the Prakirnaka) are a series of Jain religious texts. Only ten of the twenty Prakirnaka are recognized by the Śvetāmbara Jains.

These Sutras deal with the "Great Virtues", the Mahavratas, and death. They also name hymns and prayers.

The texts were likely written between the 6th and 13th century A.D.

== Contents ==
Contents of the Prakirnaka Sutras:

1. Chatuh shravan - prayers to Arihant, Sidha, Sadhu.
2. Atur pratyakhyana or Ayurpachakhana - This agama (Note: Agamas are Holy Texts in Hinduism, Buddhism and Jainism.) explains prayer and death depending on age.
3. Bhakti parijna or Bhatta parinna explains how to fast.
4. Sanstaraka or Santara
5. Tandulavaitaliya talks about pregnancy and information about the human body.
6. Chandra vedhyaka (Candra-vedhyaka *)
7. Devendrastava - This part lists up the devas, (Note: Deva in Jainism is a term used for heavenly beings) their palaces and their ranking, also it explains the stars, the planets, the moon and the sun.
8. Ganita vidhya (Gaṇi-vidyā *)
9. Mahapratyakhyana contains advice how to become free from sin and how to repent.
10. Virstava
11. Shvetambhara Murtipujaka

* Name used by Nalini Balbir

== See also ==
- Transtheism

== Literature ==
- Paul Dundas (1992). Routledge (ed.). The Jains. London, New York. ISBN 0-415-26606-8.
- Flügel, Peter; Qvarnström, Olle (2015). Routledge (ed.). Jaina scriptures and philosophy. London, New York. ISBN 9781138839892.
