= Vigie =

- Interactive map of Vigie
- Coordinates: 14.0188°N 60.9960°W
- Country: Saint Lucia
- District: Castries
- City: Castries
- Vigie Lighthouse
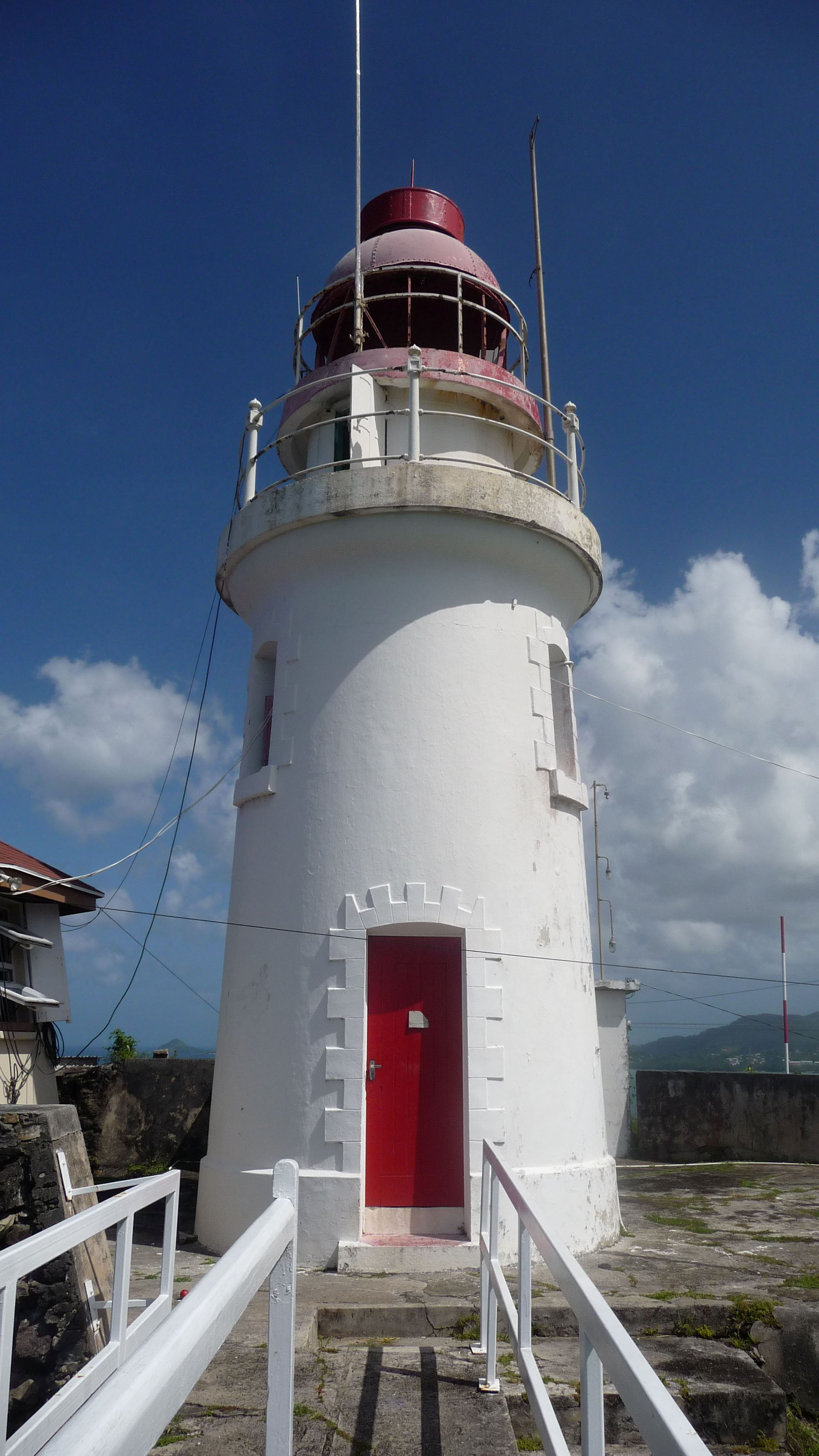
- Constructed: 1914
- Construction: masonry tower
- Height: 11 m (36 ft)
- Shape: cylindrical tower with balcony and lantern
- Markings: White (tower), red (lantern)
- Focal height: 97 m (318 ft)
- Range: 22 nmi (41 km; 25 mi)
- Characteristic: Fl(2) W 10s

Vigie is part of Castries, Saint Lucia.

The French established a village at the base of Vigie Hill in 1745, and a military headquarters on Vigie Height. Three forts were built, Choc Fort facing Choc Bay, Fort St. Victor at the entrance to Grand Carénage Bay (Castries Harbor), and Fort Montagu overlooking Petit Carénage Bay.

George F. L. Charles Airport, one of Saint Lucia's two airports, is located in this part, and Vigie Beach, as well as one of Saint Lucia's two lighthouses.

The Prime Minister's official residence and Saint Mary's College are also located in Vigie.

== See also ==
- List of lighthouses in Saint Lucia
