= Nidaa Khoury =

Arab-Israeli poet, professor

- نداء خوري נידאא ח'ורי
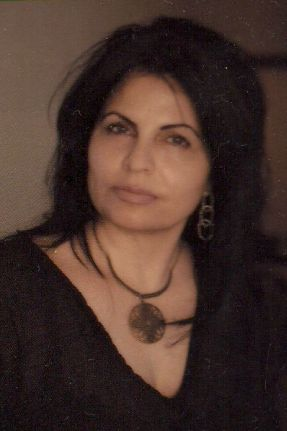
- Born: 1959 (age 66–67); Fassuta, Israel
- Education: University of Haifa University of Latvia Tel Aviv University
- Occupation: Arabic poet

Nidaa Khoury (Arabic: نداء خوري; Hebrew: נידאא ח'ורי) is a lecturer at Ben-Gurion University in the Department of Hebrew literature. She is also the first Arab-Israeli poet to be included within the literature Bagrut curriculum in Israel.

== Personal life ==
Nidaa Khoury was born in Fassuta, Upper Galilee, to a family originating in Aleppo, the third-born of four siblings. Her father worked in the textile industry. When she was 14, Khoury was sent to Saint Joseph Internal School for Girls in Nazareth. She married at age 17, when she had to leave school, and had four children. "Nidaa" is a pen name meaning "a voice calls".

Khoury worked at Mercantile Discount Bank for nine years, after which she embarked on her academic path, wherein she studied advertising and public relations at Haifa University (1994). She studied fine arts administration and got certified as a community center director, also at Haifa University (1996). She earned a Bachelor's degree in philosophy and comparative literature from Haifa University (1995–98), and a Master's in education and behavioral studies from Latvia University (2000). She studied industrial entrepreneurship and management at Tel Aviv University (2003). She completed a course in company directorship at Ben-Gurion University (2007).

== Works ==
Khoury has published 13 books of poetry, and her works have been translated into many languages. Her 2011 collection Book of Sins (House of Nehesi Publishers), was translated into English by Betsy Rosenberg and nominated for the Warwick Prize. Her 2011 collection, Olive Oil and Pomegranate Crop, was published in Italian as Le stagioni dell’olio e Del melograno by Il Laboratorio le edizioni in Naples. Another Body (2011), published by Keshev leShirá, is a selection of Khoury's poems written from 1987 to 2010, some written in Hebrew, and others translated from Arabic by Prof. Sasson Somekh, Dr. Hanna Amit Cochavi, and Prof. Na’im Aryadi. Her book Barefoot River was translated into Hebrew by Rozha Tabor and published by Eshkolót Publishers in 1990.

=== Poetry collections ===
- 2018 – Book of Horses كتاب الخيول published by Kul-shee, Haifa
- 2011 – Book of Sins. A trilingual book of poetry (English, Arabic كتاب الخطايا, Hebrew). House of Nehesi Publishers, St. Martin, Caribbean. (Translators: Betsy Rosenberg; Prof. Sasson Somekh, Dr. Hannah Amit-Cochavi, Prof. Na’im Aridy.)
- 2011 – Olive Oil and Pomegranate Crop مواسم الزيت والرمان published in Italian as Le stagioni dell’olio e del melograno by Il Laboratorio le edizioni, Naples
- 2011 – Another Body בגוף אחר, published by Keshev leShirá, Tel Aviv [Hebrew]
- 2011 – The Book of the Flaw كتاب الخلل published by Kul-shee, Haifa
- 2000 – The Prettiest of Gods Cry أجمل الآلهات تبكي published by Markaz al-Khadara, Cairo
- 1998 – Rings of Salt خواتم الملح published by Al-Muassa al-Arabiyya, Beirut
- 1993 – The Culture of Wine ثقافة النبيذ al-Nahada, Nazareth
- 1992 – The Belt of Wind زنار الريح 2nd edition, Beirut
- 1990 – Barefoot River נחל יחף published by Eshkolót, Jerusalem (translated into Hebrew)
- 1990 – The Belt of Wind
- 1989 – Braid of Thunder جديلة الرعد al-Sharak, Shfarám
- 1987 – Declaring My Silence أعلن لك صمتي published by Abu-Rahmon, Akko

=== Works in progress ===
- Post-monotheism ما بعد الأديان – prose
- In the Shadow of Struggle في ظل الصراع – a Hebrew language study on Palestinian women poetry in Israel.

== Extra-academic activities ==
- Member, International Forum of the National Library since 2014
- Member, Israel Council of Museums, 2009–11
- Member, Education Committee and Committee for the Advancement of Women for the City of Beer Sheva from 2007
- Member, Evaluation Committee, Beer Sheva Acting School from 2010
- Member, board of directors of the NGO Al-Nahood for Advancement of Bedouin Women since 2007
- Coordinator, Higher Arab Monitoring Committee, Round Tables Project to draft a strategy for Arabs in Israel
- Established the NGO Bakaa ["survival"] for volunteering in Arab society, and directed it from 2003 to 2011
- Member, board of directors, Schools Online, 2003-8; member, NAS, 2003-4; member, steering committee, Galilee Movement, 2001-5; member, Scheinìm leDu-Kiyúm ["neighbors for coexistence"], 2000-5; member, Derech haShalom ["path of peace"], 1997-9; member, Israel Writers’ Association, 1995–2008; member, Association of Arab Writers in Israel, 1991-9
- In 2009, the short film Kriá leShtiká ["call to silence"] (dir. Omrì Liór, prod. Linda Neuman) was released as part of nóf haMilìm ["words with a view"], documenting people engaged in the humanities. The film is about Khoury's life and her worldview, and won first Prize at the Gaffers Festival in Sacramento, CA.
- In 2011, Khoury's poems were combined with those of Yiftach Ben-Aharon and served as the basis for the production Eh-ah-mód baTachanót ["I’ll stand at stations"] by Yaakov and Miriam Orman at Ha-Milá Theater at Harduf
- In 2012, Khoury became the first Arab poet since Israel's establishment to be included in the literature curriculum in Jewish schools.
- By 2016, Khoury published 12 books of poetry in Arabic, Hebrew (three books), English, and Italian. Her poetry has been translated into German, Dutch, French, Spanish, Albanian, Italian, English, and Hebrew. Her 1997 book Ha-Katár ha-Már ["the bitter boxcar"] was censored in Jordan.
- Khoury has participated in nearly 30 international conferences on poetry, literature, and education. Forty books contain articles and other references to her.

== Awards and prizes ==
- 2013 – Shortlisted for the Warwick Prize for Book of Sins (published by House of Nehesi Publishers in 2011).
- 2012 – Prime Minister's Hebrew Writers Prize established by Levi Eshkol.
- 2009 – First Prize for the short biopic Kriá leShtiká (Call to Silence, Omrì Liór, dir., Linda Neuman, prod.), at the Gaffers Festival, Sacramento, CA, USA.
- 2000 – Science, Culture, and Sports Ministry Prize for Artistic Work.
- 1995 – Education Ministry Teacher-Writer Prize.

== Other ==
Khoury's first book, I'll Declare to You My Silence, was published in 1984. Since then, Khoury has published eight more books, among them Rings of Salt, published in Lebanon in 1998 by al-Muassa al-Arabiya, Beirut. Another book, The Most Beautiful Goddess is crying, was published in Egypt in 2000 by Markaz al-Khadara, Cairo. Khoury's 1990 book The Wind Belt was published by Abu-Rachmon in Akko. Khoury's Book of the Flaw (2011) was published by Kolbo Sfarìm in Haifa after being rejected by other regional publishers. It was ultimately published by Kolbo Sfarìm in Haifa in 2011. Book of the Flaw is a modernist book of poetry that addresses Christian theology and challenges the sacrament of Holy Communion as a central Catholic ritual. The collection addresses Christian theology and critiques the sacrament of Holy Communion.

In 2005, Khoury began teaching in the Hebrew Literature Department of Ben-Gurion University. In 2009, she was appointed Senior Lecturer in the department and in the General Studies Department's conflict resolution program. Since 2014, she has served as head of the admissions committee for the conflict resolution program. In 2013, Khoury was appointed Full Professor. She also taught in the Department of Middle East Studies at Ben-Gurion. Since 2011, she has been on the board of directors of the Eliashar Center for the Study of Sephardic Jewry at Ben-Gurion.

== Reception ==
Hannah Amit-Cochavi and Ariel Sheetrit, from the Israeli Writers Concordance, on Khoury: “Her poetry style is sensuous and modernist and her poems stand out in their musicality. Khoury frequently uses first person singular, thus examining the complexities of personal point of view. In addition, she frequently addresses the reader in second person singular, often with vehement defiance. Her poetry exposes her inner world… In contrast, most of her poems focus on oppression of women by men via religion…her writing combines motifs from Christian Scripture and church ritual, which she uses to evoke the intimate ambience that these rituals produce, as well as sharp criticism of the religious establishment…her poetry also contains an element of Ars- Poetical that stems from her awareness of and sensitivity to the power of words and the force of poetry.”

Amit Goldenberg of Beit Avi Hai said of Khoury: “The poet Nidaa Khoury is one of the clearest and most interesting voices in her perspective on the Israeli–Palestinian conflict. Khoury, a champion of the Palestinian struggle, has walked a long path in recent years, and today looks at reality from a fascinating height in all its complexity, seeking to erase boundaries of state and land, and to focus on the individual.”

She is also an active participant in human rights and has participated in over 30 international human rights conferences and literary festivals. These include: The Conference of Arab Poets in Amsterdam; The Conference of Human Rights and Solidarity with the Third World in Paris; The Poetry Festival of Jordan; The International Poetry Festival of Medellin; The St. Martin Book Fair; The Napoli Conference on Human Rights.

She also works for The Forty Association, an organization that works towards securing human rights of the unrecognized Arab villages in Israel.

== Areas of interest ==
- New Arabic literature from a comparative perspective – mainly between Palestinian Arab literature and Hebrew Israeli literature, as well as the related area of gender and Orientalism and women and nationalism since Israel's establishment.
- The Israeli-Palestinian conflict from social-literary perspectives. Via the relationships between literature and psychology, Khoury looks at sources of writing and how Palestinian and Israeli artists use the conflict for self- and group definition.
- View of life and the conflict, distinguishing between view of existence based on philosophy of place and talking about concepts of existence and collective; and perception of experience based on philosophy of time, and talking about concepts of experience and the individual.
- Masculine time vs feminine time, as this distinction reflects the paradox of the Israeli who lives in a female period of time after Israel's establishment as a national home, yet his behavior consistent with a male language; and the Palestinian who lives in a male period – that of the pre-state struggle – while his behavior consistent with a female language, all reflecting the depths of the conflict on both sides.
- Khoury developed the "Dimensions of Creativity" model, a psycho-social framework for analyzing the relationship between language and society in conflict zones. The model combines four planes: psychology, creativity, society, and language. Dimensions of Creativity is a psycho-social model that enables examination and analysis combined to a level of development of society, creativity, language, and the link between structure of language and structure of society.
- The national-political divide. In addition to the historic and geopolitical divide in Palestinian literature, Khoury proposes a new divide, the national-political divide, which rests on the political-national event and concept, and is derived from the extent of effect and how the national-political event shapes reality in general and literature in particular.
- Workshops on developing creativity and creative writing. Khoury conducts workshops for undergraduate students in Hebrew and Arabic; and advanced workshops for Master’s students.
- Conflict Resolution Program – Multiculturalism engages Khoury, and developed a course titled Multicultural Mediation Using the Narrative Approach, co-taught with attorney Yoni Naftali.

== Editing ==
Science editing: Toward Hybrid Poetics: Post-colonial Arabic Literature, Western Modernism Sadak M. Gohar, from English: Oren Mokèd, The Use of Modernist Traditions in Arabic Poetry: A Cultural Look Outward, MiKan [“from here”] 11, 2012.

== Translating ==
Khoury has translated Chamutal Bar-Yosef’s poetry from Hebrew to Arabic: Chamutal Bar-Yoseph_Lieu douloureux _Poèmes, Traduits de l’hébreu en Français par Colette Salem en Arabe par Naïm Araidi, Nidaa Khoury et Mahmoud Abassi Éditions Caractères 2012, composé en Arial et Garamond, a été achevé d’imprimer en- 2013, Imprimé en France (published in France in 2013).
