= Tortuca =

Dutch literature and arts magazine

Tortuca is a Dutch literature and arts magazine published in Rotterdam and available in the Netherlands and Belgium. The name Tortuca has been derived from the mediaeval poem about turtles in Der naturen bloeme from the Flemish writer and poet Jacob van Maerlant.

== History and profile ==
Founded in 1997 by Herbert Verhey and Bas Kwakman as Tortuca Private Press, the name was changed to Tortuca, literature and arts prior to the publication of the first magazine in 1997 [Tortuca 1, Autumn MCMXCVI] and extending the board of editors with musicians, artists and writers.

The pocketbook-size shaped magazine has no illustrations on the cover (only the colour changes per issue) and well balanced and coherent typography in the interior with use of the typefaces Bodoni and Garamond. Apart from prose (short stories) and poetry, Tortuca contains a wide variety of art: from pencil-sketches and photography to designs for curtains and technical drawings. Every issue has a special item like a leporello with selfportraits of Aad Donker on a long strip of paper [Tortuca 8, MCMXCIX, p. 51], the tombstone of Rainer Maria Rilke's grave with twelve translations of his 'untranslatable' epitaph [Tortuca 10, MM, p. 25] or a removable booklet with lyrics by Valentin Silvestrov [Tortuca 14, MMII, p. 20].

Tortuca is also the publisher of Testudo (novels, [translated-] poetry, short stories and prose), Tortuca Cahier [short stories, theatre plays, or exceptional subjects) and Tortuca Vestzak (miniature books).
