= Caliban =

Character in Shakespeare's play The Tempest

- The Tempest character
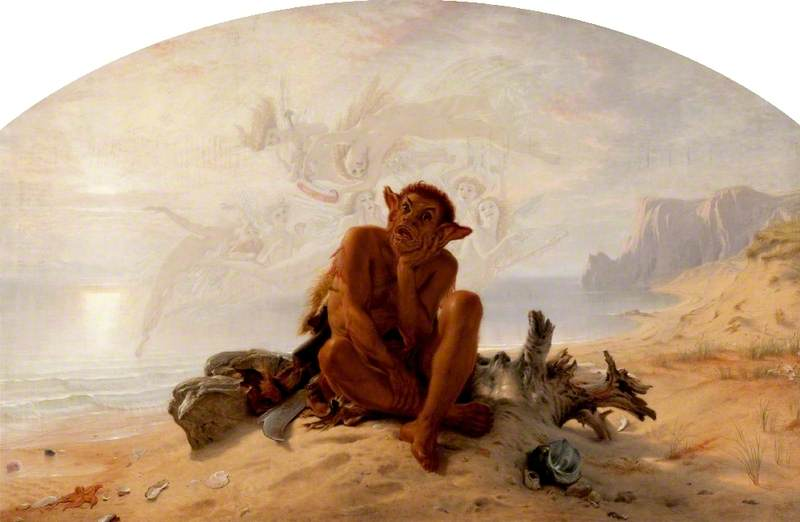
- Caliban by Joseph Noel Paton
- Created by: William Shakespeare

In-universe information
- Family: Sycorax (mother)

Caliban (/ˈkælɪbæn/ KAL-i-ban), the subhuman son of the sea witch Sycorax, is a prominent character in William Shakespeare's play The Tempest.

== Character ==
Caliban is half human, half monster. After his island becomes occupied by Prospero and his daughter Miranda, Caliban is forced into slavery. While he is referred to as a calvaluna or mooncalf, a freckled monster, he is the only human inhabitant of the island that is otherwise "not honour'd with a humane shape" (Prospero, I.2.283). In some traditions, he is depicted as a wild man, or a deformed man, or a beast man, or sometimes a mix of fish and man, a dwarf or even a tortoise.

Banished from Algiers, Sycorax was left on the isle, pregnant with Caliban, and died before Prospero's arrival. Caliban, despite his inhuman nature, clearly loved and worshipped his mother, referring to Setebos as his mother's god, and appealing to her powers against Prospero. Prospero explains his harsh treatment of Caliban by claiming that after initially befriending him, Caliban attempted to rape Miranda. Caliban confirms this gleefully, saying that if he had not been stopped, he would have peopled the island with a race of Calibans – "Thou didst prevent me, I had peopled else this isle with Calibans" (Act I:ii). Prospero then entraps Caliban and torments him with harmful magic if Caliban does not obey his orders. Resentful of Prospero, Caliban takes Stephano, one of the shipwrecked servants, as a god and as his new master. However, Caliban learns that Stephano is neither a god nor Prospero's equal by the conclusion of the play, and he agrees to obey Prospero again.

Be not afeard; the isle is full of noises
Sounds, and sweet airs, that give delight and hurt not.
Sometimes a thousand twangling instruments
Will hum about mine ears; and sometime voices
That, if I then had waked after long sleep,
Will make me sleep again; and then in dreaming,
The clouds me thought would open, and show riches
Ready to drop upon me, that when I waked
I cried to dream again.

– Caliban's monologue to Stephano and Trinunculo, Act III Scene II

== Name ==
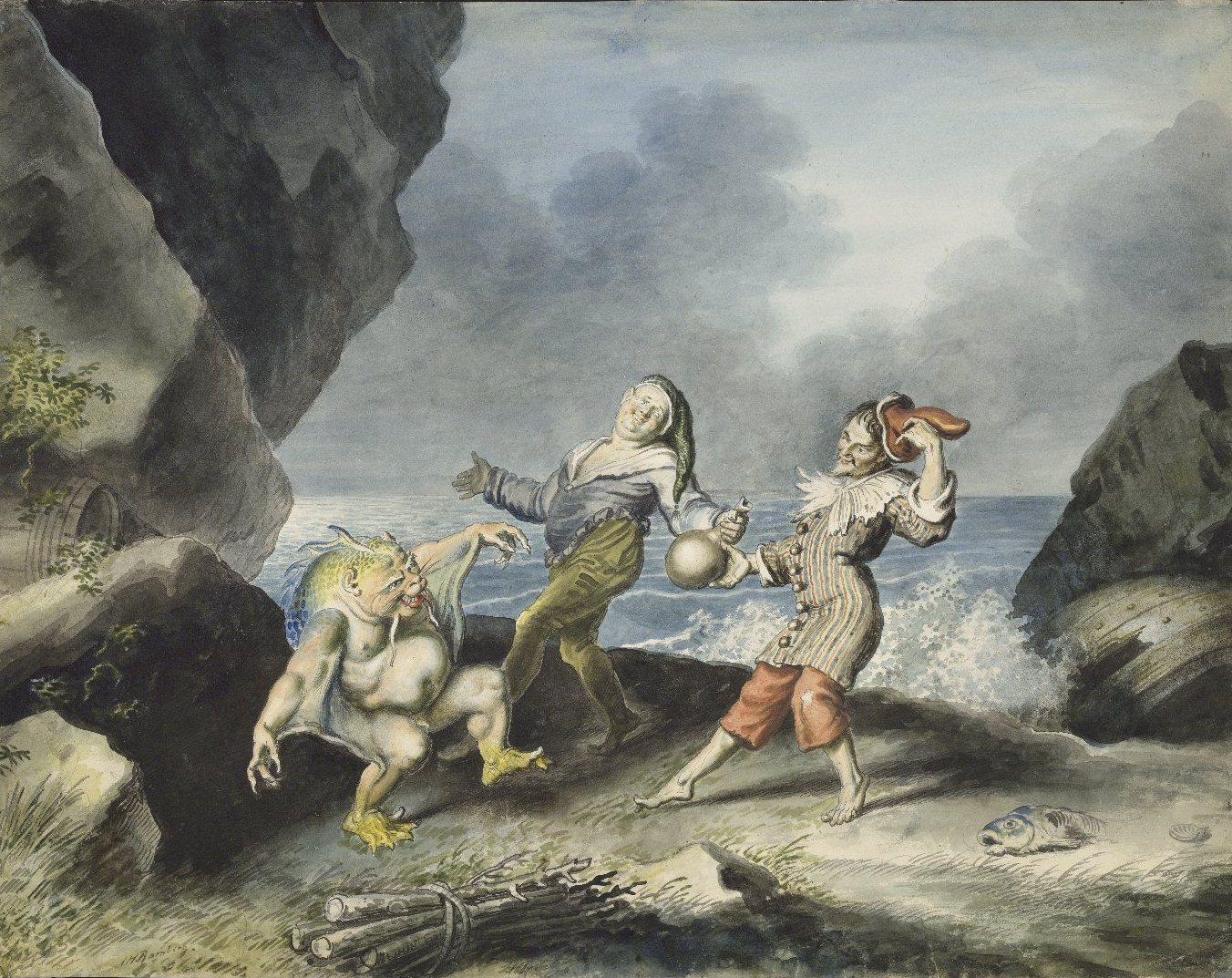
Caliban, Stephano and Trinculo dancing

There is a history of speculation on the name's origin or derivation.

One of the most prominent suggestions concerns Caliban being an anagram of the Spanish word caníbal (Carib people), the source of cannibal in English. The character may be seen as a satire on "Noble cannibal" from Montaigne's Essays (A.30, "Of Cannibals").

Also popular has been comparison to kaliban or cauliban in the Romani language, meaning black or with blackness. The first Romanichal had arrived in England a century before Shakespeare's time.

Since 1889, it has been suggested that Shakespeare may have named Caliban after the Tunisian city Calibia (now called Kelibia) that is seen on maps of the Mediterranean dating to 1529.

Many other, though less notable, suggestions have been made, primarily in the 19th century, including an Arabic word for "vile dog", a Hindu Kalee-ban "satyr of Kalee, the Hindu Proserpine", German Kabeljau ("codfish"), etc.

== See also ==
- Arielismo
