= Laurelle Richards =

Saint Martinois poet and folklorist

Laurelle "Yaya" Richards (April 28, 1955 – May 26, 2010) was a poet and folklorist on Saint Martin. She was known for her leadership of cultural organizations on the island and for her recitations of her poetry, written in Saint Martin English, which was collected and published shortly after her death as The Frock & Other Poems.

== Early life and career ==
Laurelle Richards, known as "Yaya" or "Red Bird," was born in Anguilla on April 28, 1955. Her parents were Elvira Bryan, a domestic worker, and Albert Richards, a construction contractor, and she was the eldest of their nine children. She grew up in the village of Freetown in Saint Martin, which sits outside Saint Louis to the north of the French collectivity's capital, Marigot. She has been described as the village's "most well-known resident and matriarch."

She attended the Marigot Girls School, learning sewing and other skills, but dropped out in 1971 at age 16 to earn money for her family. Her various jobs throughout her life included as a waitress, taxi driver, maid, and seamstress. She became well known as an independent taxi driver, driving her cab until her death.

Richards was recognized as a leading folklorist on Saint Martin, promoting griot storytelling. She wrote and recited her own poetry, primarily in Saint Martin English. Her writing is grounded in Saint Martin's history and culture.

In 2002, she held a series of verse recitations of her poem "The Frock," in honor of International Mother Language Day. For the performances, she wore a multicolored gown that helped illustrate her narrative. Other performances included participation in local productions of The Vagina Monologues in 2007 and 2008.

As a promoter of Saint Martin cultural heritage, in 1990, Richards established the Cultural Women Association of Rambaud-Saint Louis, which she led as the organization's longtime president. In 2006, she served as a founding member and chair of the Rambaud St-Louis Fête Association, a cultural organization.

== Personal life, death, and legacy ==
Richards had five children before she was widowed at age 33.

In 2010, she died suddenly at age 55, at Great Bay in Sint Maarten. On her death, local media described her as "one of the nation’s beloved cultural mothers."

A collection of her poetry, compiled shortly before her death, was published posthumously in 2010 by House of Nehesi Publishers under the title The Frock & Other Poems. A portrait of Richards by Roland Richardson was hung in the Tourist Office in 2015 in Marigot. In 2022, she was posthumously honored with a Sage Cultural Award by the Government of Sint Maarten.
