= Jane King (poet) =

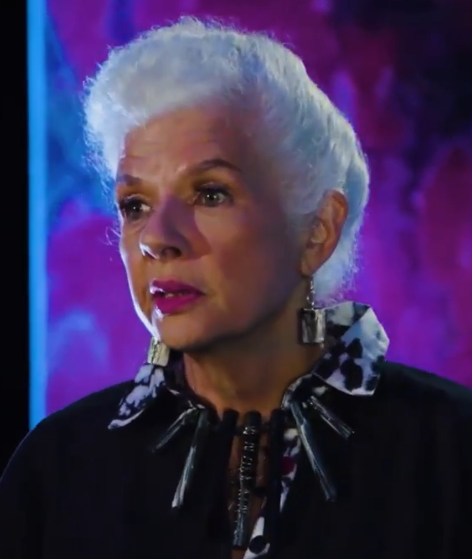
Hippolyte in 2020

Jane King (born 1952) is a St. Lucian poet, a leading West Indian writer of the generation born after World War II.

== Biography ==
Jane King was born in Castries but had a peripatetic childhood, as her family spent time in Trinidad and Tobago, Barbados, and Scotland during her early years. After St Joseph's Convent in St Lucia, she won a St Lucia island scholarship to study at the University of Edinburgh. Since 1976 she has taught in various institutions, including the Sir Arthur Lewis Community College in Castries, where she also served as the Dean of their Division of Arts and General Studies.

King has published three collections of poems: Into the Centre (1993), Fellow Traveller (1994) and Performance Anxiety (2013).Commonwealth Writers Prize, Caribbean and Canada, and James Rodway Memorial Prize). Her poems are known for the wry wit with which they address the place of a light-skinned narrator in a race-conscious Caribbean as well as concerns over the role of the creative imagination in Caribbean societies.

She is also an actor and theatre director, co-founder of St Lucia's Lighthouse Theatre Company.

She is married to poet Kendel Hippolyte.
