= Saint Mary's College (Saint Lucia) =

Catholic secondary school in Castries, Saint Lucia

- The school's crest

Location
- Vigie, Castries; Saint Lucia
- Coordinates: 14°01′24.96″N 60°59′57.48″W

Information
- Other name: SMC
- School type: Secondary School
- Motto: Summum Attingitur Nitendo (The top is reached by striving)
- Established: 20 April 1890
- Authority: Ministry of Education
- Principal: Neal Fontenelle
- Grades: Form 1 - Form 5 (5 Years)
- Gender: Male
- Age range: 11-16
- Houses: Presentation, Rodney, Tapon, Abercrombie
- Colours: Black and White
- Website: smc.edu.lc

Saint Mary's College is an all-male secondary school located in Vigie, Castries, Saint Lucia.

== History ==
Saint Mary's College opened on 20 April 1890, founded by Rev. Louis Tapon as the first secondary school in Saint Lucia.

In 2022 there was a legal case after the head sent a student home because he had a full head of hair. Judge Kimberly Cenac-Phulgence granted an injunction obliging the school to admit the student while the dispute was settled.

== Notable alumni ==
- John Compton, 1st prime minister of Saint Lucia
- Derek Walcott, poet, dramatist and winner of the Nobel Prize for Literature
- Arthur Lewis, economist and winner of the Nobel Prize for Economics
- Philip J. Pierre, 8th prime minister of Saint Lucia
- Dunstan St. Omer, painter, muralist and designer of the national flag
- Emile Ford, singer
- Hunter J. Francois, lawyer and politician
- Vladimir Lucien, writer, critic and actor
