= Frank Hugh Foster =

American theologian

Frank Hugh Foster, Ph. D., D.D. (June 19, 1851 – October 20, 1935) was an American clergyman of the Congregational church. He was born in Springfield, Massachusetts, and graduated at Harvard in 1873.

In his activities, he was assistant professor of mathematics in the United States Naval Academy, graduated at Andover Theological Seminary (1877), served as pastor at North Reading, Massachusetts, studied at Göttingen and Leipzig (1879–1882), and from 1882 to 1884 was professor of philosophy in Middlebury College. In 1884 he was appointed professor of Church history in the Oberlin Theological Seminary; from 1892 to 1902, he served at Berkeley, California in the Pacific Seminary; and in 1904 he went to Olivet, Michigan as pastor of the college and the village church.

He was an editor of the Bibliotheca Sacra; translated Grotius' Defense (1889); and wrote Christian Life and Theology (1900), and A Genetic History of the New England Theology (on the New England Theology).
