= Institute of Children's Literature =

Higher education institute in Connecticut, USA

Coordinates: 41.3329°N 73.4442°W

- Established: 1969
- Mission: Creative writing, Children's literature
- Owner: WriteWell
- Address: 193 Long Ridge Road
- Location: Danbury, Connecticut, United States
- Website: writingforchildren.com

The Institute of Children's Literature is an institute founded in 1969 that offers courses for writing and marketing children's literature.

The institute's campus and administrative building is located in the Long Ridge section of Danbury, Connecticut, near the border with West Redding. Although the school has long associated itself with West Redding in advertising and public materials, its courses are offered remotely. The institute offers courses that can be used for college credit through Charter Oak State College's Connecticut Credit Assessment Program.

The Institute's instruction is strictly by correspondence. Each student is assigned to a professional instructor, who reads and critiques each writing assignment. Students learn by completing assignments of their choice in fiction and non-fiction genres. Editors have wide experience as published writers in the children's market. The written critiques are customized for the student's particular work and are not just form letters or "how to" replies.

The institute also includes some training in how to market manuscripts. The Institute of Children's Literature does not market manuscripts or represent the writer to any publisher or literary agent.

== See also ==
- Category:Institute of Children's Literature people
