= Kamau Brathwaite =

Barbadian poet and academic (1930–2020)

The Honourable Kamau Brathwaite CHB
- Born: Lawson Edward Brathwaite; 11 May 1930; Bridgetown, Colony of Barbados, British Empire
- Died: 4 February 2020 (aged 89); Barbados
- Education: Harrison College; Pembroke College, Cambridge (BA); University of Sussex (PhD)
- Occupations: Poet, academic
- Spouses: Doris Monica Wellcome (m. 1960; died 1986) Beverley Reid (m. 1998)
- Relatives: Joan Brathwaite
- Writing career
- Pen name: Edward Brathwaite; Edward Kamau Brathwaite
- Notable work: Rights of Passage (1967)
- Movement: Caribbean Artists Movement

Edward Kamau Brathwaite CHB (/kəˈmaʊ ˈbræθweɪt/; 11 May 1930 – 4 February 2020), was a Barbadian poet and academic, widely considered one of the major voices in the Caribbean literary canon. Formerly a professor of Comparative Literature at New York University, Brathwaite was the 2006 International Winner of the Griffin Poetry Prize, for his volume of poetry Born to Slow Horses.

Brathwaite held a doctorate degree from the University of Sussex (1968) and was the co-founder of the Caribbean Artists Movement (CAM). He received both the Guggenheim and Fulbright Fellowships in 1983, and was a winner of the 1994 Neustadt International Prize for Literature, the Bussa Award, the Casa de las Américas Prize for poetry, and the 1999 Charity Randall Citation for Performance and Written Poetry from the International Poetry Forum.

Brathwaite was noted for his studies of Black cultural life both in Africa and throughout the African diasporas of the world in works such as Folk Culture of the Slaves in Jamaica (1970); The Development of Creole Society in Jamaica, 1770–1820 (1971); Contradictory Omens (1974); Afternoon of the Status Crow (1982); and History of the Voice (1984), the publication of which established him as the authority of note on nation language.

Brathwaite often made use of a combination of customized typefaces (some resembling dot matrix printing) and spelling, referred to as Sycorax video style.

== Biography ==
=== Early life and education ===
Lawson Edward Brathwaite was born in the capital city of Bridgetown, Barbados, to Hilton and Beryl (Gill) Brathwaite. He began his secondary education in 1945 at Harrison College in Bridgetown, and while there wrote essays on jazz for a school newspaper that he started, as well as contributing articles to the literary magazine Bim. In 1949 he won the Barbados Island Scholarship to attend the University of Cambridge, where he studied English and History. In 1953, Brathwaite received a B.A. honours degree in history from Pembroke College, Cambridge, and he also began his association with the BBC's Caribbean Voices programme in London, where many of his poems and stories were broadcast. In 1954 he received a Diploma of Education from Cambridge.

=== The years in Ghana ===
The year 1955 found Brathwaite working as an education officer in the Gold Coast with the Ministry of Education. This saw him "witness Kwame Nkrumah coming to power and Ghana becoming the first African state to gain independence, which profoundly affected his sense of Caribbean culture and identity", and Brathwaite was also able to study with the musicologist J. H. Kwabena Nketia.

In 1960, while on home leave from Ghana, Brathwaite married Doris Monica Wellcome, a Guyanese graduate in Home Economics and Tropical Nutrition from the University of Leicester, with whom he had a son, Michael.

Brathwaite's writing flowered during his years in Ghana, with Odale's Choice (a play) premiering at the Mfantsiman Secondary School in Cape Coast, in June 1962. A full production of the play was later taken to Accra.

=== Return to the Caribbean and the UK ===
In 1962–63, Brathwaite crossed the waters again and found himself as resident tutor in the Department of Extra-Mural Studies in St Lucia. Later in 1963, he made his journey to the University of the West Indies (UWI), Mona Campus in Kingston, Jamaica, to teach in the history department.

In 1966, he spearheaded, as co-founder and secretary, the organization of the Caribbean Artists Movement (CAM) from London, other key figures involved being John La Rose and Andrew Salkey.

In 1971, Brathwaite launched Savacou, a journal of CAM, at the University of the West Indies (UWI), Mona Campus in Kingston, Jamaica. That same year, he received the name Kamau from Ngugi wa Thiong'o's grandmother at Limuru, Kenya, while on a City of Nairobi Fellowship to the University of Nairobi.

His doctoral thesis from Sussex University on The Development of Creole Society in Jamaica was published in 1971 by Oxford University Press, and in 1973 he published what is generally considered his best work, The Arrivants: A New World Trilogy, comprising three earlier volumes: Rights of Passage (1967), Masks (1968) and Islands (1969). An exhaustive bibliography of his work, entitled EKB: His Published Prose & Poetry, 1948–1986 was produced by his wife, Doris Monica Brathwaite, in 1986. In response to her death later that year, Brathwaite wrote The Zea Mexican Diary: 7 September 1926 – 7 September 1986.

Brathwaite described the years from 1986 to 1990 as a "time of salt", in which he chronicled the death of his wife in 1986, the destruction of his archive in Irish Town, Jamaica, by Hurricane Gilbert in 1988, and his near-death experience as a result of a Kingston shooting in 1990.

=== "Maroon years" and afterwards ===
Kamau Brathwaite spent three self-financed "Maroon Years", 1997 to 2000, at "Cow Pasture", his now famous and, then, "post-hurricane" home in Barbados. In 1998, he married Beverly Reid, a Jamaican.

In 1992, Brathwaite took up the position of Professor of Comparative Literature at New York University, subsequently dividing his residence between Barbados and New York.

In 1994, he was awarded the Neustadt International Prize for Literature for his body of work, nominated by Ghanaian poet and author Kofi Awoonor, edging out other nominees including; Toni Morrison, Norman Mailer, and Chinua Achebe.

In 2002 the University of Sussex presented Kamau Brathwaite with an honorary doctorate.

In 2004, after his retirement from New York University, Brathwaite began chronicling a Second Time of Salt, musing on what he deemed a "cultural lynching."

In 2006, he was the sole person that year to be awarded a Musgrave gold medal by the Institute of Jamaica, with eight silver and bronze medals going to other recipients. In 2010, Brathwaite reported the theft of the medal, as well as other items from his New York City home in the previous four years.

Brathwaite was Professor Emeritus of Comparative Literature at New York University and resided in Cow Pasture, Barbados.

He died aged 89 on 4 February 2020, and was accorded an official funeral on 21 February.

== Posthumous recognition and legacy ==
Shortly before his death, Brathwaite was offered and had accepted the Bocas Henry Swanzy Award for Distinguished Service to Caribbean Letters, presented annually at the NGC Bocas Lit Fest. Announcing that the award, which recognises his contribution as a literary critic, literary activist, editor, and author on topics of Caribbean literature, as well as honouring the year of his 90th birthday, would be presented to his family in Barbados at a ceremony March, Bocas founder and director Marina Salandy-Brown said: "It now seems even more significant to honour him and, in this time of mourning, it is a small consolation to know that news of the award brought Prof Brathwaite pleasure in his final days."

On 22 October 2020, a commissioned portrait of Brathwaite, painted by Errol Lloyd, was unveiled at his alma mater Pembroke College, Cambridge.

== Honours and awards ==
- 1970: Cholmondeley Award
- 1983: Guggenheim Fellowship
- 1983: Fulbright Fellowship
- 1987: Order of Barbados (CHB)
- 1994: Neustadt International Prize for Literature
- 1999: Charity Randall Citation for Performance and Written Poetry from International Poetry Forum
- 2002: Honorary doctorate, University of Sussex
- 2006: Griffin Poetry Prize, International Winner
- 2006: Gold Musgrave Medal for Literature from the Institute of Jamaica
- 2007: President's Award, St. Martin Book Fair
- 2010: W. E. B. Du Bois Award
- 2011: Casa de las Americas Premio
- 2015: Robert Frost Medal from Poetry Society of America
- 2016: Elected an Honorary Fellow of Pembroke College, Cambridge
- 2018: PEN/Voelcker Award for Poetry
- 2020: Bocas Henry Swanzy Award for Distinguished Service to Caribbean Letters

== Selected works ==
- Four Plays for Primary Schools (1964)
- Odale's Choice (1967)
- Rights of Passage (1967)
- Masks (1968)
- Islands (1969)
- Folk Culture of the Slaves in Jamaica (1970)
- The Development of Creole Society in Jamaica, 1770–1820 (1971)
- The Arrivants: A New World Trilogy (Rights of Passage; Islands; Masks) (1973)
- Contradictory Omens: Cultural Diversity and Integration in the Caribbean (1974)
- Other Exiles (1975) ISBN 9780192118554, OCLC 1941894
- Days & Nights (Caldwell, 1975)
- Black + Blues (1976) ISBN 9780811213134, OCLC 638843322
- Mother Poem (1977)
- Soweto (1979)
- History of the Voice (1979)
- Jamaica Poetry (1979)
- Barbados Poetry (1979)
- Sun Poem (1982)
- Afternoon of the Status Crow (1982)
- Gods of the Middle Passage (1982)
- Third World Poems (1983)
- History of the Voice: The Development of Nation Language in Anglophone Caribbean Poetry (1984)
- Jah Music (1986)
- X/Self (1987)
- Sappho Sakyi's Meditations (1989)
- Shar (1992)
- Middle Passages (1992)
- The Zea Mexican Diary: 7 September 1926 – 7 September 1986 1993. ISBN 9780299136406, OCLC 27936656
- Trench Town Rock (1994) ISBN 0918786452
- Barabajan Poems (1994)
- DreamStories (1994)
- Dream Haiti (Savacou North, 1995)
- Words Need Love Too (2000)
- Ancestors (New Directions, 2001). ISBN 9780811214483, OCLC 44426964
- Magical Realism (2002)
- Golokwati (2002)
- Born to Slow Horses (2006), Middletown, Conn.: Wesleyan University Press. ISBN 9780819567451, OCLC 552147442 (winner of the 2006 International Griffin Poetry Prize)
- Limbo. As published in Oxford AQA GCSE English Anthology, 2005 and 2008
- Elegguas. Wesleyan University Press. 15 October 2010. ISBN 978-0-8195-6943-1. OCLC 436358418.
- Strange Fruit (Peepal Tree Press, 2016). ISBN 9781845233082, OCLC 999357248
- Liviticus (2017), House of Nehesi Publishers.
- The Lazarus Poems (2017). ISBN 9780819576880, OCLC 984512184

=== Translations ===
- [Fr] Kamau Brathwaite, Le détonateur de visibilite / The Visibility Trigger, traduction par Maria-Francesca Mollica et Christine Pagnoulle, Louvain: Cahiers de Louvain, 1986.
- [Es] Kamau Brathwaite, Los danzantes del tiempo: antología poética, selección, introducción y entrevista, Christopher Winks; versión en español Adriana González Mateos y Christopher Winks, México: Universidad Autónoma de la Ciudad de México, 2009.
- [Es] Kamau Brathwaite, La unidad submarina: ensayos caribeños, Selección, estudio preliminar y entrevista de Florencia Bonfiglio, Buenos Aires: Katatay, 2010.
- [It] Kamau Brathwaite, "Retamar", "Word-Making Man", "The New Year Midnight Poems", "Nest", "Calabash", "Song", cura e traduzione di Andrea Gazzoni, La Rivista dell'Arte, 2:2 (2012), 168–212.1
- [Fr] Kamau Brathwaite, RêvHaïti, traduction par Christine Pagnoulle, Montréal: Mémoire d'Encrier, 2013.
- [It] Kamau Brathwaite, Diritti di passaggio, cura e traduzione di Andrea Gazzoni, Rome: Ensemble Edizioni, 2014.
- [It] Kamau Brathwaite, "Missile e capsula", in Andrea Gazzoni, Pensiero caraibico: Kamau Brathwaite, Alejo Carpentier, Édouard Glissant, Derek Walcott, Rome: Ensemble Edizioni, 2016.

== Critical writing about Brathwaite ==
- Emily Allen Williams, The Critical Response to Kamau Brathwaite. Praeger, 2004.
- Timothy J. Reiss. For The Geography of A Soul: Emerging Perspectives on Kamau Brathwaite. Africa World Press, 2002.
- Kelly Baker Josephs, "Versions of X/Self: Kamau Brathwaite's Caribbean Discourse", Anthurium: A Caribbean Studies Journal, 1.1 (Fall 2003).
- June Bobb, Beating a Restless Drum: The Poetics of Kamau Brathwaite and Derek Walcott. Trenton, NJ: Africa World Press, 1997.
- ed. Stewart Brown. The Art of Kamau Brathwaite (Seren, 1995, ISBN 9781854110923).
- Loretta Collins, "From the 'Crossroads of Space' to the (dis)Koumforts of Home: Radio and the Poet as Transmuter of the Word in Kamau Brathwaite's 'Meridian' and Ancestors", Anthurium, 1.1 (Fall 2003).
- Raphael Dalleo, "Another 'Our America': Rooting a Caribbean Aesthetic in the Work of José Martí, Kamau Brathwaite and Édouard Glissant", Anthurium, 2.2 (Fall 2004).
- Montague Kobbe, "Caribbean Identity and Nation Language in Kamau Brathwaite", Latineos, 23 December 2010. Retrieved 18 October 2012.
- Melanie Otto, A Creole Experiment: Utopian Space in Kamau Brathwaite's "Video-Style" Works. Trenton, NJ: Africa World Press, 2009.
- Anna Reckin, "Tidalectic Lectures: Kamau Brathwaite's Prose/Poetry as Sound-Space", Anthurium, 1.1 (Fall 2003).
- Andrew Rippeon, "Bebop, Broadcast, Podcast, Audioglyph: Scanning Kamau Brathwaite's Mediated Sounds", Contemporary Literature, 55.2 (Summer 2014).

=== See also ===
- Caribbean literature
- Caribbean poetry
- Nation language
- Postcolonial literature
