= The Tempest in music, literature and art =

William Shakespeare's play The Tempest has influenced music, literature and art in varied ways in the 400 years since it was written.

== Music ==
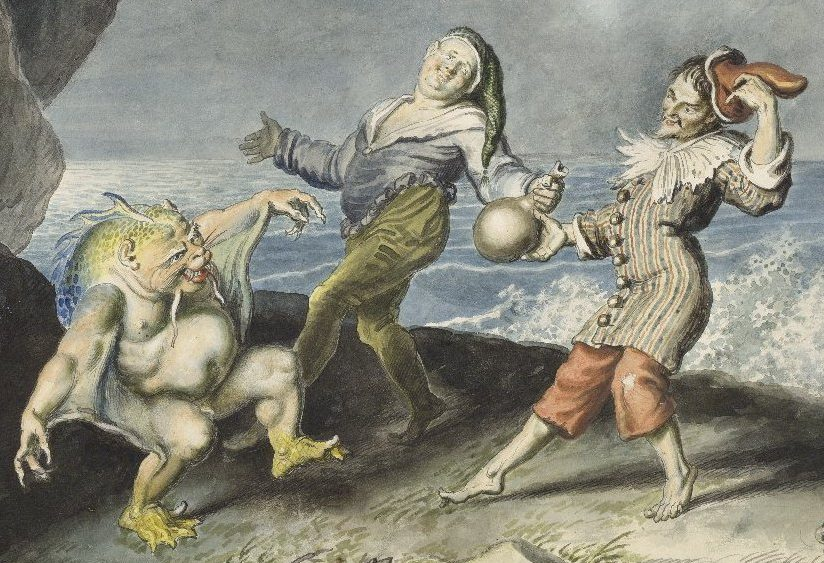
Caliban, Stephano and Trinculo dancing, detail of a painting by Johann Heinrich Ramberg

The Tempest has more music than any other Shakespeare play, and has proved more popular as a subject for composers than most of Shakespeare's plays. Scholar Julie Sanders ascribes this to the "perceived 'musicality' or lyricism" of the play.

Two settings of songs from The Tempest which may have been used in performances during Shakespeare's lifetime have survived. These are "Full Fathom Five" and "Where The Bee Sucks There Suck I" in the 1659 publication Cheerful Ayres or Ballads, in which they are attributed to Robert Johnson, who regularly composed for the King's Men. It has been common throughout the history of the play for the producers to commission contemporary settings of these two songs, and also of "Come Unto These Yellow Sands".

The Tempest has also influenced songs written in the folk and hippie traditions: for example, versions of "Full Fathom Five" were recorded by Marianne Faithfull for Come My Way in 1965 and by Pete Seeger for Dangerous Songs!? in 1966.

Ludwig van Beethoven's 1802 Piano Sonata No. 17 in D minor, Op. 31, No. 2, was given the subtitle "The Tempest" some time after Beethoven's death because, when asked about the meaning of the sonata, Beethoven was alleged to have said "Read The Tempest." But this story comes from his associate Anton Schindler, who is often not trustworthy.

=== Incidental music ===
Among those who wrote incidental music to The Tempest are:

- Arthur Sullivan: his graduation piece, completed in 1861, was a set of incidental music to "The Tempest". His score was still in use half a century later to add atmosphere the Old Vic's 1914 production.
- Ernest Chausson: in 1888 he wrote incidental music for La tempête, a French translation by Maurice Bouchor. This is believed to be the first orchestral work that made use of the celesta.
- Jean Sibelius: his 1926 incidental music was written for a lavish production at the Royal Theatre in Copenhagen. An epilogue was added for a 1927 performance in Helsinki. He represented individual characters through instrumentation choices: particularly admired was his use of harps and percussion to represent Prospero, said to capture the "resonant ambiguity of the character".
- Malcolm Arnold, Lennox Berkeley, Hector Berlioz, Arthur Bliss, Engelbert Humperdinck, Mary McCarty Snow, Willem Pijper, Henry Purcell, and Patsy Rogers.

=== Opera ===
At least forty-six operas or semi-operas based on The Tempest exist. In addition to the Dryden/Davenant and Garrick versions mentioned in the "Restoration and 18th century" section above, Frederic Reynolds produced an operatic version in 1821, with music by Sir Henry Bishop. Other pre-20th-century operas based on The Tempest include Fromental Halévy's La Tempesta (1850) and Zdeněk Fibich's Bouře (1894).

In the 20th century, Kurt Atterberg's Stormen premiered in 1948 and Frank Martin's Der Sturm in 1955. Michael Tippett's 1971 opera The Knot Garden contains various allusions to The Tempest. In Act 3, a psychoanalyst, Mangus, pretends to be Prospero and uses situations from Shakespeare's play in his therapy sessions. John Eaton, in 1985, produced a fusion of live jazz with pre-recorded electronic music, with a libretto by Andrew Porter. Michael Nyman's 1991 opera Noises, Sounds & Sweet Airs was first performed as an opera-ballet choreographed by Karine Saporta. The three vocalists, a soprano, contralto, and tenor, are voices rather than individual characters, with the tenor just as likely as the soprano to sing Miranda, or all three sing as one character.

The soprano who sings the part of Ariel in Thomas Adès's 2004 opera The Tempest is stretched at the higher end of the register, highlighting the androgyny of the role.

Luca Lombardi's Prospero was premiered in April 2006 at Nuremberg Opera House. Ariel is sung by 4 female voices (S,S,MS,A) and has an instrumental alter ego on stage (flute). There is an instrumental alter ego (cello) also for Prospero.

Kaija Saariaho has set six fragments of The Tempest as accompanied arias between 1993 and 2014, and published them as The Tempest Songbook. The work is not intended as a music theatre piece, but it has been staged for instance by Gotham Chamber Opera at the Metropolitan Museum in 2015, in a collage containing also the incidental music for The Tempest attributed to Purcell (Saariaho's work exists in settings for both modern and Baroque instruments).

=== Choral settings ===
Choral settings of excerpts from The Tempest include Amy Beach's Come Unto These Yellow Sands (SSAA, from Three Shakespeare Songs), Matthew Harris's Full Fathom Five, I Shall No More to Sea, and Where the Bee Sucks (SATB, from Shakespeare Songs, Books I, V, VI), Ryan Kelly's The Tempest (SATB, a setting of the play's Scene I), Jaakko Mäntyjärvi's Full Fathom Five and A Scurvy Tune (SATB, from Four Shakespeare Songs and More Shakespeare Songs), Frank Martin's Songs of Ariel (SATB), Ralph Vaughan Williams' Full Fathom Five and The Cloud-capp'd Towers (SATB, from Three Shakespeare Songs), and David Willcocks's Full Fathom Five (SSA).

=== Orchestral works ===
Orchestral works for concert presentation include Pyotr Ilyich Tchaikovsky's fantasy The Tempest (1873), Fibich's symphonic poem Bouře (1880), John Knowles Paine's symphonic poem The Tempest (1876), Benjamin Dale's overture (1902), Arthur Honegger's orchestral prelude (1923), Felix Weingartner's overture "Der Sturm", Heorhiy Maiboroda's overture, and Egon Wellesz's Prosperos Beschwörungen (five works 1934–36).

=== Ballet ===
Ballet sequences have been used in many performances of the play since Restoration times. A one-act ballet of The Tempest by choreographer Alexei Ratmansky was premiered by American Ballet Theatre set to the incidental music of Jean Sibelius on 30 October 2013 in New York City.

=== Stage musicals ===
Stage musicals derived from The Tempest have been produced. A production called The Tempest: A Musical was produced at the Cherry Lane Theatre in New York City in December 2006, with a concept credited to Thomas Meehan and a script by Daniel Neiden (who also wrote the songs) and Ryan Knowles. Neiden had previously been connected with another musical, entitled Tempest Toss'd. In September 2013, The Public Theater produced a new large-scale stage musical at the Delacorte Theater in Central Park, directed by Lear deBessonet with a cast of more than 200.

=== Heavy metal ===
In August 2010, the renowned Brazilian heavy metal music band Angra released the album Aqua, conceptually based on Shakespeare's The Tempest. The album has 10 tracks and tells the journey of Prospero as he passes through the entire work.

According to the band's guitarist and founder, Rafael Bittencourt, the album adopts the element of water as the focus of the most diverse transformations in life, which is represented by Prospero's desires and actions against his enemies:

"Besides all the qualities of the text, we found out that the element 'water' is one of the main characters of the history. It transforms itself during the cycles and changes the things around. It represents the rage of high tides and tempests, and then the forgiveness and wisdom in calm. Everything happens after a violent storm that occurs in the sea, in an island hill. While the wild waters come from up and down, a ship and the entire crew are fighting for surviving. As from this point, we developed one very interesting narrative that will get the attention of the listeners".

== Literature ==
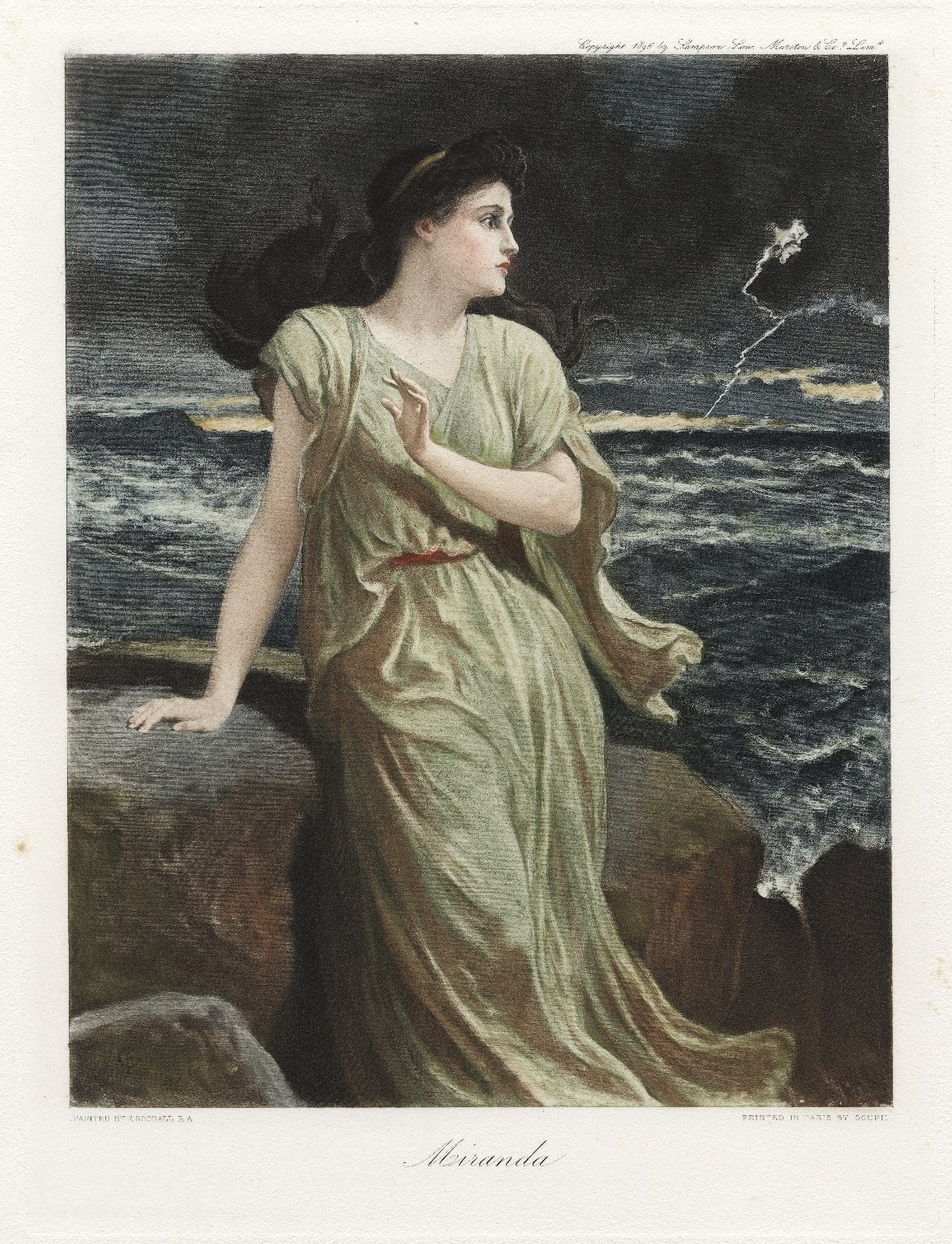
"Miranda" by Frederick Goodall, from the Graphic Gallery of Shakespeare's Heroines

Percy Bysshe Shelley was one of the earliest poets to be influenced by The Tempest. His "With a Guitar, To Jane" identifies Ariel with the poet and his songs with poetry. The poem uses simple diction to convey Ariel's closeness to nature and "imitates the straightforward beauty of Shakespeare's original songs". Following the publication of Darwin's ideas on evolution, writers began to question mankind's place in the world and its relationship with God. One writer who explored these ideas was Robert Browning, whose poem "Caliban upon Setebos" (1864) sets Shakespeare's character pondering theological and philosophical questions. The French philosopher Ernest Renan wrote a closet drama, Caliban: Suite de La Tempête (Caliban: Sequel to The Tempest), in 1878. This features a female Ariel who follows Prospero back to Milan, and a Caliban who leads a coup against Prospero, after the success of which he actively imitates his former master's virtues. W. H. Auden's long poem The Sea and the Mirror is in three parts, Prospero's farewell to Ariel referring to the matters unresolved at the end of the play; a reflection by each of the supporting characters on their experiences and intentions; then a prose narrative "Caliban to the Audience" which takes a Freudian viewpoint, seeing Caliban as Prospero's libidinous secret self.

The book Brave New World by Aldous Huxley references The Tempest in the title, and explores genetically modified citizens and the subsequent social effects. The novel and the phrase from The Tempest, "brave new world", has itself since been associated with public debate about humankind's understanding and use of genetic modification, in particular with regards to humans.

Postcolonial ideas influenced late 20th-century writings. Barbadian George Lamming's 1960 The Pleasures of Exile reflects upon Caliban in the context of the author's feelings of alienation. Aimé Césaire of Martinique, in his 1969 French-language play Une Tempête sets The Tempest in a colony suffering unrest, and prefuiguring black independence. The play portrays Ariel as a mulatto who, unlike the more rebellious black Caliban, feels that negotiation and partnership is the way to freedom from the colonisers. Roberto Fernandez Retamar sets his version of the play in Cuba, and portrays Ariel as a wealthy Cuban (in comparison to the lower-class Caliban) who also must choose between rebellion or negotiation. Barbadian poet E. P. Kamau Brathwaite in his 1969 poem "Caliban" identifies the character with the history of colonialism, between the first voyage of Columbus through to the Cuban Revolution. Jamaican-American author Michelle Cliff's No Telephone to Heaven (which is also a literary response to Jane Eyre) has a protagonist who identifies with both Caliban and Miranda. And the use of Ariel in postcolonial thought is far from uncommon: the spirit is even the namesake of a scholarly journal covering post-colonial criticism. The figure of Caliban influenced numerous works of African literature in the 1970s, including pieces by Taban Lo Liyong in Uganda, Lemuel Johnson in Sierra Leone, Ngũgĩ wa Thiong'o of Kenya's A Grain of Wheat, and David Wallace of Zambia's Do You Love Me, Master? In 1995, Sierra Leonean Lemuel Johnson's Highlife for Caliban imagined Caliban as king of his own kingdom.

A similar phenomenon occurred in relation to feminist ideas in late 20th-century Canada, where several writers produced works inspired by Miranda, including The Diviners by Margaret Laurence, Prospero's Daughter by Constance Beresford-Howe and The Measure of Miranda by Sarah Murphy. Other writers have feminised Ariel (as in Marina Warner's novel Indigo) or Caliban (as in Suniti Namjoshi's sequence of poems Snapshots of Caliban).

As part of Random House's Hogarth Shakespeare series of contemporary reimaginings of Shakespeare plays by contemporary writers, Margaret Atwood's 2016 novel Hag-Seed is based on The Tempest. The 2019 novella Miranda in Milan by Katharine Duckett also reimagines the events which might occur after the end of the play.

== Visual art ==
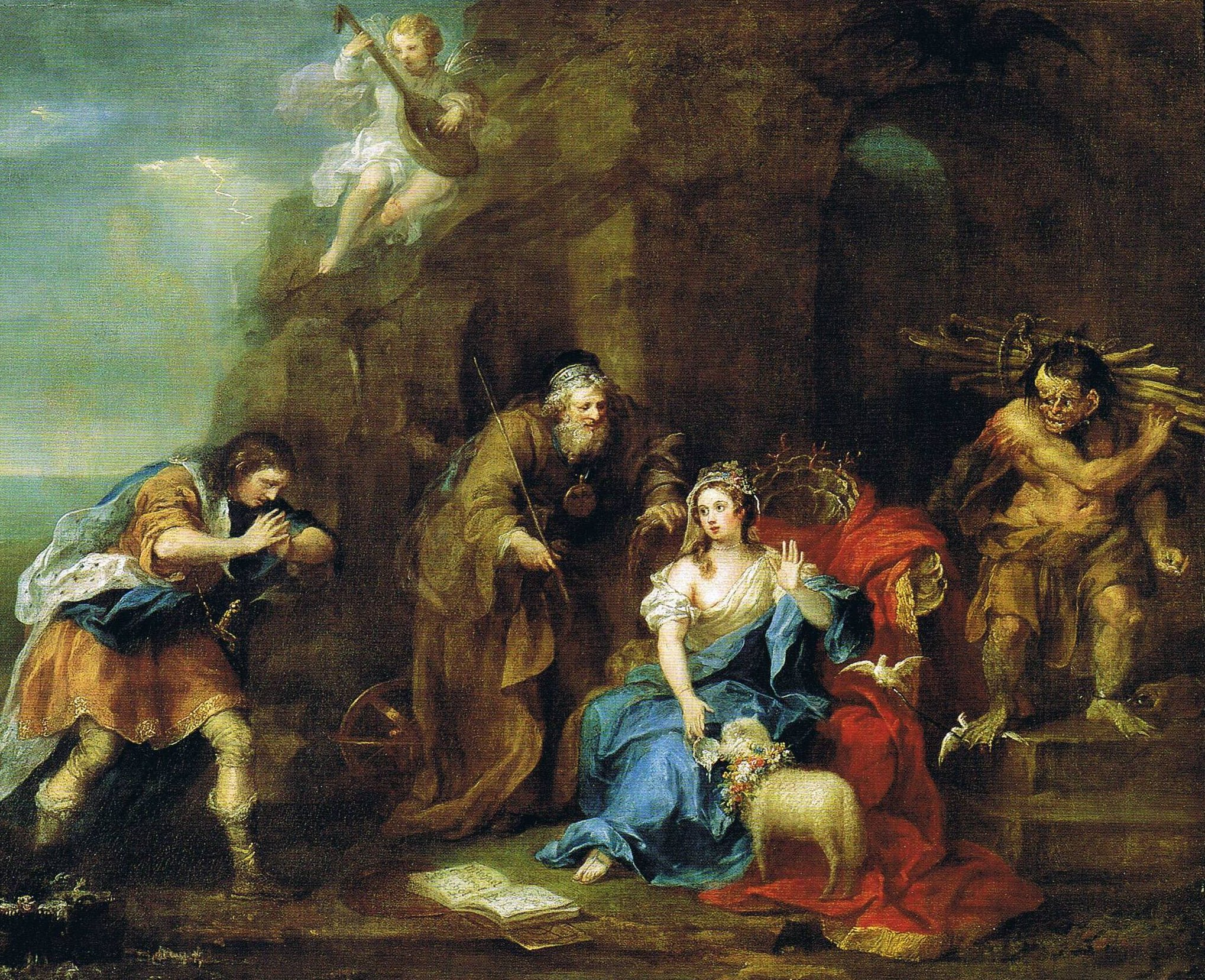
William Hogarth's painting of The Tempest c. 1735.

From the mid-18th century, Shakespeare's plays, including The Tempest, began to appear as the subject of paintings. In around 1735, William Hogarth produced his painting A Scene from The Tempest: "a baroque, sentimental fantasy costumed in the style of Van Dyck and Rembrandt". The painting is based upon Shakespeare's text, containing no representation of the stage, nor of the (Davenant-Dryden centred) stage tradition of the time. Henry Fuseli, in a painting commissioned for the Boydell Shakespeare Gallery (1789) modelled his Prospero on Leonardo da Vinci. These two 18th-century depictions of the play indicate that Prospero was regarded as its moral centre: viewers of Hogarth's and Fuseli's paintings would have accepted Prospero's wisdom and authority. John Everett Millais's Ferdinand Lured by Ariel (1851) is among the Pre-Raphaelite paintings based on the play. In the late 19th century, artists tended to depict Caliban as a Darwinian "missing-link", with fish-like or ape-like features, as evidenced in Joseph Noel Paton's Caliban, and discussed in Daniel Wilson's book Caliban: The Missing Link (1873).

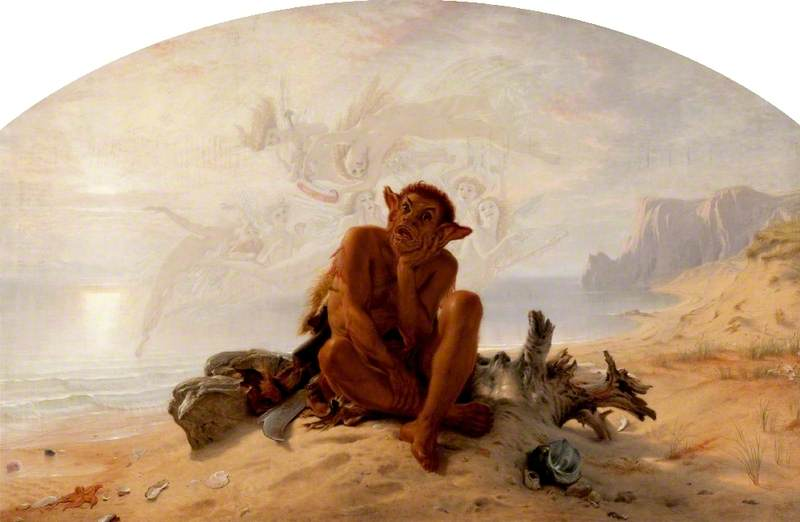
Joseph Noel Paton's Caliban

Charles Knight produced the Pictorial Edition of the Works of Shakespeare in eight volumes (1838–43). The work attempted to translate the contents of the plays into pictorial form. This extended not just to the action, but also to images and metaphors: Gonzalo's line about "mountaineers dewlapped like bulls" is illustrated with a picture of a Swiss peasant with a goitre. In 1908, Edmund Dulac produced an edition of Shakespeare's Comedy of The Tempest with a scholarly plot summary and commentary by Arthur Quiller-Couch, lavishly bound and illustrated with 40 watercolour illustrations. The illustrations highlight the fairy-tale quality of the play, avoiding its dark side. Of the 40, only 12 are direct depictions of the action of the play: the others are based on action before the play begins, or on images such as "full fathom five thy father lies" or "sounds and sweet airs that give delight and hurt not".

In 2015 Charmaine Lurch's installation Revisiting Sycorax gave a physical form to a figure only spoken about in Shakespeare's play, and intended to draw attention to the discrepancy between the presence of African women in the world and the way they are spoken of in European male dialogue.

The Tempest in Art

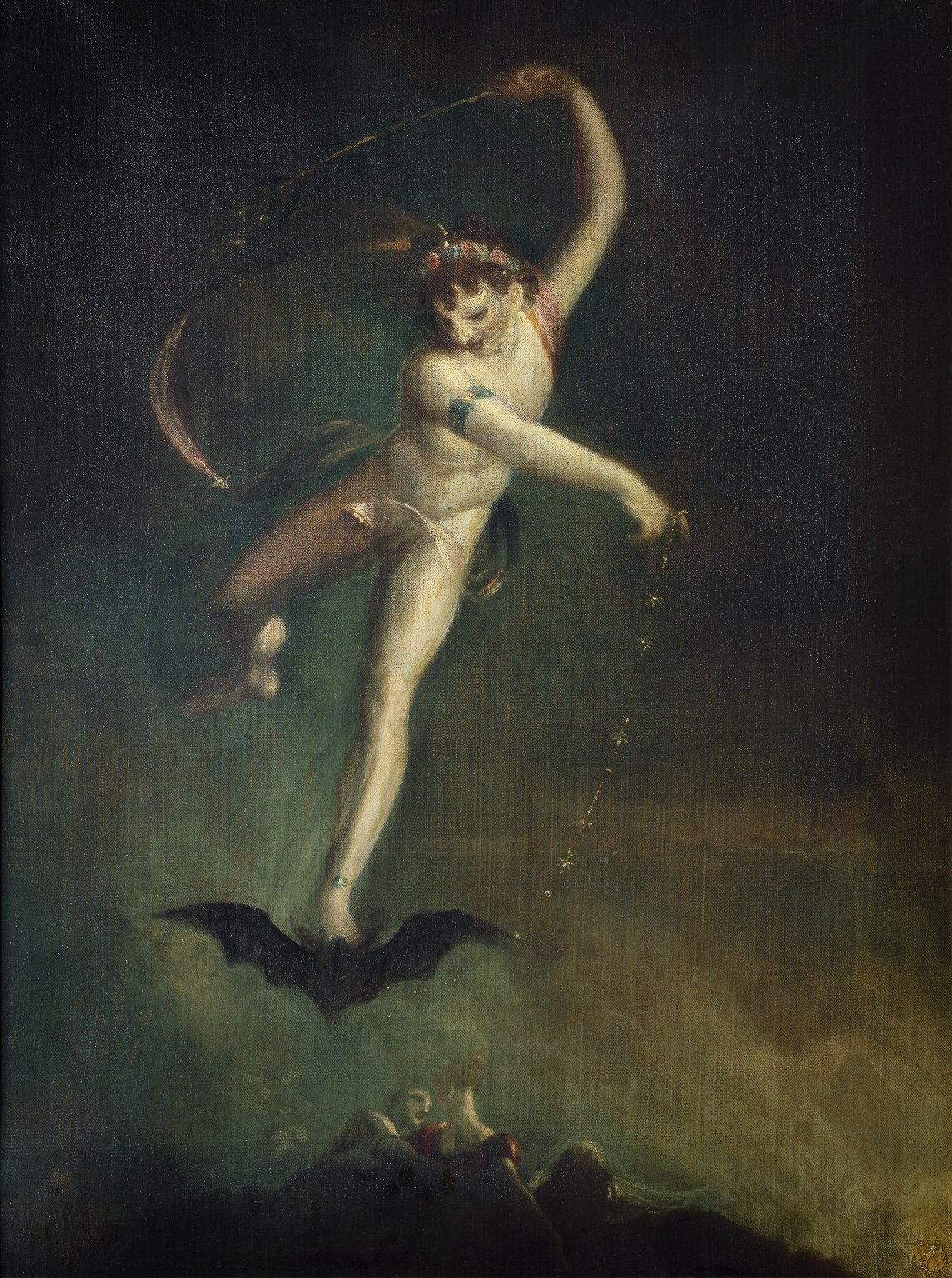
Ariel (Fuseli, c. 1800–1810)

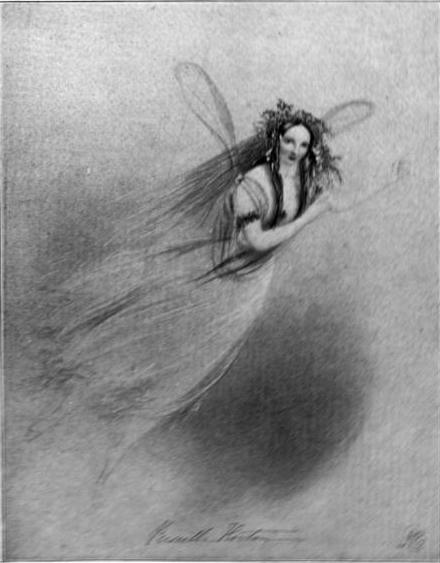
Priscilla Horton as Ariel, 1838

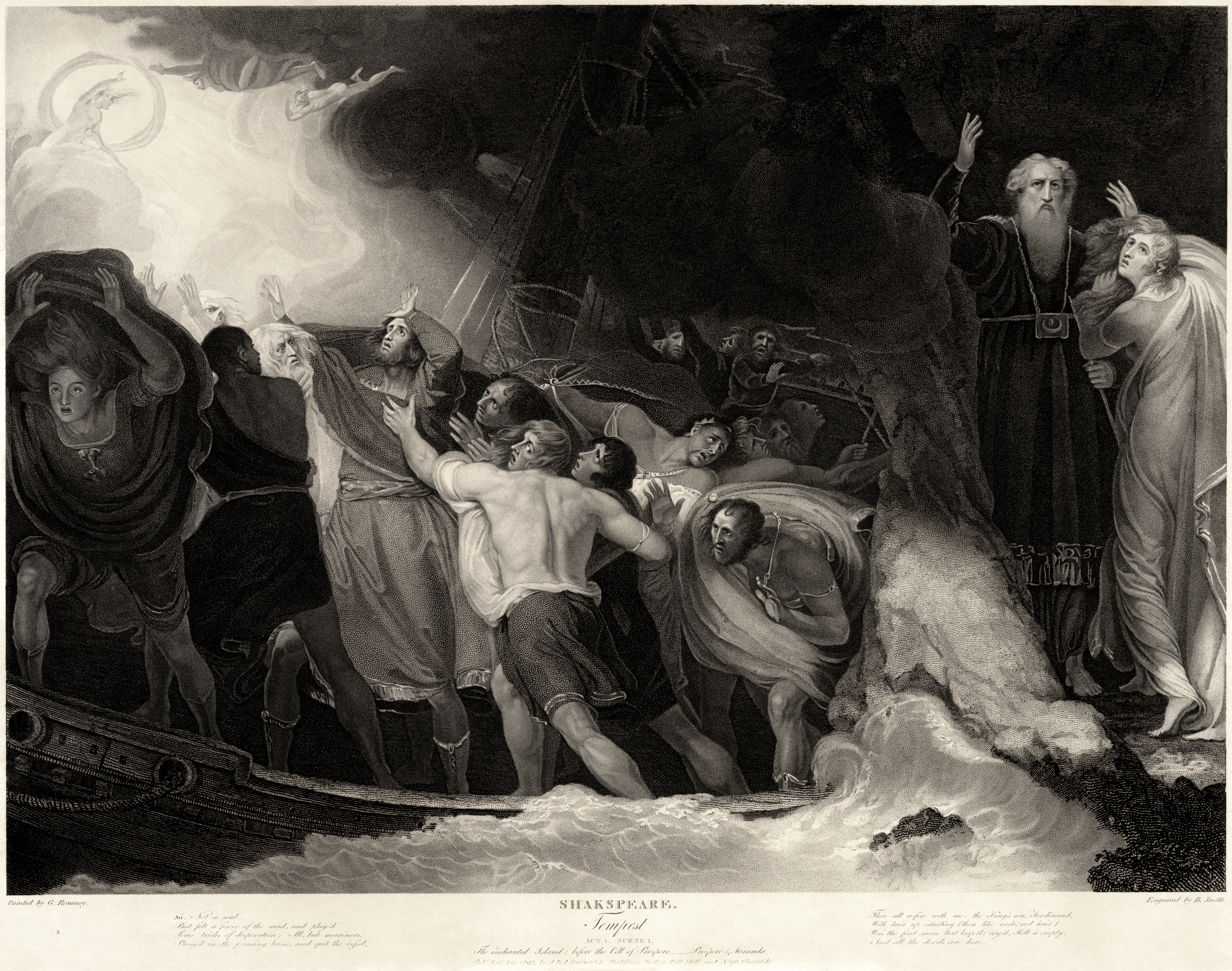
The shipwreck in Act I, Scene 1, in a 1797 engraving by Benjamin Smith after a painting by George Romney

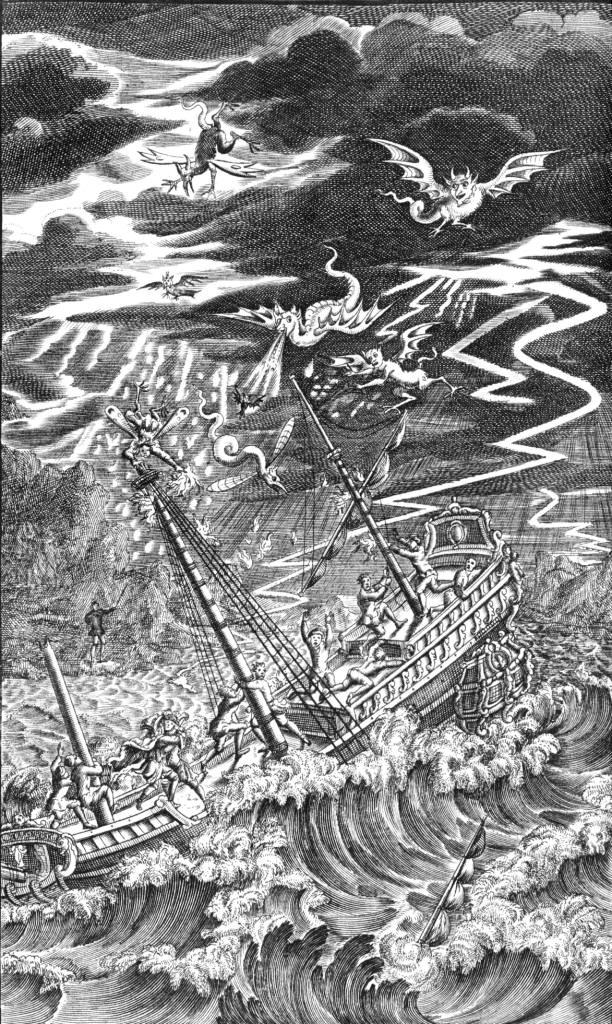
A depiction from Nicholas Rowe's 1709 edition of Shakespeare's plays of the stage direction of the opening of the 1674 adaptation

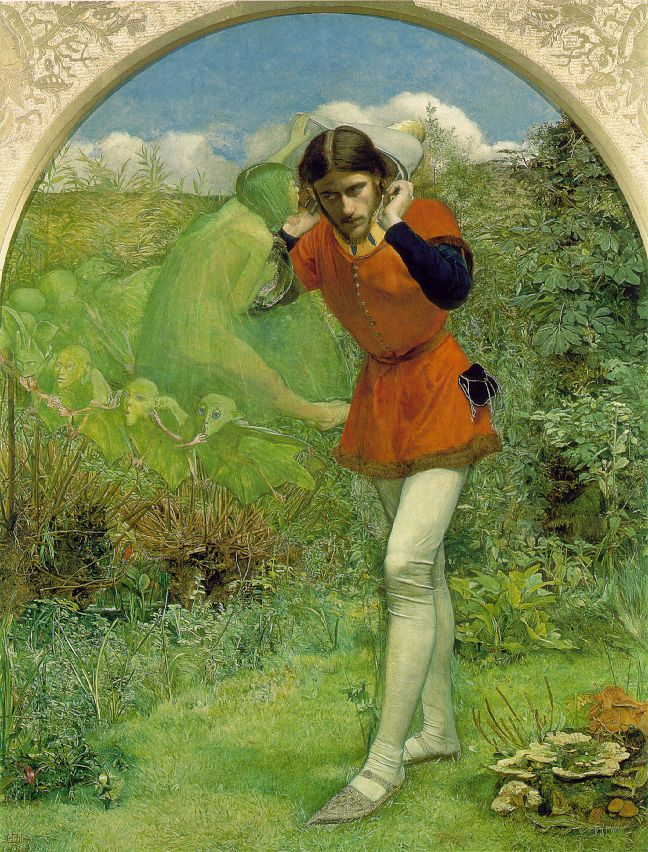
Ferdinand Lured by Ariel by John Everett Millais, 1850

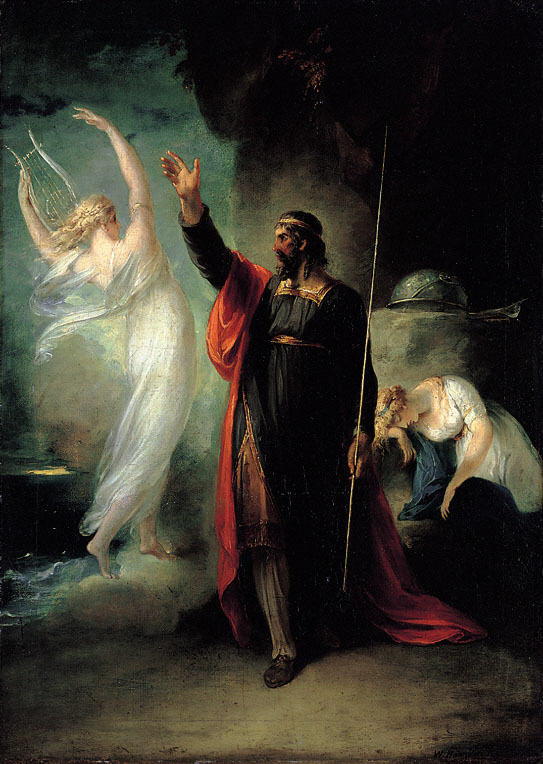
Prospero, Ariel and sleeping Miranda from a painting by William Hamilton

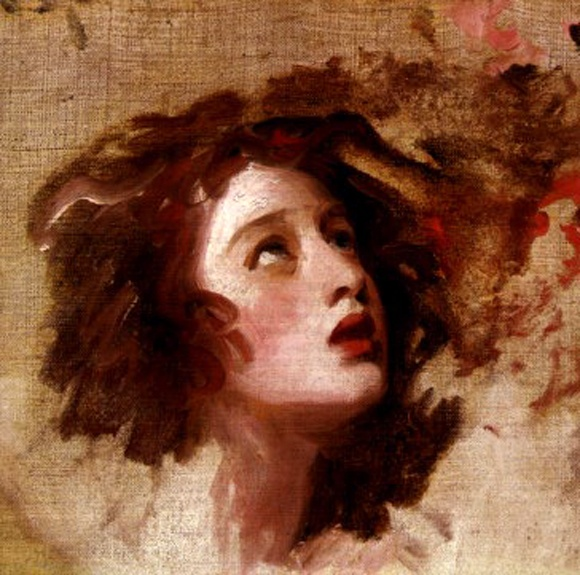
Oil sketch of Emma Hart, as Miranda, by George Romney

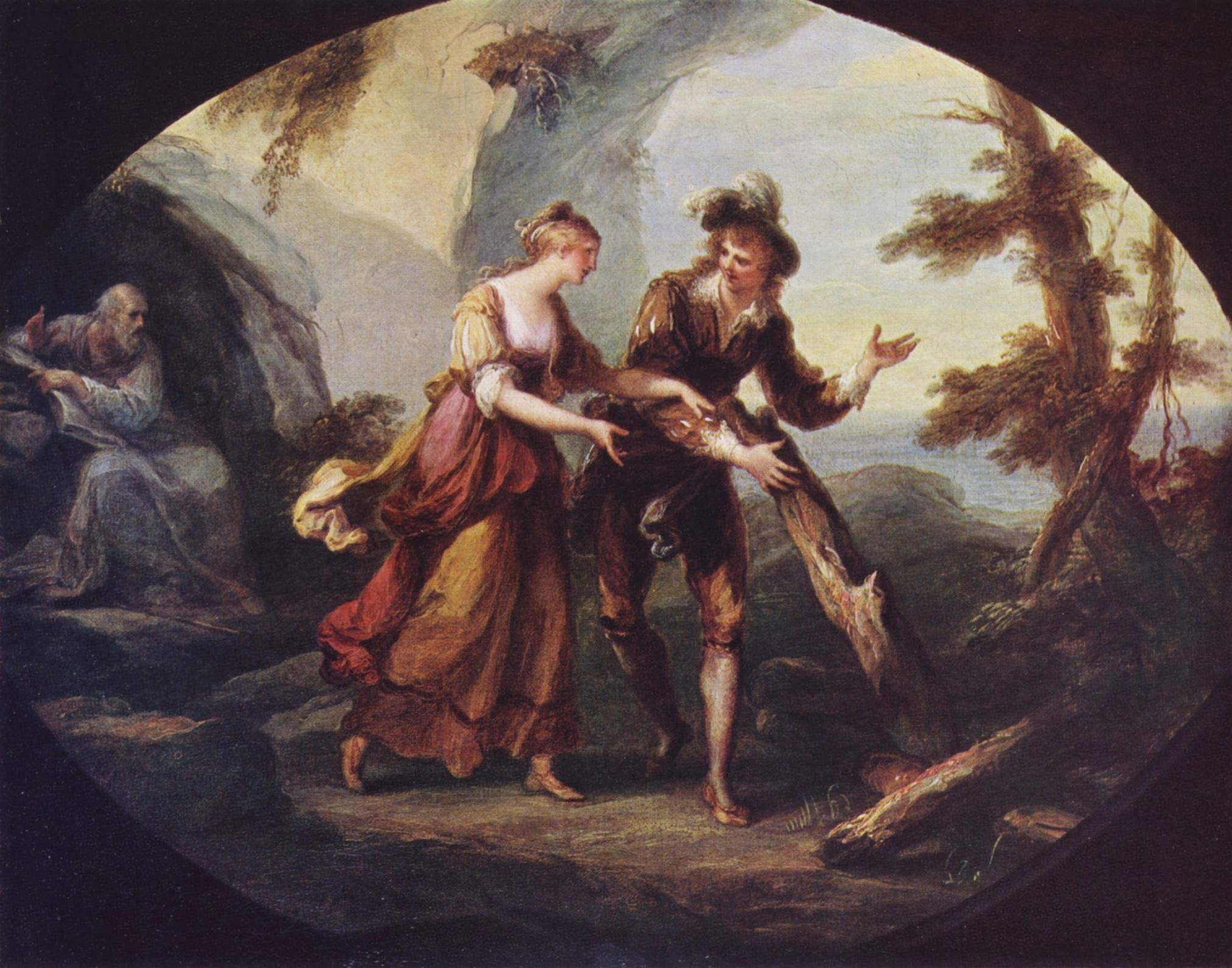
Miranda and Ferdinand by Angelica Kauffman, 1782

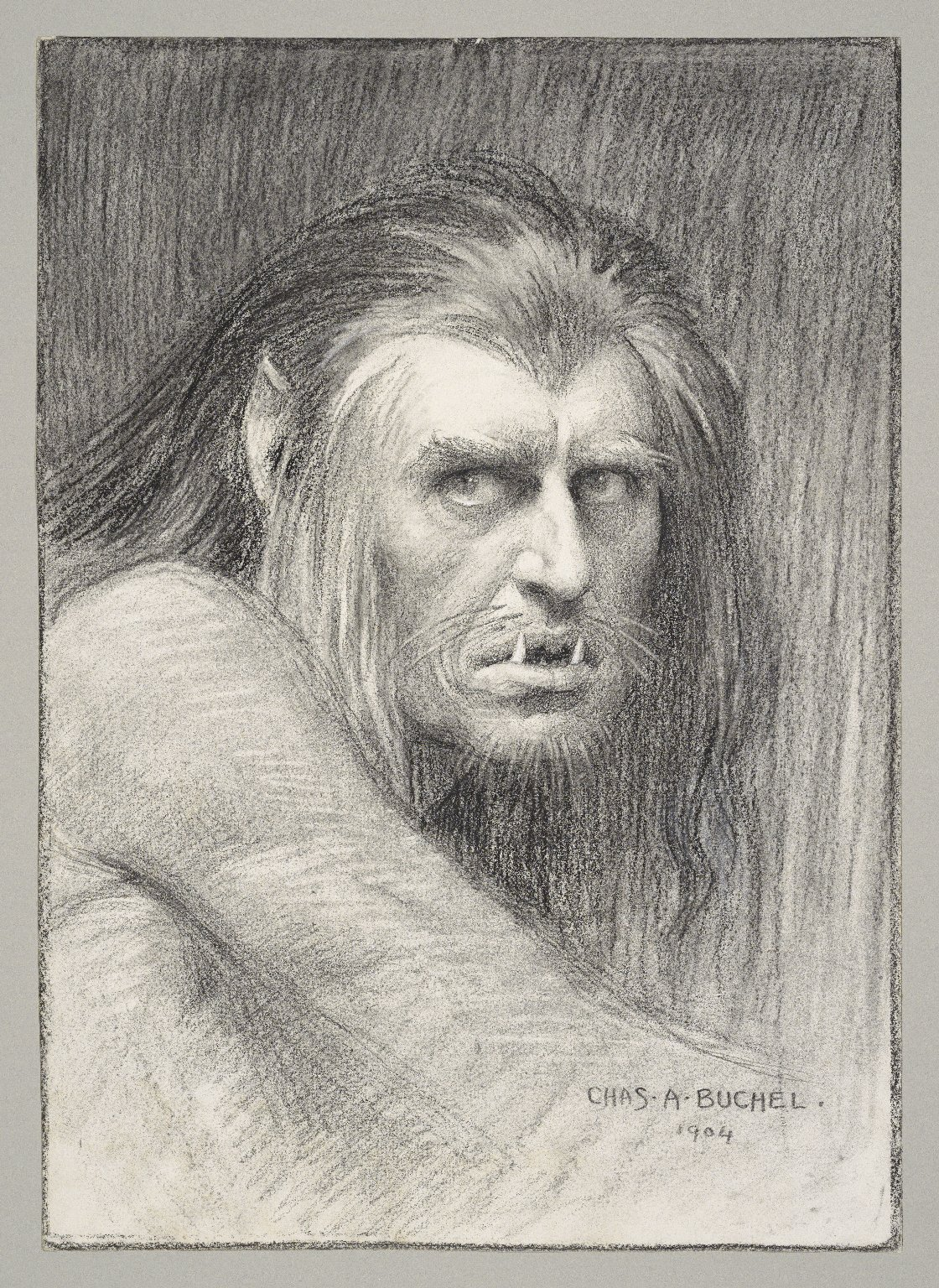
A charcoal drawing by Charles Buchel of Herbert Beerbohm Tree as Caliban in the 1904 production.

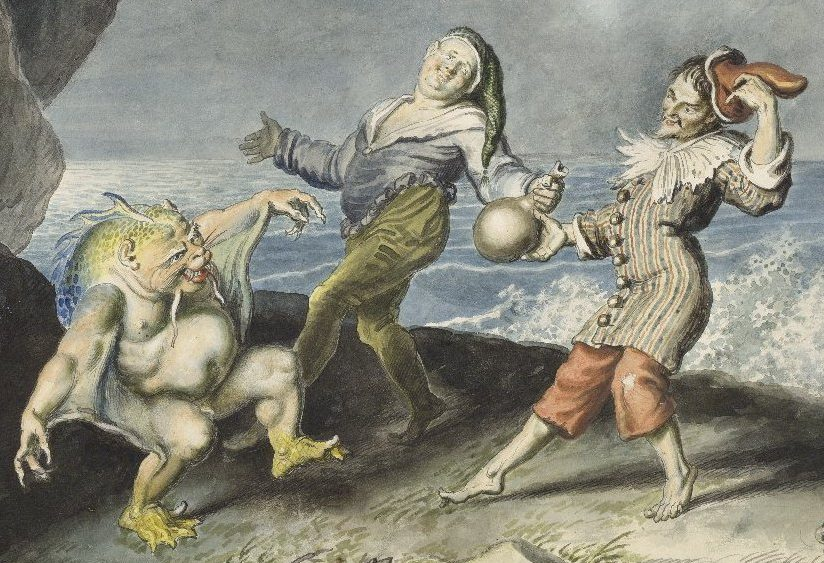
Caliban, Stephano and Trinculo dancing, detail of a painting by Johann Heinrich Ramberg

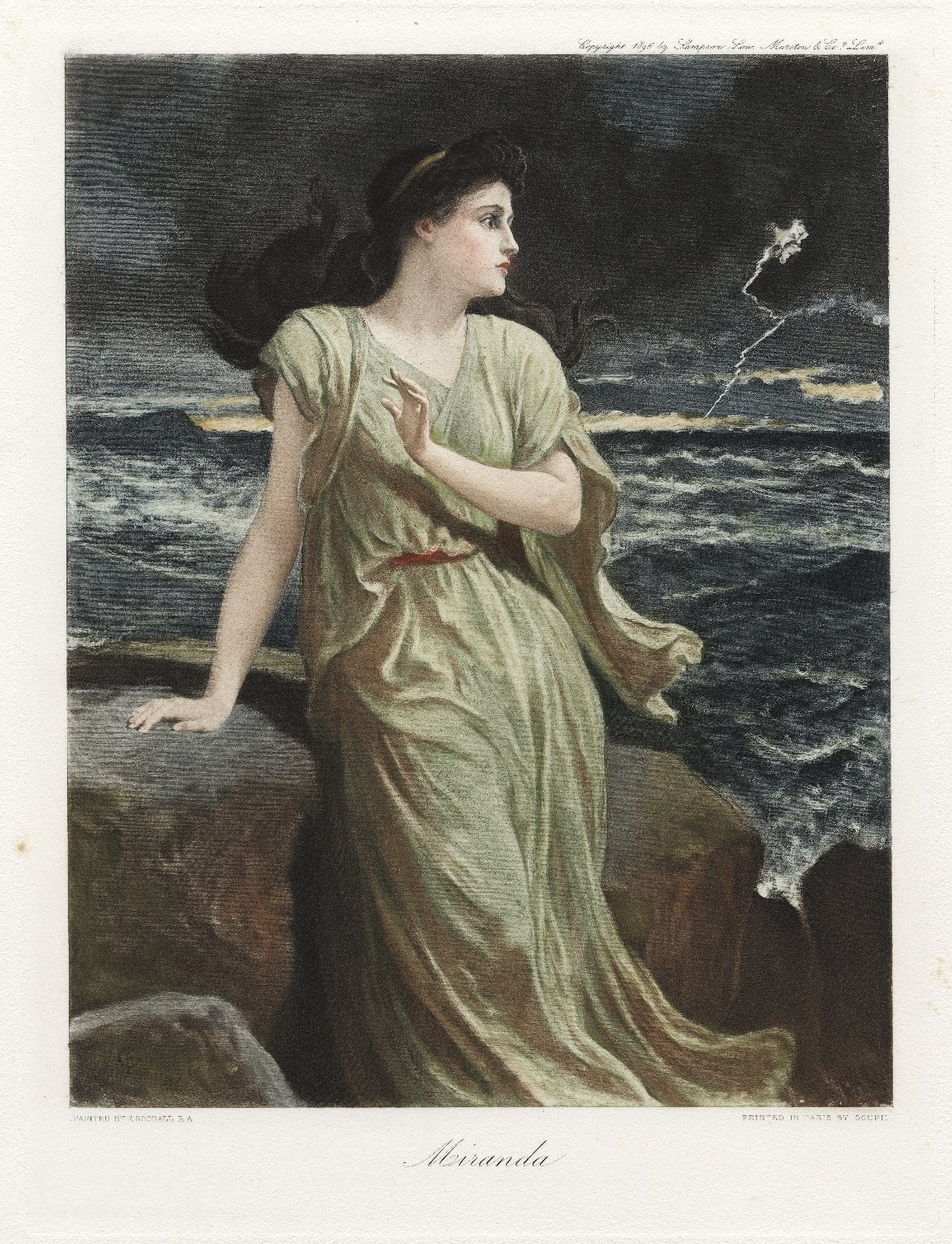
"Miranda" by Frederick Goodall, from the Graphic Gallery of Shakespeare's Heroines

== Citations ==
=== References ===
References to The Tempest are to the Arden Third Series Edition (i.e. Vaughan and Vaughan 1999). Under its numbering system 4.1.148 means act 4, scene 1, line 148; and 5.E.20 means the epilogue following act 5, line 20.

=== Bibliography ===
- Avery, Susan (1 May 2006). "Two Tempests, Both Alike: Shakespearean Indignity". New York Magazine.
- Blades, James; Holland, James (2020). "Celesta (Fr. céleste)". Grove Music Online (8th ed.). Oxford University Press. doi:10.1093/omo/9781561592630.013.3000000242. ISBN 978-1-56159-263-0. (subscription, Wikilibrary access, or UK public library membership required)
- Butler, Martin (2007). The Tempest. The Penguin Shakespeare. Penguin Books Limited. ISBN 978-0-141-01664-1.
- Cartelli, Thomas (1995). "After The Tempest: Shakespeare, Postcoloniality, and Michelle Cliff's New, New World Miranda". Contemporary Literature. 36 (1). University of Wisconsin Press: 82–102. doi:10.2307/1208955. ISSN 0010-7484. JSTOR 1208955. OCLC 38584750.
- Cohen, Aaron I. (1987). International Encyclopedia of Women Composers. Vol. 1. Books & Music (USA). p. 596. ISBN 978-0-9617485-0-0. OCLC 778974417.
- Cowdrey, Katherine (23 February 2016). "Margaret Atwood Reveals Title and Jacket for Hag-Seed". The Bookseller.
- Gallois, Jean (2001). "Chausson, (Amédée-)Ernest". Grove Music Online (8th ed.). Oxford University Press. doi:10.1093/gmo/9781561592630.article.05490. ISBN 978-1-56159-263-0. (subscription, Wikilibrary access, or UK public library membership required)
- Griffel, Margaret Ross (2018). Operas in German: A Dictionary. Blue Ridge Summit: Rowman & Littlefield Publishers. ISBN 9781442247963. OCLC 993752407.
- Halliday, F.E. (1964). A Shakespeare Companion, 1564–1964. Baltimore: Penguin. ISBN 0-7156-0309-4. OCLC 1508226102.
- Jacobs, Arthur (1986). Arthur Sullivan – A Victorian Musician. Oxford: Oxford University Press. ISBN 0-19-282033-8.
- La Rocco, Claudia (10 September 2013). "On a Diverse Island, a Play About a Magical One". The New York Times. p. C3.
- McElroy, Steven (24 November 2006). "A New Theater Company Starts Big". Arts, Briefly. The New York Times. p. E2.
- Mowat, Barbara A.; Werstine, Paul (2015). The Tempest. Folger Shakespeare Library. New York: Simon & Schuster. ISBN 978-1-5011-3001-4.
- Nixon, Rob (1987). "Caribbean and African Appropriations of The Tempest". Critical Inquiry. 13 (3). The University of Chicago Press: 557–578. doi:10.1086/448408. ISSN 0093-1896. OCLC 37521707. S2CID 155000165.
- Orgel, Stephen (1987). The Tempest. The Oxford Shakespeare. Oxford: Oxford University Press. ISBN 978-0-19-953590-3. OCLC 441786012.
- Orgel, Stephen. "Shakespeare Illustrated". In Shaughnessy (2007), pp. 67–92.
- Sanders, Julie (2007). Shakespeare and Music: Afterlives and Borrowings. Cambridge: Polity Press. ISBN 978-0-7456-3297-1. OCLC 144571464.
- Shaughnessy, Robert, ed. (2007). The Cambridge Companion to Shakespeare and Popular Culture. Cambridge: Cambridge University Press. ISBN 978-0-521-60580-9. OCLC 1229716002.
- Simon, Lizzie (2 September 2013). "The Teeming Tempest". New York Culture. The Wall Street Journal.
- Singh, Jyotsna G. (2019). Shakespeare and Postcolonial Theory. Bloomsbury, The Arden Shakespeare. ISBN 978-1-4081-8554-4. OCLC 1078960250.
- Singh, Jyotsna. "Post-colonial Criticism". In Wells & Orlin (2003), pp. 492-507.
- Tholl, Egbert (24 April 2006). "Prospero im Sturm der Sentimentalitäten" (in German). Berlin: Axel Springer SE. Die Welt.
- Tommasini, Anthony (2015-03-29). "Review: 'The Tempest Songbook' Closes Gotham Chamber Opera's Season". The New York Times. ISSN 0362-4331.
- Tovey, Donald Francis (1931). A Companion to Beethoven's Pianoforte Sonatas. Ams Pr. ISBN 978-0-404-13117-3. OCLC 2749943.
- Tuttle, Raymond (1996). "Michael Nyman: Noises, Sounds & Sweet Airs".
- Vaughan, Virginia Mason; Vaughan, Alden T. (1999). The Tempest. The Arden Shakespeare, Third Series. The Arden Shakespeare. ISBN 978-1-903436-08-0. OCLC 1424207290.
- Wells, Stanley; Orlin, Lena Cowen, eds. (2003). Shakespeare: An Oxford Guide. Oxford: Oxford University Press. ISBN 0-19-924522-3. OCLC 50920674.
- Wilson, Christopher R.; Sternfeld, F. W.; White, Eric Walter (2022). "Shakespeare, William". Grove Music Online (8th ed.). Oxford University Press. doi:10.1093/gmo/9781561592630.article.25567. ISBN 978-1-56159-263-0. (subscription, Wikilibrary access, or UK public library membership required)
- Working, Lauren; Loughnane, Rory (2024). The Tempest. The New Oxford Shakespeare. Oxford University Press. ISBN 978-0-19-286587-8. OCLC 1445769740.
- Ylirotu, Jeremias (2005). "Sibelius: Incidental Music for the Tempest, op. 109". Archived from the original on 24 September 2015.
