= Miranda (The Tempest) =

Character in The Tempest

- The Tempest character
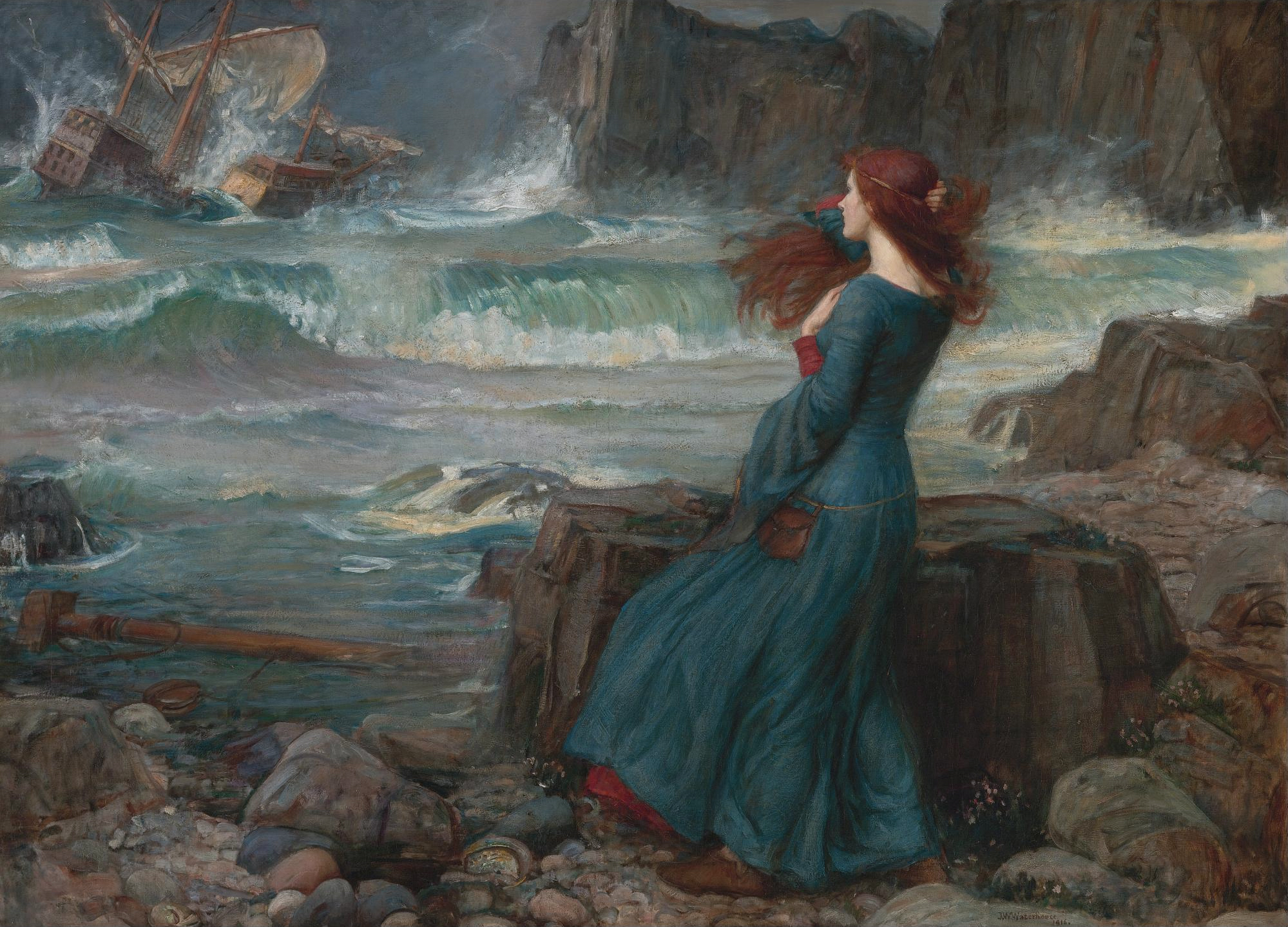
- John William Waterhouse (1849–1917), Miranda—The Tempest. 1916.
- Created by: William Shakespeare

In-universe information
- Family: Prospero (father); Prince Ferdinand (husband); Antonio (uncle); Alonso, King of Naples (father-in-law)

Miranda is one of the principal characters of William Shakespeare's The Tempest. She is the only female character to appear on stage.

Miranda is the daughter of Prospero, another of the main characters of The Tempest. She was banished to the Island along with her father at age three, and in the subsequent twelve years has lived with her father and their slave, Caliban, as her only company. She is openly compassionate and unaware of the evils of the world that surrounds her, learning of her father's fate only as the play begins.

== Origins ==
There is some speculation that Miranda, along with her husband, Ferdinand, may be intended to represent Elizabeth Stuart and her new spouse, Elector Frederick V, as The Tempest was originally performed for the court of Elizabeth's father, King James, in celebration of the Wedding of Princess Elizabeth and Frederick V of the Palatinate.

== Role in the play ==
The Tempest's second scene begins with Miranda, begging her father to spare the lives of the men at sea. She is fully aware of the powers Prospero possesses and begs him to cease the storm. In an act of bravery she challenges her father's wisdom, arguing that: "Had I been any god of power, I would / Have sunk the sea within the earth or ere / It should the good ship so have swallow'd and / The fraughting souls within her." As the scene progresses it is revealed to her that she is, in fact, the high ranking daughter of the Duke of Milan.

When Prospero's servant appears, Miranda is placed into a magically induced sleep. She awakens when she is summoned and it is quickly shown that the two have a contentious relationship, most probably due to Caliban's failed attempt to rape her, she refers to him as "a villain, sir, I do not love to look on." (I, ii).

As the moment with Caliban progresses, Miranda rebukes Caliban for the hatred he expresses towards her father:

Abhorred slave,
Which any print of goodness wilt not take,
Being capable of all ill! I pitied thee,
Took pains to make thee speak, taught thee each hour
One thing or other: when thou didst not, savage,
Know thine own meaning, but wouldst gabble like
A thing most brutish, I endow'd thy purposes
With words that made them known. But thy vile race,
Though thou didst learn, had that in't which
good natures
Could not abide to be with; therefore wast thou
Deservedly confined into this rock,

Who hadst deserved more than a prison.

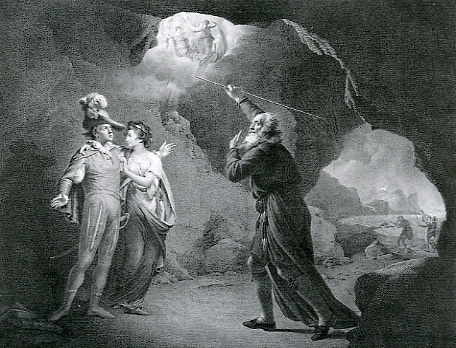
Miranda and Ferdinand, observing the masque.

Moments later she encounters Ferdinand for the first time and the two immediately fall in love. Miranda is amazed by the sight of him, questioning whether or not he is a spirit. While Prospero is pleased by the immediate connection the two display, he purposefully takes up an attitude of animosity towards the shipwrecked prince, forbidding a relationship between the two in order that Ferdinand will place a higher value on his daughter's affection.

During the encounter Miranda once again stands up to her father, arguing against his harsh treatment of Ferdinand and defending his honour when Prospero refers to him as nothing more than another Caliban.

Miranda's next appearance is in the third act. She and Ferdinand take a few moments together to get acquainted and are quickly married. She insists on doing the work that her father has assigned him, and freely admits her naivety to him before swearing her love for him. The scene ends with their marriage, Miranda swearing she will be his servant if Ferdinand will not take her as his wife.

Later on, she and her new husband enjoy a masque put on by her father in celebration of their nuptials. The celebration is interrupted by Prospero's sudden remembrance of Caliban's plot against him, after which Miranda displays a strong concern for her father's well-being.

Her last appearance is in the play's final scene. After Prospero reveals himself to the assembled crowd he reveals the happy couple engaged in a game of chess. Miranda is teasing Ferdinand for cheating but admits that even if he is dishonest, she is more than happy to believe it for the love she bears for him.

When she is finally introduced to the assembled crowd she reacts with wonder, proclaiming the play's most famous lines:

O wonder!
How many goodly creatures are there here!
How beauteous mankind is! O brave new world,

That has such people in't.

== Analysis ==
=== Feminine virtue personified ===
The Tempest interprets Miranda as a living representation of female virtue. Miranda is typically viewed as having believed herself to be subordinate towards her father. She is loving, kind, and compassionate as well as obedient to her father and is described as "perfect and peerless, created of every creature's best". She is, furthermore, the only female character within a cast of strong male figures, and much of her interaction on stage is dominated by the male figures around her. Miranda's behaviour is typically seen as completely dictated by Prospero, from her interactions with Caliban to her ultimate decision to marry Ferdinand. The traits that make her the pinnacle of femininity are her innocence and vulnerability, and these traits allow her to be readily manipulated first by her father then Ferdinand.

However, some critics argue that those same "feminine" traits enable her to be a strong female presence with important effects on the play's outcome. Throughout the course of the play, Miranda acts as a foil to Prospero's more violent instincts and serves as a sounding board to move the play's plot further. She is also a central figure in her father's revenge, enabling Prospero to gain political prestige through her marriage to the Prince of Naples, Ferdinand. Furthermore, while Miranda is very much subservient to Prospero's power, some critics argue that her obedience is a conscious choice. Miranda proves herself willing to challenge Prospero's power, first by calling into question his treatment of the shipwrecked sailors and then defying his commandment to have nothing to do with Prince Ferdinand.

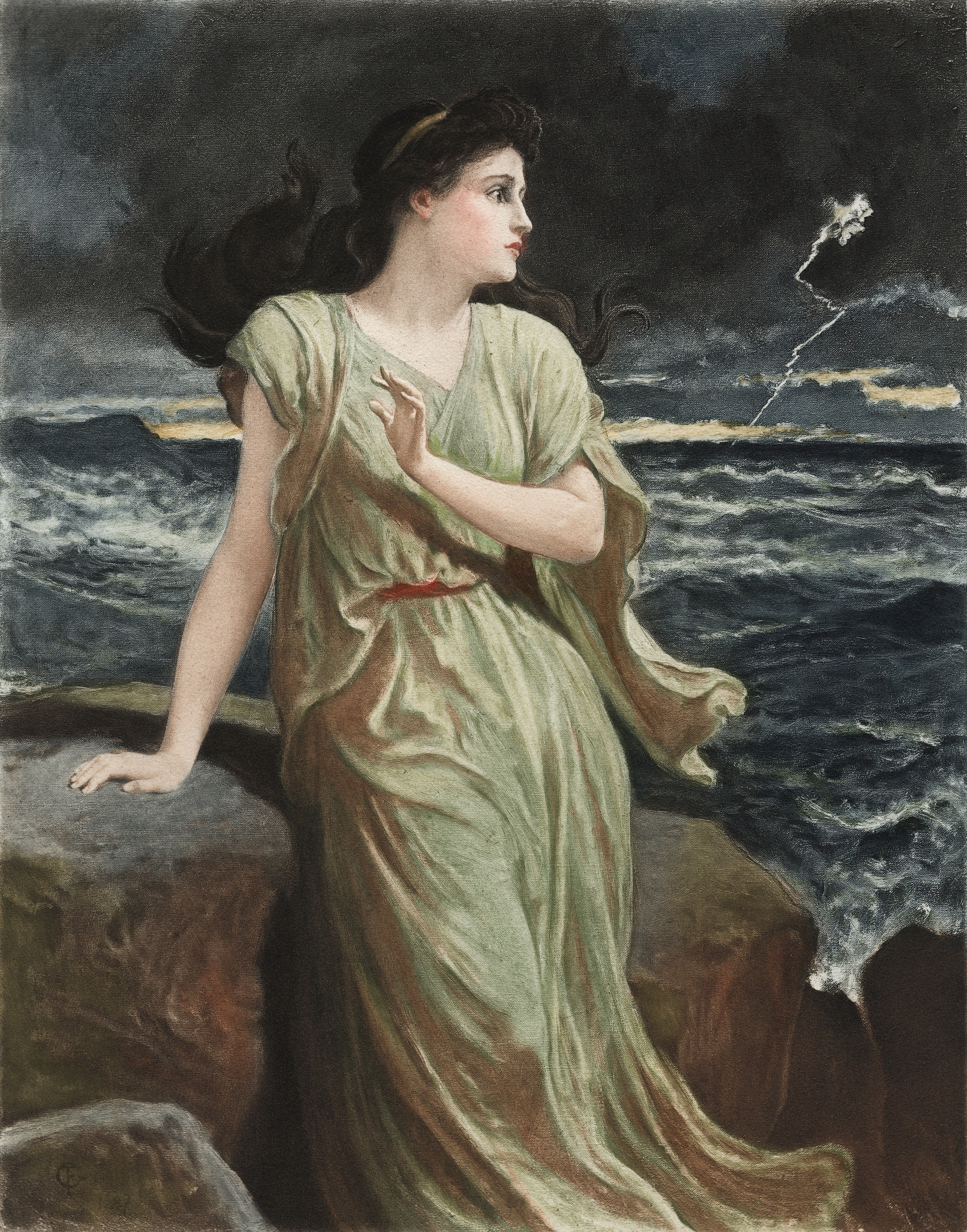
Miranda, watching the storm (1888), by Frederick Goodall

Her decision to pursue a relationship with Ferdinand is also interpreted by critics as an indication that her marriage to him is more than a simple political match. Miranda makes a very clear decision to seek out Ferdinand and offer her assistance, all the while worrying that her father will discover them. She is also the one to abandon traditional concepts of Elizabethan modesty by ardently stating her love for Ferdinand, proclaiming that "I am your wife, if you will marry me; / If not, I'll die your maid".

Critics also argue that Miranda's feminine presence is essential to the central theme of the play. Miranda's influence is what dulls the worst of her father's anger; Prospero cites her as being his reason for living after their initial banishment and he informs her that everything he does is "in care" of her. Michael Neill argues that Miranda's function on the Island is that of a Christ-figure—that she is the indicator of a given character's moral status within the social hierarchy of the island and that she also serves to protect the ethical code of the Island's inhabitants and visitors. Caliban, whom she rejects, is shown to be a monstrous figure, while Ferdinand—whom she embraces—is saved by her presence, her sympathy lightening the "baseness" of his given task. Critic Melissa Sanchez analyses Miranda in a similar light, discussing her as a representation of an "angelic—but passive—soul "caught in the conflict between enlightenment and base desire (represented by Prospero and Caliban).

Critic Lorie Leininger argues that Miranda fits into the colonialist interpretation of The Tempest in that Prospero's use of Miranda as an unwitting player in his political revenge is expressive of the play's sexist attitude towards women. Leininger equates that the sexist attitudes displayed towards Miranda are equitable to the undercurrents of racism shown in the treatment of Caliban. She states that Prospero's treatment of Miranda is in essence the same as his treatment of Caliban, describing his attitude towards both as indicative of their subjugation within the social hierarchy of the Island.

Leininger also argues that Miranda's sexualisation is a weapon used against her by her father, stating that Prospero uses Caliban's attempted assault and Ferdinand's romantic overtures to marginalise her, simplifying her into a personification of chastity. In Leininger's analysis, Caliban is treated in a similar fashion, forced into the role of an uncivilised savage without heed for his individual needs and desires—much in the same way that Miranda is expected to marry Ferdinand and reject Caliban's advances simply because her father wishes it.

Critic Jessica Slights creates claims that although many declare that Miranda only reflects the image of an obedient and subservient woman; she argues Miranda's character is independent. Miranda's upbringing shapes her character and the view of the world around her. She is not confined to social constructs as she did not grow up within a conventional society. This leads Miranda to view the world without preconceived ideas. Prospero is the main guardian in her life, but she developed personality traits such as kind-heartedness that are, as many describe, distinct in comparison to Prospero’s. In addition, she challenged the rules of traditional courtship when she pursued Ferdinand.

What I desire to give; and much less take

What I shall die to want. But this is trifling,

And all the more it seeks to hide itself,

The bigger bulk it shows. Hence, bashful cunning,

And prompt me, plain and holy innocence!

I am your wife, if you will marry me;

If not, I’ll die your maid. To be your fellow

You may deny me, but I’ll be your servant,

Whether you will or no.

Miranda's first interaction with Ferdinand was a revelation for her view on men besides Prospero. Having another person in her life shifted her attention away from Prospero, as she became aware of what she wanted out her life. This moment separates her past life to the life Miranda expects for the future. This was an opportunity that let her too not only to express her sexuality, but to also reclaim her independence.

=== Colonialism ===
While The Tempest is frequently analysed from postcolonial angles as a reaction to European colonialism in the early modern era, Miranda does not make an appearance in the majority of such analyses. As the play's only female character, Miranda functions mostly as a representation of women instead of a representation of a colonised group. Lorie Leininger, discussed in the previous section, argues that Miranda is part of a group subjugated by colonialism due to her gender, but as far as direct connections to European colonisation overseas, Miranda does not connect directly to the majority of postcolonial analyses.

However, Miranda can be interpreted as an allegory for the softer side of colonialism, portraying the more "missionary" aspect of colonisation attempts, in that she tries to educate Caliban instead of treating him as a sub-human citizen like her father seems keen to. She also displays far more sympathy to the shipwrecked Prince Ferdinand than her father does, and is eager to make his stay on the island as comfortable as possible. Her attitude towards the discovered peoples as well as the newly discovered castaway sharply contrasts her father's inclination to conquer and destroy, painting her not only as a compassionate figure but as one sympathetic to the colonial plight.

== Controversial lines ==
In Act I, Scene II, the lines spoken by Miranda to Caliban rebuking him for his ill-treatment of Prospero are frequently reassigned to Prospero. Editors and critics of the play felt that the speech was probably wrongly attributed to her either as a printing error or because actors preferred that no character would remain silent too long on stage.

Critics also argue that the language used by Miranda in this speech is out of character for her, given her lack of knowledge of the world that makes Caliban's behaviour so shocking, as well as the fact that her style of speaking strongly resembles Prospero's mannerisms. Furthermore, the use of anger and strong language removes the image of youth and innocence Shakespeare cultivates of Miranda and does not seem to be in keeping with her behaviour for the rest of the play.

However, others feel that Miranda's speech here is correctly attributed. As the play progresses, Caliban refers to Miranda as his "mistress", saying that it was Miranda who explained to him what the moon and stars are.

Furthermore, some critics do acknowledge that while the language in this particular speech is stronger than expected for Miranda, it is far weaker than Prospero's form of address would be given the situation.

== In astronomy ==
Miranda (moon), one of the moons of Uranus is named after her, in keeping with other Uranian moons named after characters from Shakespeare and Pope.

== In popular culture ==
Her lines spoken at the end of Act V, Scene I are the inspiration for the title of the novel Brave New World.

In SF novel Miranda by Antoni Lange from 1924, based on The Tempest, Miranda is a spiritual medium.

Clare Savage, a protagonist of Michelle Cliff's novel No Telephone to Heaven, is frequently seen to be a modernised Miranda. Miranda is featured in the 2019 novella Miranda in Milan, which imagines the events after The Tempest.
