= Franciszek Fiszer =

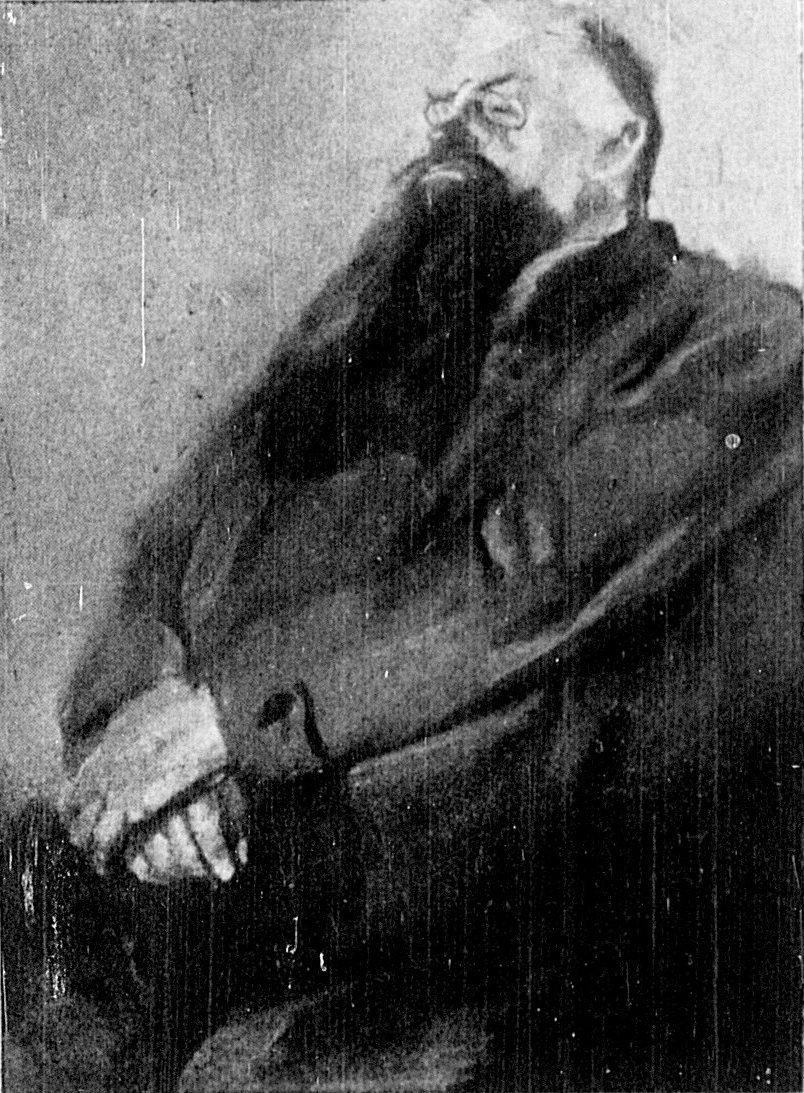
Black and white drawing of Franciszek Fiszer

Franciszek Fiszer (better known as Franc Fiszer; March 25, 1860 – April 9, 1937) was a Polish metaphysician and alchemist, a friend of the most notable writers and philosophers of contemporary Warsaw and one of Warsaw's semi-legendary people. Described as an erudite bon vivant and gourmand, he is remembered for a large number of anecdotes, jokes and sayings coined by him and about him.

The fictional character Ambroży Kleks in author Jan Brzechwa's Pan Kleks series of books was partly based on Fiszer.

== Biography ==
Franciszek Józef Marian Fiszer was born in 1860 in the Ławy manor near Ostrołęka, to Teresa née Glinczanka and Józef Fiszer. His father was from among the German nobility, polonised in the 18th century and a distant relative of General Stanisław Fiszer, while his mother was a member of the Polish gentry and owner of the said manor and village. Very little is known of Fiszer's childhood apart from the fact that he was a late child (both of his parents being over 40 at his birth) and that he became an orphan relatively soon.

In the 1880s Fiszer moved to Warsaw, where he started spending most of his time in Warsaw's cafes, restaurants and some of the most notable clubs of the era. With time, he became a characteristic part of the Warsaw's social panorama and became friends with most of the contemporary Polish writers, poets, artists and politicians. Renowned for his existential monologues and anecdotes, Fiszer's only pastime was the restaurants. In the interbellum, Fiszer became one of the most notable members of Warsaw's high society. A frequent guest at balls and parties, he became a living legend. His family village became neglected and soon had to be parcellated for debts. However, Fiszer's lifestyle did not suffer, as he barely ever had to pay for his meals, since he was seen by the gastronomers as an advertisement for their restaurants. That is why he often was a guest of Udziałowa, Ziemiańska, IPS, Oaza, Astoria or Blikle.

Among the closest friends of Franc Fiszer were Bolesław Leśmian (Fiszer is said to have invented his pen-name), Stefan Żeromski, Władysław Reymont, the Skamandrites Antoni Słonimski and Julian Tuwim, Jan Lechoń, Miriam, Artur Rubinstein and Antoni Lange. Although Fiszer never published any book himself, he is mentioned in nearly all memoirs by Warsaw's artists of the inter-war period. Also, he became the only person never to publish a book to be mentioned in both Stanisław Tatarkiewicz's Polish Biographical Dictionary and Leszek Kołakowski's Philosophy in Poland; Dictionary of Writers.

In 1985, most of the memoirs mentioning Franciszek Fiszer were collected by Roman Loth in a book titled Na rogu świata i nieskończoności (At the Crossing of World and Infinity).

== See also ==
Polish Wikiquote has quotations related to: Franciszek Fiszer

== Bibliography ==
1. various authors, ed. Roman Loth (1985). Na rogu świata i nieskończoności. Państwowy Instytut Wydawniczy, Warsaw. ISBN 83-06-01067-1.
2. various authors, ed. Maria Szyszkowska (1997). Spotkania z Fiszerem. Stowarzyszenie "Spolegliwość", Łomża.
