= Ziemiańska =

Prominent former coffeehouse in Warsaw

Coordinates: 52.238126°N 21.013163°E

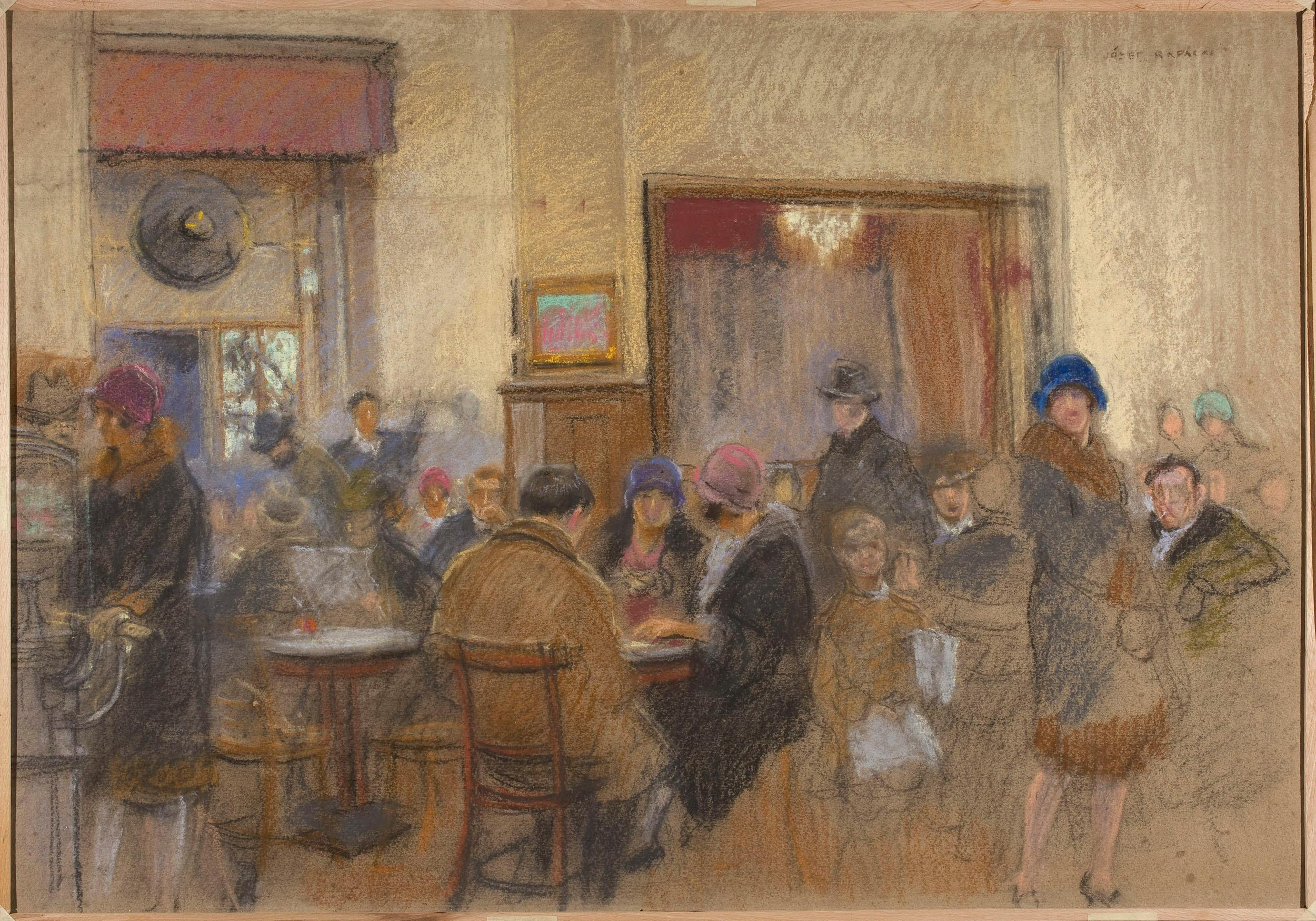
Inside Ziemiańska, Józef Rapacki, 1926

Ziemiańska or Mała Ziemiańska (the name coined after the term ziemianin, meaning member of Polish landed gentry) was a coffeehouse in Warsaw. It was notable as a meeting place of many of Poland's most prominent artists of the inter-war period.

The venture was founded in 1918 at 12, Mazowiecka Street in Warsaw's city centre. It was officially opened on April 14 of that year and its original owners were Jan Skępski and Karol Albrecht, two prominent pâtissier masters. Initially the cafe consisted only of a small room with several tables, later a gallery above was added with additional tables. The cafe lay roughly halfways between the Warsaw University, the Filharmony, Zachęta Art Gallery and many notable cultural facilities. Because of that, it started to be frequented by artists of all sorts. Among the most prominent to be frequent guests there were the Skamandrites, including poets Julian Tuwim, Antoni Słonimski, Jan Lechoń, Jarosław Iwaszkiewicz and Kazimierz Wierzyński, as well as their frequent companion Franciszek Fiszer. The table of the poets occupied the gallery, while one of the tables at the ground floor was reserved for painters and sculptors. Among its owners were Zofia Stryjeńska, Tadeusz Gronowski and Henryk Kuna, but also a poet Bolesław Leśmian. Among frequent guests were also Eugeniusz Bodo (dubbed the king of Polish actors), Adolf Dymsza, Jadwiga Smosarska, Leon Schiller, Jerzy Zaruba, Ludwik Solski and Konstanty Ildefons Gałczyński, who met his future wife there. Another group of guests were politicians, including Poland's prime minister Walery Sławek, minister of foreign affairs Józef Beck and General Bolesław Wieniawa-Długoszowski

After the initial success, the owners of Ziemiańska opened up several other cafe houses in Warsaw. The most prominent of them (and the largest) was opened nearby, at the corner of Kredytowa and Jasna Street. From then on the original venue at Mazowiecka started to be called "Mała Ziemiańska" (Small Ziemiańska), as opposed to "Duża Ziemiańska", or Big Ziemiańska. The success of the pastries served there allowed the owners to open a similar cafe in Nice, which however was closed in the 1930s, following protests from French pastry makers.

The Ziemiańska (and the building) ceased to exist during the Warsaw Uprising. It was not rebuilt.
