= Miranda (novel) =

1924 novel by Antoni Lange

- Cover for "Miranda" from a 1984 edition
- Author: Antoni Lange
- Language: Polish
- Publication date: 1924
- Publication place: Poland
- English publication date: 1968
- Media type: Novel

Miranda is a novel written by Antoni Lange in 1924. It was the last great work of Lange before he died, and his most famous book today. It is said that Miranda is an "occultic fiction" and a "romance ranked to a philosophical treaty". The novel is also known as "novelty writing" which conciliates dystopia and utopia. It is a matter of opinion to classify the novel to modernism or interwar period.

== Explanation of the novel's title ==
The title of the novel refers to the person of Miranda from Shakespeare's play called The Tempest. Miranda is also full of allusions to many classics such as: Men Like Gods by H. G. Wells, The City of the Sun by Tommaso Campanella, Lenore by Edgar Allan Poe, Genezis z Ducha by Juliusz Słowacki, poems by Cyprian Kamil Norwid, writings of Friedrich Nietzsche (criticism of concept of the Übermensch), Arthur Schopenhauer, Plato and Sanskrit epics of ancient India.

== Plot summary ==
The novel tells about ideal civilisation of powerful mages which have developed paranormal skills like telepathy, levitation and mediumism. The Brahmins value anarchy, freedom, peace, free love and anti-work. Their country is organized by Ministry of Love, Ministry of Power and Ministry of Wisdom, and they use a strange substance classified as Nivridium in order to their self-perfect idea. The main plot is the history of love of Polish emigrant Jan Podobłoczny (Lange's own porte-parole) to the materialization of an ideal woman named Damayanti. A tragic end of their romance comes from clash between physical and spiritual sides of human existence. In the last chapter of the novel, Damayanti sacrifices her body in order to let her spirit fly to higher stage of consciousness.

Miranda is a Scottish spiritual medium, who lives in Warsaw. She can contact the soul of Damayanti and materialize the mysterious person of Lenore, who meets Jan Podobłoczny when he is close his death. In the moment when Damayanti dies, Miranda disappears.

== Publication history ==
The novel was translated into English (in 1968), French, Spanish and Italian.
