= Józef Baka =

Polish writer (d. 1780)

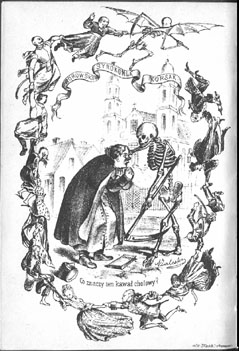
Imaginative, humouristic illustration from a 19th-century edition of Baka's poems, showing Józef Baka and Death

Józef Baka (Lithuanian: Juozapas Baka; died 1780) was a late Baroque Polish poet, Jesuit priest and missionary. Born in March of either 1706 or 1707, probably in Nowogrodek, Baka is regarded as one of the most prominent poets of the 18th century Polish–Lithuanian Commonwealth.

== Life ==
=== Early years ===
Little is known about early days of his life, furthermore, no portrait of Baka has been found so far. He was born into a wealthy family living in the Grand Duchy of Lithuania and his father Adam Baka was a treasurer of the Mscislaw Voivodeship.

Baka entered the Society of Jesus on July 16, 1723, and in 1735 he was ordained a priest, five years later becoming a monk. He studied at the Vilna Academy, but little is known about his curriculum. It has only been established that Baka passed a theology exam on May 7, 1736. Also, in late 1730s, he lectured rhetorics at the academy.

Some time in late 1730s or early 1740s, Baka left Vilna for the town of Kraslaw (now Latvia, then Inflanty Voivodeship). There, he worked as a priest and a missionary, in the Jesuit office Missio Plateriana. It was most likely in Kraslaw that he wrote his first works. Later on, Baka moved to the village of Blonie (also Livonia), where he opened his own office, which he called Missio Bakana. He often traveled across the area, trying to be in touch with local population.

=== Late years and death ===
Baka spent final years of his life in Vilna, where he moved for unknown reasons. Since 1756 or 1768, he lived in so-called House of Professors near Jesuit Church of Saint Casimirius. He was very active, sometimes visiting other places, such as Nowogrodek. His sermons were very popular, and in 1773 he was named Doctor of Theology by the Vilna Academy. He died unexpectedly on June 2, 1780, in Warsaw. It is unknown why he visited the capital of the Commonwealth, according to available sources, he had never left the Grand Duchy of Lithuania before. His death was mentioned by local daily Gazeta Warszawska. Baka was buried in Warsaw, in a Jesuit church on Świętojańska Street.
