= Bolesław Leśmian =

Polish poet and artist (1877–1937)

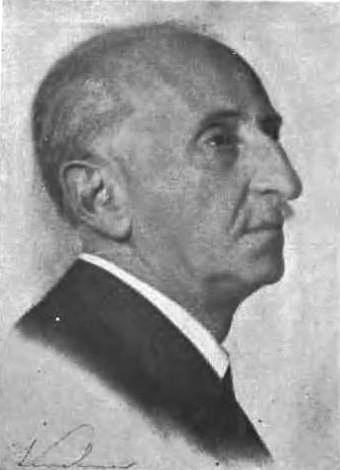
- Born: Bolesław Lesman; 22 January 1877; Warsaw, Congress Poland, Russian Empire
- Died: 5 November 1937 (aged 60); Warsaw, Poland
- Resting place: Powązki Cemetery
- Occupation: Poet

Signature
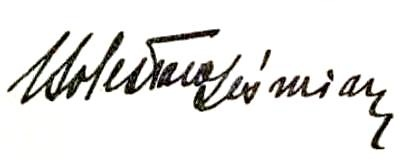

Bolesław Leśmian (né Lesman; 22 January 1877 – 5 November 1937) was a Polish poet, artist, and member of the Polish Academy of Literature, one of the first poets to introduce Symbolism and Expressionism to Polish verse.

Though largely a marginal figure in his lifetime, Leśmian is now considered one of Poland's greatest poets. He is, however, little known outside Poland, mostly on account of his neologism-rich idiosyncratic style, dubbed "almost untranslatable" by Czesław Miłosz and "the ultimate and overwhelming proof for the untranslatability of poetry" by noted Polish Shakespearean translator, Stanisław Barańczak.

== Life ==
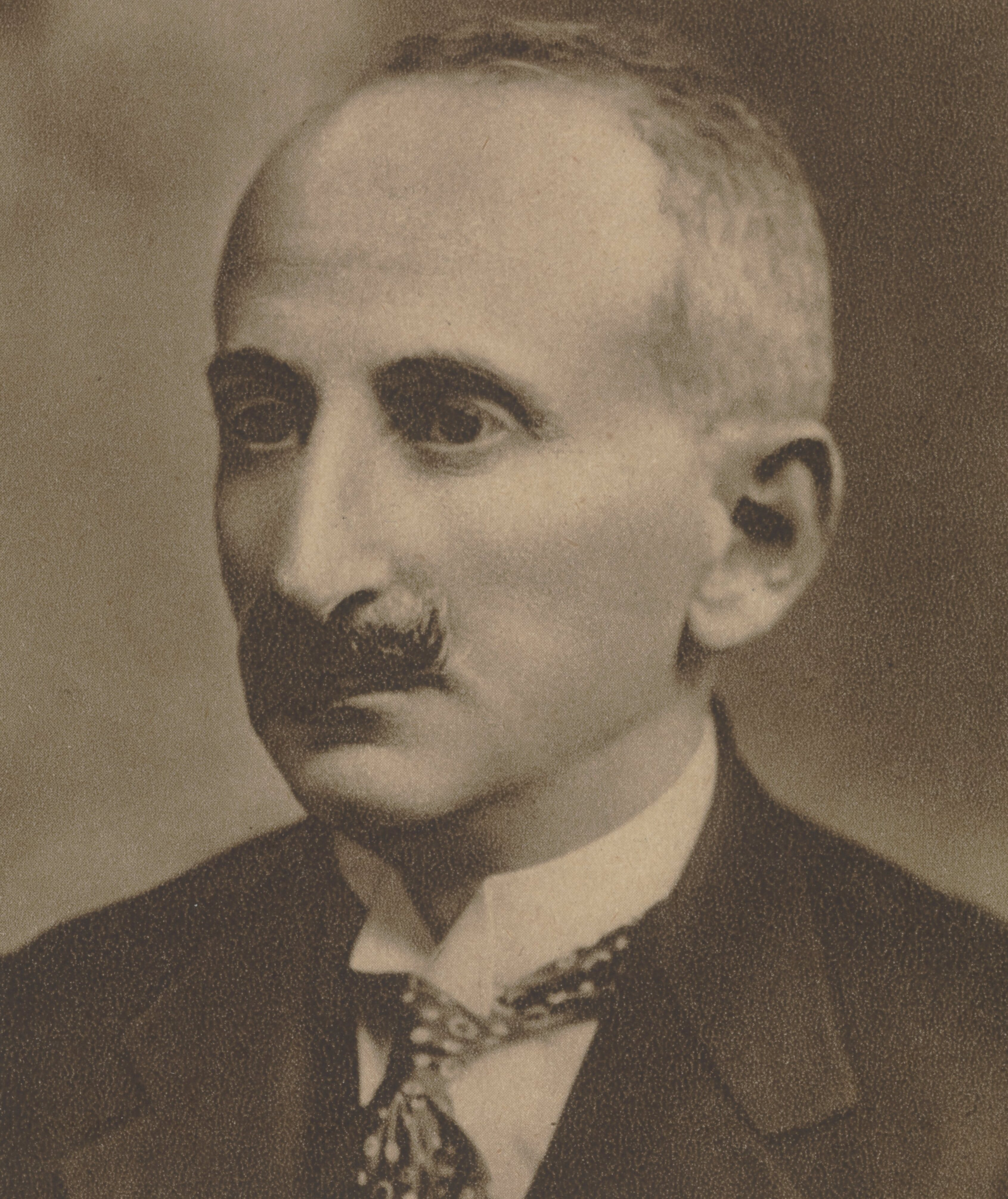
Bolesław Leśmian

Bolesław Leśmian was born on 22 January 1877 in Warsaw, Congress Poland, Russian Empire, to a Polonized Jewish family. He spent his childhood and youth in Kiev, where he graduated from the law faculty of Saint Vladimir University. In 1901 he returned to Warsaw. From there, he visited various European cities, including Munich and Paris, where he married painter Zofia Chylińska. Heavily influenced by French modernists, Leśmian returned to Warsaw, where he became cofounder of an experimental Artistic Theatre. There he also met one of his closest friends, Zenon Przesmycki, with whom he became involved in the publication of Chimera, an art newspaper.

Although he made his debut in 1895 (a series of poems published in Wędrowiec magazine), his works initially went unnoticed. To sound "more Polish", Leśmian adopted a slightly modified version of his surname which included typically Polish sounds (previously it had been Lesman). According to various conflicting sources, the author of the pen-name which eventually became his official surname was either the known poet and poet's uncle Antoni Lange, or a renowned bon-vivant of Warsaw, Franc Fiszer. The first booklet issued in Warsaw in 1912 (Sad Rozstajny) did not bring him much publicity either, and in 1912 Leśmian moved back to France. He returned in 1914.

From 1918 until 1934, he worked as a notary of large landed estates in Hrubieszów and then as a lawyer in Zamość. At the same time he published the best known of his books: Łąka (The Meadow, 1920) and Napój cienisty (Shadowy Drink, 1936). In 1933, he was accepted as a permanent member of the Polish Academy of Literature. In 1935, he moved back to Warsaw, where he died two years later. He is buried in Powązki Cemetery, in the Alley of the Meritorious, among other notable Polish writers, politicians and military men.

Leśmian and Chylińska had two daughters, one of who, Wanda "Dunia" Leśmianówna, would later marry British adventurer and traveller Denis Hills. Actress and singer Gillian Hills - famous for her brief appearances in Antonioni's Blowup and Kubrick's A Clockwork Orange in two similar scenes - was born of this marriage in 1944. Leśmian was nephew of the famous poet and writer of the Young Poland movement, Antoni Lange, and the cousin of another notable poet of the epoch, Jan Brzechwa.

== Work ==
Leśmian's style is unique and easily recognizable, intuitively accessible despite its idiosyncrasy. In his poems, in a fantastical, mythical environment—often inhabited with creatures taken from Polish folklore and traditions—Leśmian expounds his life philosophy, revolving around his personal fascinations with God and death. The protagonists of his works are usually "handicapped humans," struggling between Culture and Nature, unable to accept their in-between existence. Leśmian describes the only ones who are able to live with both Culture and Nature simultaneously are poets, the last examples of "the primitive mankind."

Relying heavily on "the vertiginous word-formation potential of Polish," Leśmian's style is especially notable for its numerous neologisms, many of which are still in use in everyday Polish language (as opposed to, say, Cyprian Norwid's similar experiments). Referred to as "leśmianisms" by subsequent scholars, these neologisms are usually the product of the versatile "prefix+verb/noun(+suffix)" formula natural to most Slavic languages, but peculiar to many other languages, rendering Leśmian's poetry "almost untranslatable" into English.

Some of Leśmian's favourite prefixes include those who imply a lack of certain qualities (like bez- or nie-, loosely, "without," or "non-"), leading certain scholars to dub him "the Dante of non-being." Considered by many to be one of the greatest Polish poets in history, Leśmian's art captivated many during interwar period, as he was the creator of a uniquely stylised Polish folk ballad and profoundly personal — and, nevertheless, popular — metaphysical lyrics. In addition, he is frequently mentioned as the most notable poet of erotic verses in the history of the Polish language.

== Bibliography ==
- Sad rozstajny, (Bifurcated Orchard, Warsaw, 1912)
- Klechdy sezamowe (Sesame Tales, Warsaw, 1913)
- The Adventures of Sindbad the Seafarer" (Adventures of Sindbad the Sailor, Warsaw, 1913)
- Łąka (Meadow, Warsaw, 1920)
- Napój cienisty, (Shadowy Drink, Warsaw, 1936)
- Dziejba leśna (Forest Happenings, Warsaw, 1938)
- Klechdy polskie (Polish Tales, London 1956)
- Skrzypek opętany (Possessed Violin Player, Warsaw, 1985)
- Pochmiel księżycowy (Russian, Lunar the-day-after, Warsaw, 1987; Polish translation by Jerzy Ficowski)
- Zdziczenie obyczajów pośmiertnych (Savagery of Posthumous Habits, Cracow, 1998)
- 33 of the Most Beautiful Love Poems (selected poems: Polish-English edition), New York, 2011; English translation by Marian Polak-Chlabicz)
- Marvellations: The Best-Loved Poems (selected poems: Polish-English edition), New York, 2014; English translation by Marian Polak-Chlabicz)
- Beyond the Beyond (selected poems: Polish-English edition), New York, 2017; English translation by Marian Polak-Chlabicz)

== See also ==
A tombeau for Lesmian was written by Roman Turovsky.

- Polish literature
- List of Poles
