= Antoni Lange =

Polish writer and philosopher

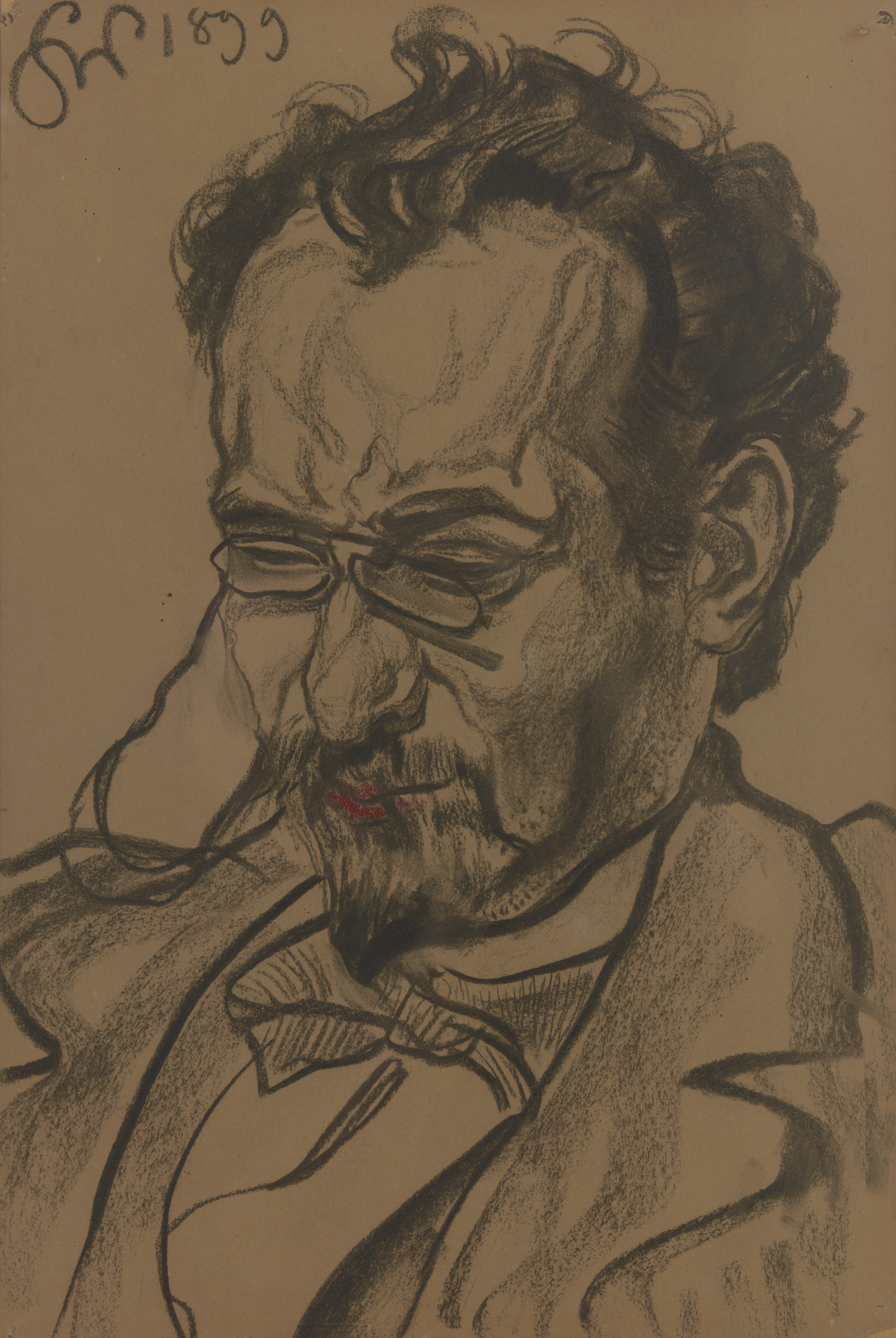
- Portrait of Antoni Lange by Stanisław Wyspiański, 1899
- Born: 28 April 1862; Warsaw, Congress Poland, Russian Empire
- Died: 17 March 1929 (aged 66); Warsaw, Second Polish Republic
- Occupations: Poet, Philosopher, Novelist, translator
- Writing career
- Pen name: Antoni Wrzesień, Napierski
- Period: 19th–20th century
- Genres: poem, epic poem, narrative poem, novel, short story, essay, drama, frame story
- Movements: Modernism, Symbolism, Young Poland precursor to existentialism, collage, imagism and science-fiction

Philosophical work
- Region: Western philosophy: Polish philosophy
- School: Philosophy of genesis
- Main interests: Culture; Eschatology; Ethics; Historiosophy; Metaphysics

Signature
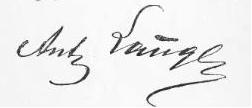

Antoni Lange (28 April 1862 – 17 March 1929) was a Polish poet, philosopher, polyglot (15 languages), writer, novelist, science-writer, reporter and translator. A representative of Polish Parnassianism and symbolism, he is also regarded as belonging to the Decadent movement. He was an expert on Romanticism, French literature and a popularizer of Eastern cultures. His most popular novel is Miranda.

He translated English, French, Hungarian, Italian, Spanish, Indian, American, Serbian, Egyptian and Oriental writers into Polish and Polish poets into French and English. He was also one of the most original poets of the Young Poland movement. His work is often compared to Stéphane Mallarmé and Charles Marie René Leconte de Lisle.

Lange was an uncle of the poet Bolesław Leśmian.

== Life ==
Lange was born in Warsaw into the patriotic Jewish family of Henryk Lange (1815–1884) and Zofia née Eisenbaum (1832–1897). His father took part in the November Uprising against the Russian Partition of Poland. He was an admirer of Romantic literature and its ideals. Antoni Lange enrolled at Warsaw University, but around 1880, he was expelled for his patriotic activity by the Tsarist namiestnik Apuchtin, who ruled the university at that time. He supported himself financially as a tutor but also published poetry under the pen-names Napierski and Antoni Wrzesień. He decided to study in Paris, where he encountered new trends in literature, philosophy and art. In France, he became familiar with the theories of Jean Martin Charcot, as well as Spiritualism, parapsychology, the philosophy of Arthur Schopenhauer and Friedrich Nietzsche, oriental religions, European and Eastern literature and modern literary criticism. He took part in the literary meetings of Stéphane Mallarmé.

Lange returned to his homeland upon Poland's return to independence, and became one of the better known members of the Warsaw Society of Writers and Journalists (Warszawskie Towarzystwo Literatów i Dziennikarzy), the precursor of the Polish Academy of Literature founded in 1933. Bolesław Prus, Julian Ochorowicz and Lange were the first Polish spiritists. He rented an apartment at Nowy Świat Street together with Władysław Reymont, a Polish writer and the winner of the Nobel Prize of 1924. Stanisław Brzozowski called Lange a real and not frequently European mind and Julian Tuwim called him a master of reflective poetry. During this time Lange was a member of the Society of Polish Writers and Journalists. However, with the sharp growth of his popularity as a poet his poems became more sceptical, pessimistic and hermetic. The main theme of the poems of this period was the feeling of being isolated and misunderstood by the crowd.

Przychodzę do was z daleka...

Przychodzę do was z daleka,
Przychodzę z nieznanych stron.
[...]
Dusza twa była samotną
Jako barka bez kotwicy.

I come to you from far away

I come to you from far away,
I come to you from unknown places.
[...]
Your soul was as lonely
As a barge without an anchor.

At the beginning of the 20th century, he withdrew from public life and became lonely and forgotten. He collected his last poems in notebooks and never allowed anyone to publish them.

Lange's prestige as a writer was undermined by a new generation of avant-gardists. He died in isolation, destitution and obscurity in Warsaw in 1929. He never married and had no children.

Antoni Lange was a friend of Stéphane Mallarmé, Jan Kasprowicz and Stanisław Przybyszewski.

There are only two portraits of Lange, one of which was painted by Stanisław Wyspiański in 1890.

== Writing ==
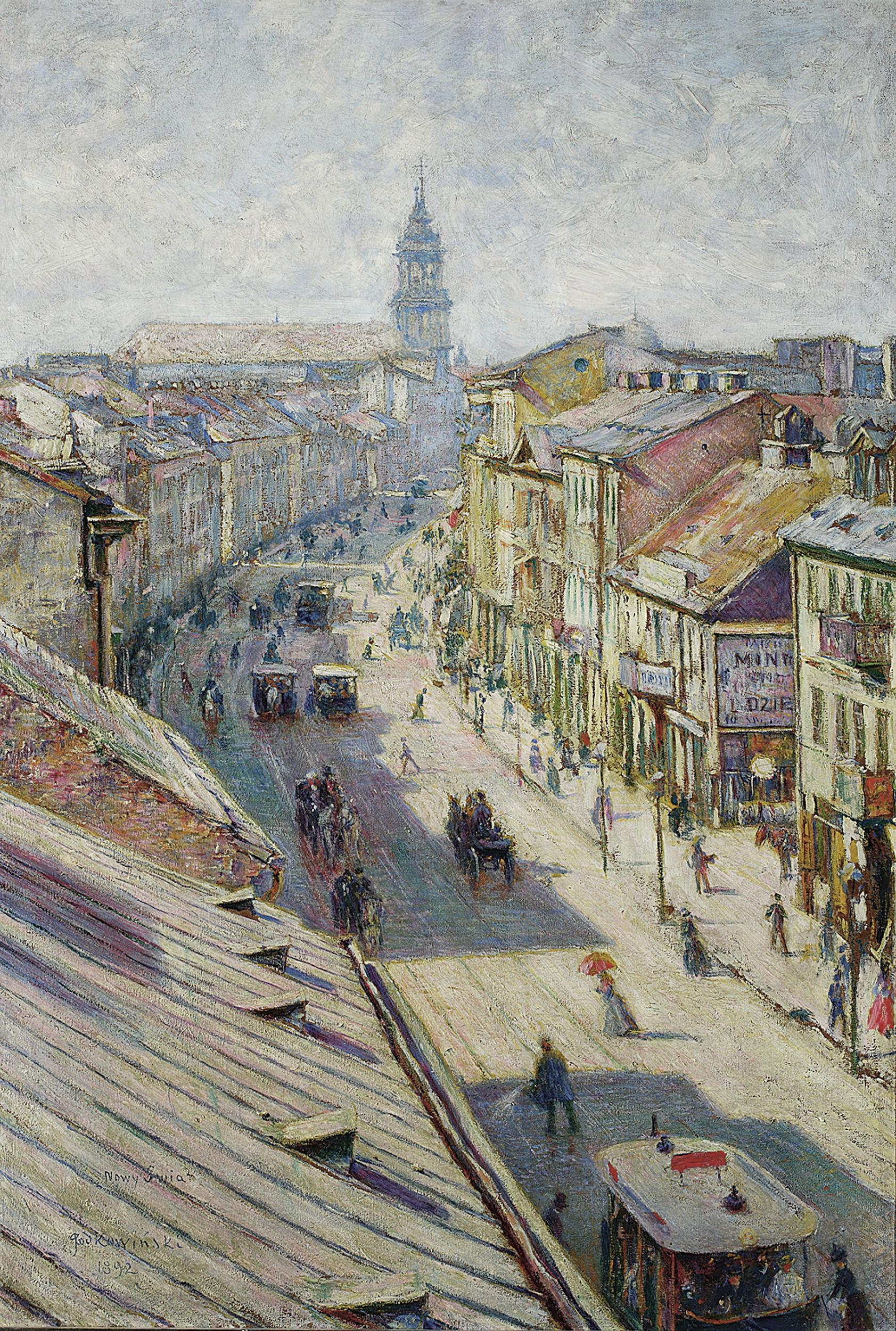
Władysław Podkowiński, Nowy Świat Street in Warsaw on a summer’s day (1900), where Lange lived

Lange was a prolific and versatile writer. He wrote many novels (Miranda), short stories (Zbrodnia, Amor i Faun), dramas (Malczewski, Wenedzi), essays and poems. Lange's poetry is contemplative and erudite. It connects the traditions of European culture with Buddhism. The overriding theme of Lange's existential concerns was 'extremity' and the 'cycle' of death. In order to form the poetry, Lange connects to contradictory points of impressionism, romantic sentimentality and experimental theories of Stéphane Mallarmé. Lange was fond of rare poetic forms: acrostics, dactyls, pantoums, praeludiums, scherzos, canticles and triolets. He was also the author of many pastorals concerning the metaphysical side of village life; historiosophical songs inspired by the philosophy of Juliusz Słowacki; and exotic genesis mythologies from all over the world (from Mexico to Japan).

Lange was also the author of many lyrical essays presenting original views about the relationship between poet and reader concerning eschatological issues (Thoughts, The Grave).

In the first phase of his writing, he was a lover of aestheticism, formal innovation and the theories of Stéphane Mallarmé. However, later he faced primitivism, anonymity, writings of folk poets and 16th century poets and blank verse.

Both Lange and Jerzy Żuławski are often referred to as "The Pioneers of Polish Science-Fiction". Lange's short stories from the book W czwartym wymiarze (In the Fourth Dimension, 1912) such as Babunia (Grandma), Rozaura, Lenora, Rebus (Puzzle), Nowe mieszkanie (The New House) and Memoriał doktora Czang-Fu-Li (Dr. Chang Fu Li's Report) are regarded as early examples of science fiction and weird fiction in Poland. The main themes of the stories are: hypnosis, the elixir of youth, eternal love and the materialization of phantoms. On a different note, Dr. Chang Fu Li's eponymous report, "written in Paris in 2652", is concerned with the climate change brought about by the re-routing of the Gulf Stream and the subsequent freezing over of Europe, with China taking over as the leading civilization.

Lange's works influenced many poets of the next generation, for example: Bolesław Leśmian, Antoni Słonimski, Julian Tuwim, Julian Przyboś, Jan Lechoń, Leopold Staff. Paradoxically, most of these poets criticized Lange for his anachronism, eccentricity and overintellectualism.

Lange was also a left-wing journalist. He wrote for many important Polish newspapers such as Pobudka, Tygodnik Illustrowany and Przegląd tygodniowy. He created an original way of cultural assimilation for Jews via mixed marriage.

Lange's numerous translations of classic 19th-century literature from all over the world are still highly regarded. His translations of The Golem by Gustav Meyrink and poems by Charles Baudelaire, Edgar Allan Poe and George Gordon Byron are masterpieces of Polish translation. He also edited many anthologies of his own translations of Egyptian, Syrian, Persian, Arabic, Indian and Hebrew poems.

His main sources of inspiration were: the poetry of the Three Bards; the theories of Stéphane Mallarmé; the writings of Charles-Marie-René Leconte de Lisle; Sanskrit epics of ancient India such as Mahabharata or Savitri; and the poetry of the Polish Baroque era, especially metaphysical poets such as Mikołaj Sęp Szarzyński and Józef Baka because of their obsession with death.

=== Vita Nova and other love poems ===
Lange was the author of many love poems influenced by Romanticism, spiritualism and Indian mythology.

Gdzie ty jesteś, bogini?

Gdzie jesteś, czarodziejko, bogini, królewno,
Życiodawczy, uwodny duchu ty krwiożerny,
Cudotwórcza, stugłowa, wieczna hydro Lerny,
Syreno, co mię nęcisz w Scyllę grobów śpiewną?

Where are you, goddess?

Where are you sorceress, goddess, queen?
Life giving, deluding and bloodthirsty phantom.
Hundred headed thaumaturgus, immortal Hydra of Lerna.
Siren who calls me to Scylla singing of the graves.

Other love poems by Lange, for example Vita Nova (A New Life), written in 1898, present an original vision of a decadent and melancholy poet who momentarily becomes an Übermensch thanks to the illusion of requited love. Unfortunately, there is always a conflict between the vision of ideal love and its realisation. Lange also takes note of the "painful impossibility" of the absolute and eternal union of lovers' souls; he creates a pessimistic vision of the relationship between man and woman, which is always burdened by the certainty that complete fulfilment is impossible.

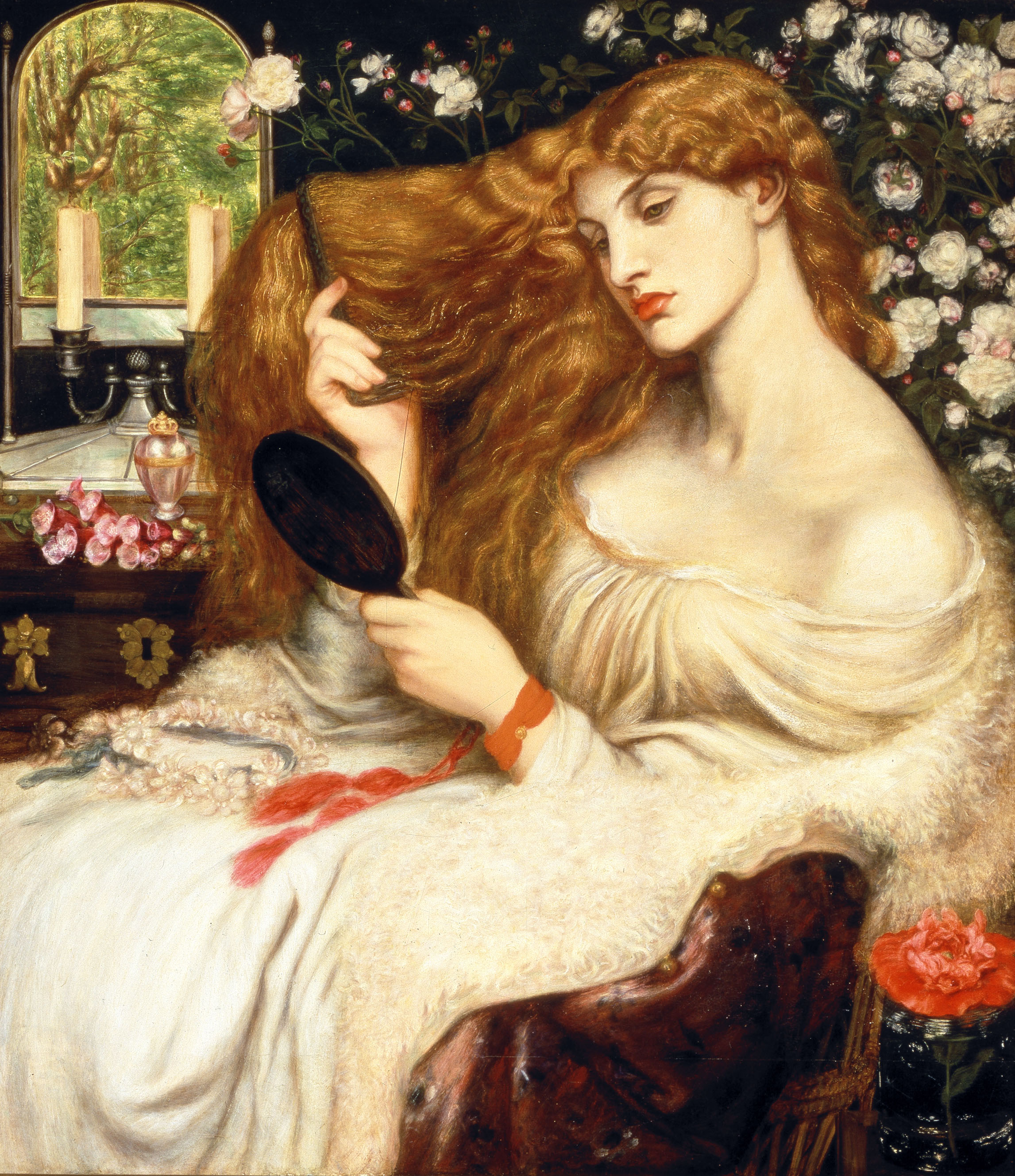
Lady Lilith by Dante Gabriel Rossetti. The symbol of Lilith was frequently used by Lange

In Lange's verses, love always makes the subject feel as if he has been exiled from and deprived of a latent part of his own existence, but simultaneously he believes that lovers can communicate and feel the same by transmitting their pain and the power of their affection in defiance of metaphorical distance.

=== Deuteronomion, The Hour, Logos and Sonnets of Veda ===
The most characteristic feature of Lange's writings is the strong influence of Eastern traditions, religions and philosophies such as the Veda, Brahminism and Buddhism.

Written in 1887, the cycle of seven sonnets entitled The Sonnets of Veda shows the seven stages of human existence on the way to Nirvana.

Similar in form to the Sonnets of Veda is the Logos cycle of ten sonnets which discuss ten points of view on the logos of history by ten outstanding representatives of the historiosophy of Polish Romanticism. The poems are strongly influenced by ideas of messianism.

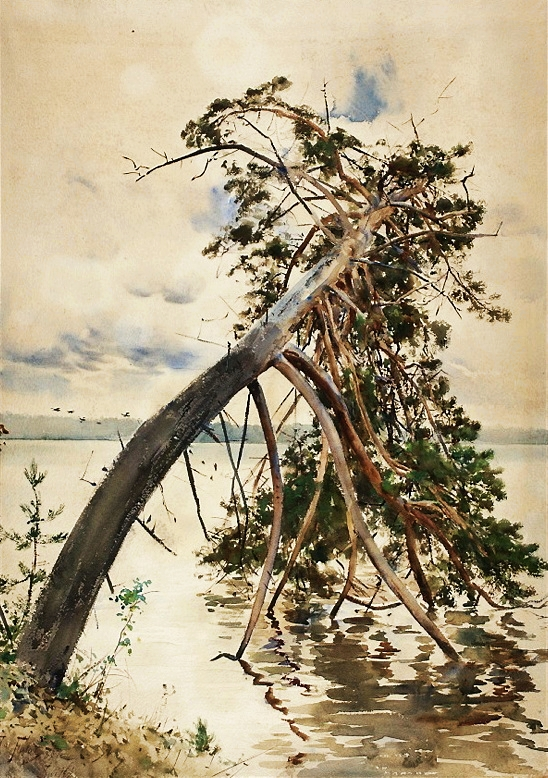
Świteź by Julian Fałat. A lake where Lange wrote many of his poems.

The Hour written in 1894, was the first prose by Lange, but the short symbolic novel was published in 1895 in the first volume of Poems. It is a story of Artemis and Auora, the two ancient goddesses who descend to Earth to witness human life. In some ways The Hour is similar to August Strindberg's 1901 drama A Dream Play and The Woman without a Shadow written by Hugo von Hofmannsthal in 1919. The novel contains many mystical fragments stylized as religious writings, a psalms, a manifesto, greek tragedy and the ode. It also connects prose with elements of poetry and drama.

One of the most representative of Lange's works is Deuteronomion, a mystical occultic poem written in Paris in 1902. It is hermetic and hard to interpret because of its many allusions to the Bible, Kabbalah, Sanskrit writings and ancient Slavic myths. It speaks of a Poet's spiritual journey to achieve an initiation that is both personal and universal. It is significant that Deuteronomion begins with the Epilogue to myself and ends with the Prologue to the unknown god.

=== Narrative poems ===
Lange inaugurated a return to narrative poetry, a form which was unprecedented in Polish literature. This form of poetry was mainly used in Romanticism (for example, by George Gordon Byron and Adam Mickiewicz) and was no longer used after the late 19th century. Therefore, Lange was probably the last and only poet who wrote narrative poems in Poland. There are:

- The Oracle, a poem based on an Indian legend
- Ilya Muromets, a poem inspired by bylina
- The Vision of Catherine of Alexandria

Lange also wrote A Song of Płanetnik, a narrative poem referring to the character of Płanetnik. In pagan Slavic mythology a płanetnik was a guardian spirit of clouds and a lonely dreamer who predicted the weather. It was thought that płanetniks were the lost souls of those who had committed suicide and victims of murder. One would call them by sprinkling flour into the wind or fire. A Song of Płanetnik by Lange tells the story of a young sensitive man who lost touch with reality and set off on the path of solitary existence.

Ni to ciało, ni to pianka Ni to wodna Świtezianka; Ni to chmurka ozłocona. Wyszła! Wyszła, dziwożona!	Ain't no body, ain't no foam ain't the Świteź of the waters ain't no gilded little cloud. Here she goes! A dziwożona!

=== Philosophy ===
In Lange's cosmogony-philosophy, he announced that the evolution of the soul is parallel to the evolution of a nation. Capitalism is the enemy of this principle because it acts against individualism, so capitalism is the ideology of the anonymous crowd. If there is no individualism among the people, then there is also no problem of "bad" versus "good". Then the world comes to disturb its own logic. According to Lange, a world that 'was being born' from ideal space, is still coming to the highest stage of evolution; sometime, it will return to its primary stage. Every step to evolution is a step toward the ideal primary. An exception to this "rule of time-line" is the person of genius, who is between the times. In Lange's philosophy, he referred to Thomas Carlyle, Giambattista Vico and Georg Wilhelm Friedrich Hegel.

Lange was interested in spiritualism and parapsychology to contain his own philosophy.

=== Critic of Romanticism ===
An important part of Lange's writing was the criticism of the legacy of romanticism in modern poetry. In 1924, he founded Astrea, a science magazine and the first forum about Polish and European romanticism. Lange rejected romantic illumination. In his view, theological truth is within the reach only of erudition, intellect and afterthought. Lange also criticised the importance of individualism and the authorial personality. Placing the poem as an artwork at the centre, as an eidos of poetry, he affirmed the poem's own existence and a clear idea of creation; therefore, he disagreed with the cult of individualism.

== Other works ==
- Vox Posthuma – a philosophical treatise about an archetypical enfant du siècle
- Godzina ("The Hour") – an occult novel about the connections between the ideal and the material world, estheticism in poetry and real life, etc.
- Pogrzeb Shelleya ("The Funeral of Shelley") – an ode to Percy Bysshe Shelley
- Księgi proroków ("Books of the Prophets") – a collection of cosmogonical poetry referred to Buddhism, Zoroastrianism and Islam
- Exotica – an historiosophical poem about the genesis of the world, God, man and woman
- Pogrobowcy ("Posthumous Verses") – a collection of early poems strongly influenced by positivism
- Rozmyślania ("Contemplations" or "Thoughts") – a philosophical poem about the dead, strongly influenced by Romanticism, Baroque poetry and decadentism
- Ballady pijackie ("Drunken Ballads") – a lyrical essay about the drugs and alcohol enjoyed by decadent poets
- Stypa ("Meeting") – a frame story about the suicide of young man after a tragic love affair
- Widzenie świętej Katarzyny ("The Vision of Saint Catherine of Alexandria") – a lyrical story about the social and metaphysical consequences of the death of God

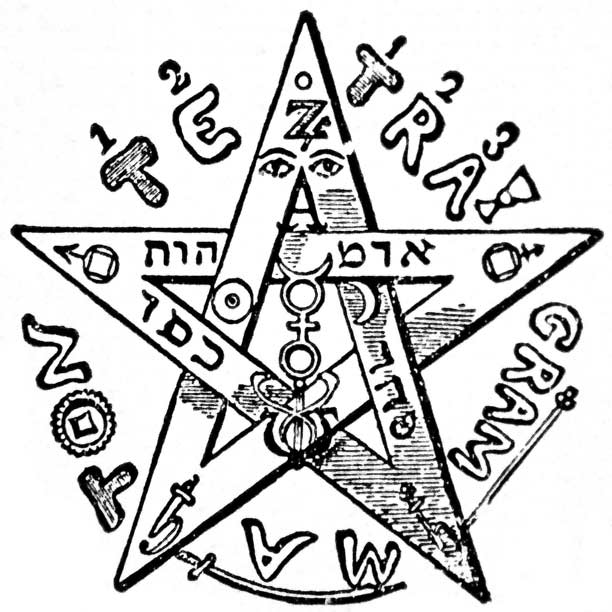
Call me Eternity in the time's turnstile, because there isn't the end of the moment when I will knock at your door

- W czwartym wymiarze ("In the Fourth Dimension") – one of the first science-fiction books in Polish literature
- Miranda – an occult novel about tragic love and the vision of an ideal woman in an ideal civilisation of Brahmins
- Róża polna ("The Wild Rose")
- Atylla ("Attila")
- Malczewski – a play about the life of the Polish Romantic poet Antoni Malczewski
- Vita Nova – a cycle of 11 philosophical poems about an ideal vision of love, pain and loneliness
- Pieśni dla przyjaciół ("Odes to Friends") – a collection of odes to Polish poets such as Jan Kasprowicz and Zenon Przesmycki

=== Selected translations ===
- English (poems from Alice in Wonderland by Lewis Carroll, poems of Lord Byron, Edgar Allan Poe, short-stories of Herbert George Wells, Paradise Lost of John Milton, Novum Organum of Francis Bacon)
- French (poems of Charles-Marie-René Leconte de Lisle, Charles Baudelaire, Théodore de Banville, selected works of Gustave Flaubert, poetry by Maurice Maeterlinck)
- Italian (works of Giovanni Pico della Mirandola, New Science of Giambattista Vico)
- German (works of Arthur Schopenhauer and Friedrich Nietzsche)

== Bibliography ==
=== Poems ===
- Sonety wedyckie (1887)
- Pogrzeb Shelleya (1890)
- Wenus żebracza (1890)
- Ballady pijackie (1895)
- Księgi proroków (1895)
- Logos (1895)
- Poezje (I – 1895; II – 1898)
- Pogrobowcom (1901)
- Świat (1901)
- Fragmenta. Poezje wybrane (1901)
- Pocałunki (1902)
- Deuteronomion (1902)
- Akteon (1903)
- Księgi bogów (1903)
- Rozmyślania (1906)
- Pierwszy dzień stworzenia (1907)
- XXVII sonetów (1914)
- Ilia Muromiec (1916)
- Trzeci dzień (1925)
- Groteski. Wiersze ironiczne (1927)
- Rozmyślania. Z nowej serii (1928)
- Gdziekolwiek jesteś (1931)
- Ostatni zbiór poezji (1931)

=== Novels and short stories ===
- Godzina (1894)
- Elfryda: nowele i fantazje (1895)
- Zbrodnia (1907)
- Dwie bajki (1910)
- Czterdzieści cztery (1910)
- Stypa (1911)
- W czwartym wymiarze (1912)
- Miranda (1924)
- Nowy Tarzan (1925)
- Róża polna (1926)
- Michałki (1926)

=== Plays ===
- Atylla (1898)
- Wenedzi (1909)
- Malczewski (1931)

=== Essays ===
- O sprzeczności sprawy żydowskiej (1890)
- Analfabetyzm i walka z ciemnotą w Królestwie Polskim (1892)
- O poezji współczesnej (1895)
- Studia z literatury francuskiej (1897)
- Studia i wrażenia (1900)
- Lord Byron (1905)
- Rzuty (1905)
- Panteon literatury wszechświatowej (1921)
- Pochodnie w mroku (1927)

== See also ==
- Young Poland
- Juliusz Słowacki
- Narrative poem
