= Miranda in Milan =

2019 LGBT fantasy novella by Katharine Duckett

- Official cover art for Miranda in Milan
- Author: Katharine Duckett
- Language: English
- Genre: Fantasy literature;
- Set in: Milan
- Publisher: Tor.com
- Publication date: 26 March 2019
- Pages: 208 (paperback)
- ISBN: 1250306329
- Website: https://www.katharineduckett.com/fiction

Miranda in Milan is a 2019 fantasy novella, the debut novella by Katharine Duckett. It is a modern-day sequel to The Tempest by William Shakespeare, and imagines the events which occur after the end of the original play. It won the 2020 Golden Crown Literary Society award for Science Fiction/Fantasy.

== Plot ==
After the events of The Tempest, Miranda does not marry Ferdinand as planned. Instead, she returns to Milan with Prospero, who has regained his position as duke. She is shunned by the castle staff; her only friend is the servant Dorothea, a Moorish witch, with whom she soon begins a romantic relationship. Miranda learns that Prospero has not given up his magic as he previously promised.

Desperate to learn why she is being shunned and about the circumstances of Prospero's fall from grace, Dorothea and Miranda use magic to invade the memories of a castle staff member. Miranda learns that after the death of her mother Beatrice, Prospero used his magic to resurrect her. This led a horrified Antonio to stage a coup against his brother.

When Miranda learns that Antonio is being held prisoner in the castle, she and Dorothea attempt to rescue him and stage another coup. Prospero catches them, but is confronted by the reanimated corpse of his wife, who has been living beneath the castle. Prospero is then killed by his brother. Miranda chooses to reject her arranged marriage with Ferdinand. She, Dorothea, and Beatrice return to the magical island where she was raised.

== Themes ==
The novella explores the ways in which imposing one's views on others can be destructive. Prospero claims that he has a right to rule over Sycorax and Caliban because he is "civilized". Meanwhile, Dorothea is forced to change her name from the original Duriya in order to fit into European civilization. The novella has been described as postcolonialist.

== Reception ==
The novella received mixed reviews from critics. Library Journal gave a positive review, praising the way in which Miranda was transformed from a secondary character into a fully-realized heroine. The Lambda Literary Foundation praised the novel's lesbian romance, calling it "femslash for Shakespeare." They also praised Prospero's characterization, calling him "utterly believable". A Locus Magazine review praised the novel's "crisp prose" and complex themes.

NPR wrote a mixed review which called the debut "solid", praising its treatment of women and the believability of the novella's original characters. However, the same review criticized the way in which Ferdinand is written out of the story, as well as the way in which Caliban's attempted rape of Miranda is "handwave[d] away". Publishers Weekly criticized the power differential inherent in Miranda's and Dorothea's romance, feeling that it undermined the novella's postcolonialist themes. Kirkus Reviews considered the novel to have a "promising premise", but overall faulted Duckett's "characters [who] lack depth" and "pedestrian language".

The novella won the 2020 Golden Crown Literary Society award for Science Fiction/Fantasy, tying with three other works.
