= Bouře =

Bouře, Op. 40, is an 1894 Czech-language opera by Zdeněk Fibich in 3 acts to a libretto by Jaroslav Vrchlický after the play The Tempest by William Shakespeare.

== Recordings ==
Bouře Supraphon – DV 5753, 1961

Tracklist
A1 "Ach, Prosím Otče, Bouři Začaruj"
A2 "Tiše, Tiše, Hoši Milí"
A3 "Již Ruka Moje Zmdlela"
B1 "Váš Trest Již Začal"
B2 "Můj Čacký Hochu"

=== Arias ===
- Act 3: "Tak, ostrove muj, sbohem bu'!", Zdeněk Otava (baritone), Prague Radio Symphony Orchestra, Frantisek Dyk. Recorded: 30 June 1952, Czech Radio
