= Zenon Przesmycki =

Polish poet, translator and art critic

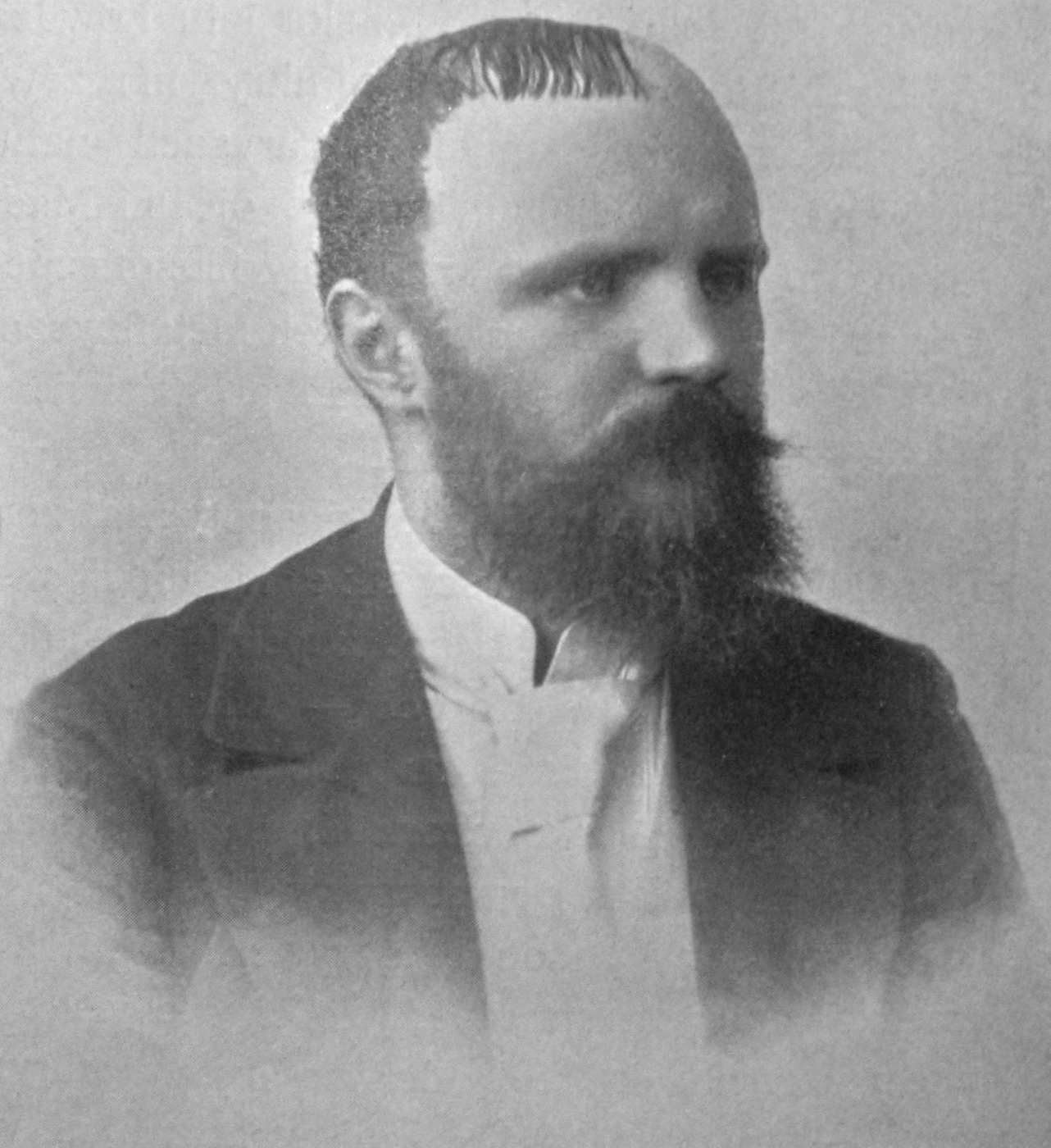
Zenon Przesmycki

Zenon Franciszek Przesmycki (pen name Miriam; 22 December 1861, Radzyń Podlaski – 17 October 1944, Warsaw) was a Polish poet, translator and an art critic of the literary period of Młoda Polska, who studied law in Italy, France and England; in years of 1887 and 1888, he served as the editor-in-chief of the Warsaw magazine Życie (Life), an influential first-ever publication on modernism in Poland.

== Professional career ==
Zenon Przesmycki was a member of the prestigious Polish Academy of Literature. He first discovered and popularised the work of Polish national poet Cyprian Norwid, who was almost forgotten in exile. Przesmycki published the art magazine Chimera (1901–1908) featuring the works of Norwid. One of his closest friends was Bolesław Leśmian also involved there. Another friend of his, poet Antoni Lange, wrote an ode to him, in a series of Odes to Friends (" Pieśni dla przyjaciół").

Przesmycki published many translations of renowned French poets, including Charles Baudelaire and Paul Verlaine, as well as Edgar Allan Poe and Algernon Charles Swinburne from English. His own 1892 translation of Arthur Rimbaud's The Drunken Boat (Le Bateau ivre) became a literary event in partitioned Poland.

In the interwar period, Przesmycki served as Minister of Culture and Art (1919).

== See also ==
- Polish literature
