= Michelle Cliff =

American novelist

- Cliff in the 1980s
- Born: 2 November 1946; Kingston, Jamaica
- Died: 12 June 2016; Santa Cruz
- Education: Wagner College, University of London, Curtis High School
- Occupation: Writer
- Employers: Emory University; P. N. Review; The American Poetry Review; Trinity College; Vermont College of Fine Arts (1983–); W. W. Norton & Company
- Notable work: Abeng (1985); No Telephone to Heaven (1987); Free Enterprise (2004)
- Partner: Adrienne Rich

Michelle Carla Cliff (2 November 1946 – 12 June 2016) was a Jamaican-American author whose notable works included Abeng (1985), No Telephone to Heaven (1987), and Free Enterprise (1993).

In addition to novels, Cliff also wrote short stories, prose poems, and literary criticism. Her works explore the identity problems that stem from postcolonialism, race and gender constructs. A historical revisionist, many of Cliff's works seek to advance an alternative view of history against established mainstream narratives. Cliff identified as biracial and bisexual, and had both Jamaican and American citizenship. Her writings focused often on Caribbean identity.

== Life and education ==
Cliff was born in Kingston, Jamaica, in 1946 and moved with her family to New York City three years later. Cliff has described her family as "Jamaica white", Jamaicans of mostly European ancestry, but later began to identify as a light-skinned Black woman. Responding to a description of her in the anthology Her True-True Name which called her light-skinned enough to be functionally white, Cliff rejected the notion that she has "a white outlook just because [she] look[s] white." She moved back to Jamaica in 1956 and attended St Andrew High School, where she began writing, before returning to New York City in 1960. She was educated at Wagner College where she graduated with a Bachelor of Arts in European history, then at the Warburg Institute of the University of London where she did postgraduate work in Renaissance studies, focusing on the Italian Renaissance.

Cliff later lived in Santa Cruz, California, with her partner, the poet Adrienne Rich. The two had been together since 1976; Rich died in 2012.

Cliff died of liver failure on 12 June 2016.

== Career ==
Cliff's first published work was the book Claiming an Identity They Taught Me to Despise, which covered the ways she experienced racism and prejudice. In 1981, Cliff became an associate of the Women's Institute for Freedom of the Press.

She was a contributor to the 1983 Black feminist anthology Home Girls.

In 1984, Cliff published Abeng, a semi-autobiographical novel that explores topics of female sexual subjectivity and Jamaican identity. Next was The Land of Look Behind: Prose and Poetry (1985), which uses the Jamaican folk world, its landscape and culture to examine identity.

Cliff's second novel, No Telephone to Heaven, was published in 1987. It continues the story of Clare Savage from Abeng, exploring the need to reclaim a suppressed African past.

Her works were also in a collection edited by Gloria Anzaldúa called Making Face, Making Soul: Creative and Critical Writing by Feminists of Color (1990).

From 1990 on, Cliff's work took a more global focus, especially with her first collection of short stories, Bodies of Water. In 1993 she published her third novel, Free Enterprise, and in 1998 she published another collection of short stories, The Store of a Million Items. Both works continue her pursuit of readdressing historical injustices.

She continued to work throughout the 2000s, releasing several collections of essays and short stories including If I Could Write This in Fire (2008) and Everything Is Now: New and Collected Short Stories (2009). Her final novel, Into The Interior, was published in 2010.

Cliff translated into English the works of several writers, poets and creatives such as Argentinean poet Alfonsina Storni; Spanish poet Federico García Lorca and Italian poet Pier Paolo Pasolini.

She held academic positions at several colleges including Trinity College and Emory University.

== Works ==
=== Fiction ===
- 2010: Into the Interior (University of Minnesota Press). Novel
- 2009: Everything is Now: New and Collected Stories (University of Minnesota Press). Short stories
- 1998: The Store of a Million Items (Houghton Mifflin Company). Short stories
- 1993: Free Enterprise: A Novel of Mary Ellen Pleasant (E. P. Dutton). Novel
- 1990: Bodies of Water (Dutton). Short stories
- 1987: No Telephone to Heaven (Dutton). Novel (sequel to Abeng)
- 1984: Abeng (Penguin Books). Novel

=== Prose poetry ===
- 1985: The Land of Look Behind: Prose and Poetry (Firebrand Books).
- 1980: Claiming an Identity They Taught Me to Despise (Persephone Press).

=== Editor ===
- 1982: Lillian Smith, The Winner Names the Age: A Collection of Writings (W. W. Norton & Company).

=== Other ===
- 2008: If I Could Write This in Fire (University of Minnesota Press). Non-fiction collection
- 1982: "If I Could Write This in Fire I Would Write This in Fire", in Barbara Smith (ed.), Home Girls (Kitchen Table: Women of Color Press).
- 1994: "History as Fiction, Fiction as History", Ploughshares, Fall 1994; 20(2–3): 196–202.
- 1990: "Object into Subject: Some Thoughts on the Work of Black Women's Artists," in Gloria Anzaldúa (ed.), Making Face, Making Soul/Haciendo Caras: Creative and Critical Perspectives by Women of Color (Aunt Lute Books).
