= No Telephone to Heaven =

1987 novel by Michelle Cliff

- First edition
- Author: Michelle Cliff
- Language: English
- Genre: Novel
- Publisher: Dutton Adult
- Publication date: July 1987
- Publication place: Jamaica
- Media type: Print (Hardcover & Paperback)
- Pages: 211 pp

No Telephone to Heaven, the sequel to Abeng (novel), is the second novel published by Jamaican-American author Michelle Cliff. The novel continues the story of Clare Savage, Cliff's semi-autobiographical character from Abeng, through a set of flashbacks that recount Clare's adolescence and young adulthood as she moves from Jamaica to the United States, then to England, and finally back to Jamaica. First published in 1987, the book has received attention for its articulation of the paradoxes of history and identity after, and counter to, the experience of colonization.

== Plot summary ==
The novel begins with a small group of armed militants, a much older Clare Savage among them, traveling through Jamaica's remote Cockpit Country. The militants have settled on land once owned by Clare's grandmother Miss Mattie, where they train together and grow food as well as produce illegal drugs.

The second chapter tells the story of Paul H., who is initially at a party with Harry/Harriet, the gay and feminine half-brother to one of Paul's friends. Paul returns home after a late night to find a horrific scene: his family and all of their servants have been murdered with a machete. He stumbles upon Christopher, another servant employed by Paul's parents, and enlists his help in dealing with the bodies and the burials. But we learn in flashback that Christopher, an orphan whose family has served Paul's parents for generations, committed the murders when he went to ask a favor from Paul's father—to help Christopher find where his grandmother is buried so that he could give her spirit rest—and was turned down. Christopher had been waiting for Paul, and kills him before Paul figures out what has happened.

The story then shifts time periods to 1960, when Boy Savage, Clare's father, is immigrating with his family to the United States. Kitty Savage, Clare's mother, is not happy about moving away from all she has ever known, but she resigns herself to quiet depression upon departure from Jamaica and arrival in Miami. Boy purchases a used car and the family travels north to New York City. While traveling through the state of Georgia, Boy attempts to get a room in a segregated motel; the innkeeper suspects that he is black, but Boy is able to convince the innkeeper that he is white by telling him that his ancestors once owned plantations. When the family arrives in New York City they go to stay with Winston and Grace, relatives from Kitty's mother's side of the family. Soon, however, they stop any contact with Kitty's relatives in order to fully assume a white identity. Boy eventually takes a job driving a laundry truck and Kitty goes to work in the office of his employer. Fed up with the constant racism she encounters, Kitty decides to slip messages into the linens before they are delivered—messages such as “Marcus Garvey was right” and “America is cruel. Consider kindness for a change” aimed at the white customers. Mr. B, Kitty's employer, finds out about the messages and fires two of the black workers, Georgia and Virginia; Mr. B suspects that they were the ones slipping in the messages. Kitty quits her job, then takes Clare's younger sister Jennie and returns to Jamaica.

After her mother and sister leave, Clare becomes increasingly lonely, since she has not yet started school and is not allowed to leave the house by herself. She stays home and watches movies and remembers the first American she met—a white teacher at her Catholic school in Jamaica who taught lessons on the American Civil War, took the girls to see the “documentary” Gone With the Wind, and extolled the benefits of racial hierarchies. When Clare begins school in New York she is told that, despite her intelligence, she will be held back for a year because children from Third World countries develop differently from American children. Boy tries to convince the school that Clare is white, but the school does not believe him, nor do they have a category for biracial students—a student is either black or white. Five years pass, and Kitty is still living with Clare's younger sister in Jamaica. Clare, who is now a sophomore in college, comes home one evening to find her father crying. He tells her that her mother has died and later that her sister Jennie will be coming to live with them. After Jennie moves in, Clare borrows some money from her uncle Fredrick and leaves home for England.

Upon arriving in London Clare finds a room to rent and spends some time visiting various museums, browsing bookshops and generally getting to know England. She eventually becomes a legal resident and enrolls at the University of London to study art history. After some time at the university Clare decides to take her uncle up on his invitation to come back to Jamaica, where she attends the same party as Paul H. before he was killed by Christopher, and meets Harry/Harriet. Clare and Harry/Harriet become good friends while Clare is in Kingston, Jamaica, spending time together first in a Spanish galleon-themed bar and then on a beach discussing the history and current social conditions of Jamaica. The two keep in touch, via letters, after Clare returns to England. Upon her return, Clare witnesses a National Front march and is deeply disturbed by the aggression and racism on display on her college campus. She tries to explain why she is so disturbed to her friend Liz, but gets nowhere and ends up feeling isolated and alone.

In the next chapter Clare meets up with Bobby, a Vietnam War veteran who has a wound on his ankle that, despite Clare's best efforts, will not heal. The two of them leave London together and travel around Europe. While traveling she receives a letter from Harry/Harriet telling her that her aunt and uncle in Kingston are moving to Miami and leaving her grandmother's old place in the country to her alone. Clare continues to travel around Europe with Bobby, who is still struggling mentally and physically with the after-effects of the war, until one day he disappears without warning.

Clare waits for Bobby but eventually decides it is time for her to return to Jamaica. Clare becomes increasingly ill upon her return and discovers that she has an infection in her womb that will most likely leave her sterile. After she recovers, Harry/Harriet suggests that the two of them travel to Clare's grandmother's farm. Once there, Clare finds the river where she used to bathe and with Harry/Harriet takes a bath there for the first time in twenty years.

In chapter nine we learn that Christopher was never arrested for his crime, and so has been left to wander the back alleys of Kingston's ghettos. He becomes known throughout the city as the watchman of Kingston—a sort of mad prophet or mendicant, and becomes the subject of a reggae song. On the night of a terrible fire where many old women are burned alive, alluded to earlier in a letter from Harry/Harriet to Clare, Christopher shows up at the scene shouting prophecies at the top of his lungs.

After visiting the countryside Clare learns of the poor economic conditions in Jamaica. Harry/Harriet takes her to a small tenement room in Kingston so that she can join a clandestine militant revolutionary group. She is interrogated about her motives and convinces the militants that she is genuine in her desire to make a violent revolution on behalf of the poor and oppressed in Jamaica. In her answers Clare connects the experiences of her life and travels to the oppressed condition of Jamaica—a former colony, part of the Third World. Finally, Clare recalls that in one of her final letters before her death, her mother told her to help her people in whatever way that she could; this becomes her ultimate justification for joining the group.

In the final chapter of the book, a film crew has come to Jamaica to make a movie about the Maroons, and they have hired Christopher, “de Watchman”, to play a small role. Clare and the militants decide to massacre the civilian crew, but when they begin their attack it is apparent that someone has sold them out. Clare and the rest of the militants are killed in a counter-terrorism operation.

== Main characters ==
- Clare Savage: protagonist, light-skinned, Jamaican; the character around whom the novel revolves; eventually takes part in a guerrilla movement
- Kitty Savage: Clare's mother, slightly darker complexion, has a deep love for Jamaica
- Boy Savage: Clare's father, has very light skin (can pass as white), proudly proclaims his British heritage
- Jennie Savage: Clare's younger sister, has a complexion closer to her mother's
- Fredrick: Clare's uncle, Kitty's brother, helps Clare travel to London and support herself once at the university
- Harry/Harriet: Clare's close friend, encourages her to come to Jamaica and helps her join the revolutionaries
- Christopher, aka “De Watchman”: servant, or “yardboy”, who kills his employers, legendary figure in Kingston folklore, hired by the film crew to play a small role in their movie
- Bobby: black Vietnam veteran, travels around Europe with Clare, has a wound on his ankle that will not heal
