= University of California Press =

American publishing house

- Parent company: University of California
- Founded: 1893
- Country of origin: United States
- Headquarters location: Berkeley, California
- Distribution: Ingram Publisher Services (US); John Wiley & Sons (UK); Footprint Books (Australia)
- Publication types: Books, journals
- Official website: ucpress.edu

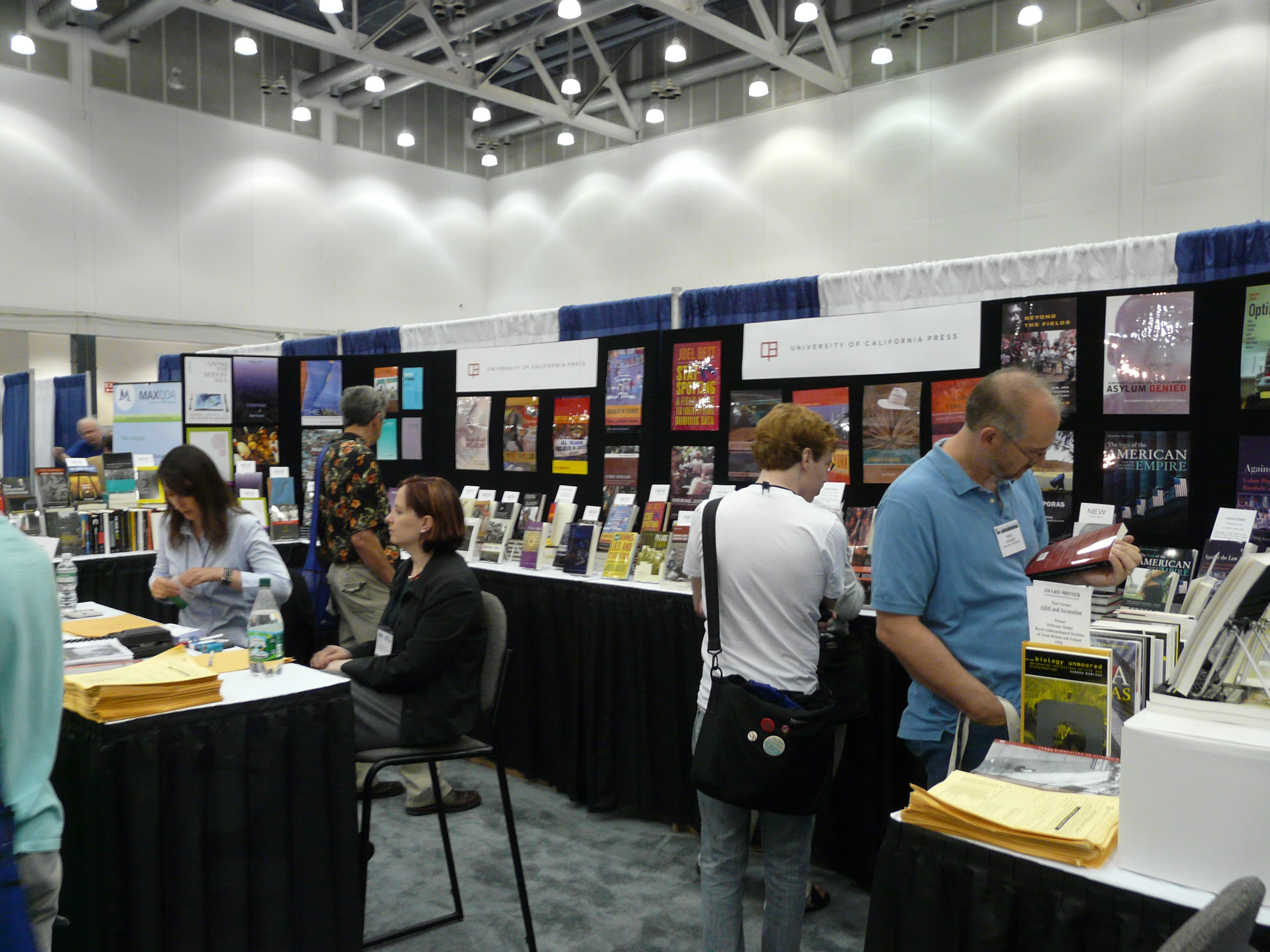
2008 conference booth

The University of California Press, otherwise known as UC Press, is a publishing house associated with the University of California that engages in academic publishing. It was founded in 1893 to publish scholarly and scientific works by faculty of the University of California, established 25 years earlier in 1868.

As the publishing arm of the University of California system, the press publishes over 250 new books and almost four dozen multi-issue journals annually, in the humanities, social sciences, and natural sciences, and maintains approximately 4,000 book titles in print. It is also the digital publisher of Collabra and Luminos open access (OA) initiatives.

The press has its administrative office in downtown Oakland, California, an editorial branch office in Los Angeles, and a sales office in New York City, and distributes through marketing offices in Great Britain, Asia, Australia, and Latin America. A Board consisting of senior officers of the University of California, holds responsibility for the operations of the press, and authorizes and approves all manuscripts for publication. The Editorial Committee consists of distinguished faculty members representing the university's nine campuses.

The press commissioned as its corporate typeface University of California Old Style from type designer Frederic Goudy from 1936 to 1938, although it no longer always uses the design.

University of California Press joined the Association of American Publishers trade organization in the Hachette v. Internet Archive lawsuit which resulted in the removal of access to over 500,000 books from global readers.

== Notable books ==
- Language as Symbolic Action, Kenneth Burke (1966)
- The Teachings of Don Juan: A Yaqui Way of Knowledge, Carlos Castaneda (1968)
- Technicians of the Sacred: A Range of Poetries from Africa, America, Asia, Europe and Oceania, Jerome Rothenberg (1968; 50th anniversary edition 2017)
- The Mysterious Stranger, Mark Twain (definitive edition) (1969, based on work first published in 1916)
- Basic Color Terms: Their Universality and Evolution (1969)
- The Making of a Counter Culture, Theodore Roszak (1970)
- Self-Consuming Artifacts: The Experience of Seventeenth-Century Literature, Stanley Fish (1972)
- The Ancient Economy, Moses I. Finley (1973)
- Joan of Arc: The Image of Female Heroism, Marina Warner (1981)
- Caring: A Feminine Approach to Ethics and Moral Education, Nel Noddings (1984, 2nd edition 2003)
- Strong Democracy: Participatory Politics for a New Age, Benjamin R. Barber (1984)
- Art in the San Francisco Bay Area, Thomas Albright (1985)
- Religious Experience, Wayne Proudfoot (1985)
- Perfecting Women, Barbara D. Metcalf (1992)
- The War Within: America's Battle over Vietnam, Tom Wells (1994)
- George Grosz: An Autobiography, George Grosz (translated by Nora Hodges) (published 1998, written in 1946, translated in 1955)
- Disposable People: New Slavery in the Global Economy, Kevin Bales (1999)
- Mama Lola: A Vodou Priestess in Brooklyn, Karen McCarthy Brown (2001)
- A Culture of Conspiracy: Apocalyptic Visions in Contemporary America, Michael Barkun (2003)
- Beyond Chutzpah: On the Misuse of Anti-Semitism and the Abuse of History, Norman G. Finkelstein (2005)
- Autobiography of Mark Twain: Volume One, Mark Twain (2010)
- Revival from Below, Brannon D. Ingram (2018)
- Overcoming Bias Habits, William T. L. Cox (2026)

== Open access (OA) programs at UC Press ==
Collabra (journals)

Collabra is University of California Press's open access journal program. The Collabra program currently publishes two open access journals, Collabra: Psychology and Elementa: Science of the Anthropocene, with plans for continued expansion and journal acquisition.

Luminos (monographs)

Luminos is University of California Press's open access response to the challenged monograph landscape. With the same high standards for selection, peer review, production, and marketing as its traditional book publishing program, Luminos is a transformative model, built as a partnership where costs and benefits are shared.

UC Press E-Books Collection, 1982-2004

The UC Press E-Books Collection, 1982-2004, of which, more than 700 of the almost 2,000 books of topics, including art, science, history, music, religion, and fiction, are available to the public. Access to the entire collection of electronic books is open to all University of California faculty, staff, and students.

BOOM California

BOOM California is a free refereed online publication of the University of California Press.

== Notable series ==
The University of California Press re-printed a number of novels under the California Fiction series from 1996 to 2001. These titles were selected for their literary merit and for their illumination of California history and culture.

- The Ford by Mary Austin
- Thieves' Market by A.I. Bezzerides
- Disobedience by Michael Drinkard
- Words of My Roaring by Ernest J. Finney
- Skin Deep by Guy Garcia
- Fat City by Leonard Gardiner
- Chez Chance by Jay Gummerman
- Continental Drift by James D. Houston
- The Vineyard by Idwal Jones
- In the Heart of the Valley of Love by Cynthia Kadohata
- Always Coming Home by Ursula K. Le Guin
- The Valley of the Moon by Jack London
- Home and Away by Joanne Meschery
- Bright Web in the Darkness by Alexander Saxton
- Golden Days by Carolyn See
- Oil! by Upton Sinclair
- Understand This by Jervey Tervalon
- Ghost Woman by Lawrence Thornton
- Who Is Angelina? by Al Young

== See also ==
- List of English-language book publishing companies
- List of university presses
- California Digital Library
