= Nadja Skaljic =

Lawyer

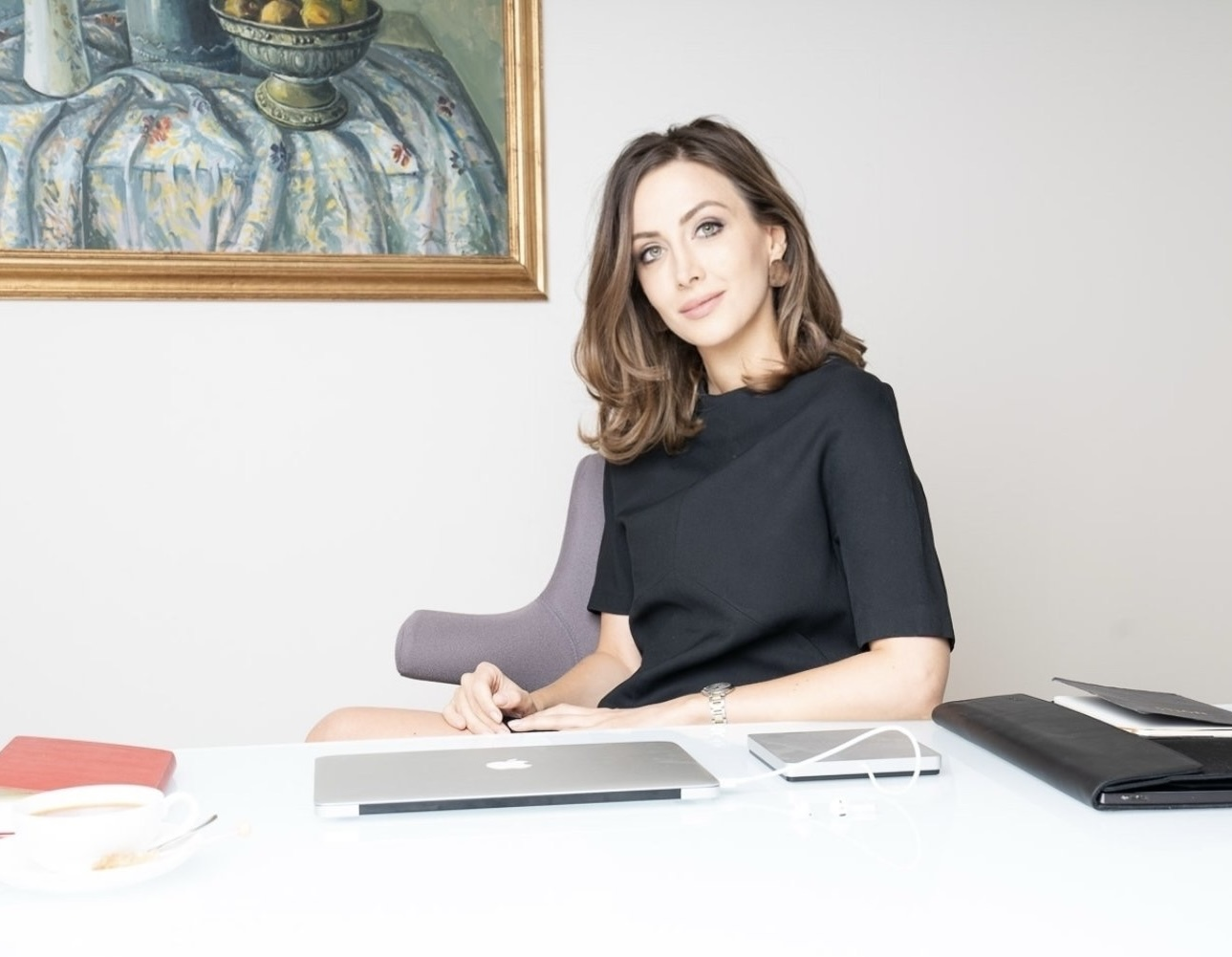
Nadja Skaljic Lawyer and systems thinker Nadja Skaljic (2022)
- Education: Balliol College, Oxford; Fletcher School of Law and Diplomacy at Tufts University; Harvard Law School; Harvard Kennedy School
- Occupation: Lawyer · Board Director · Executive
- Known for: British delegation to the European Union during Brexit; Member of Club of Rome and World Economic Forum's Global Foresight Network

Nadja Skaljic is a lawyer, corporate strategist, and systems thinker focused on next-generation initiatives spanning law, finance, emerging technologies, and sustainability. She is an Expert Member of the World Economic Forum's Global Foresight Network.

She is best known for her roles as Senior Policy Adviser to the British Delegation to the European Union in Brussels during and after Brexit, and prosecuting war crimes and genocide at the UN International Criminal Tribunal for the former Yugoslavia (ICTY) in The Hague. She is a member of the Club of Rome, a think tank working at the forefront of systems change.

A legal executive with a commercial lens, Skaljic designs frameworks that combine geopolitical insight and risk intelligence to drive enterprise growth, value creation, and planetary resilience.

Skaljic's career spans senior roles across government, international organisations, and the corporate sector.

== Career ==
Skaljic began her career in international law at the Prosecutor's Office of the United Nations International Criminal Tribunal for the former Yugoslavia (ICTY) in The Hague. She contributed to the landmark genocide case against Radovan Karadžić, who was convicted on 10 of 11 counts, including war crimes, genocide, and crimes against humanity. Karadzic was initially sentenced to 40 years' imprisonment, a sentence later increased to life. The case is regarded as one of the most complex and high-profile prosecutions in international criminal law, setting key precedents for holding heads of state and senior officials accountable for mass atrocities. Skaljic later served as a Senior Policy Advisor in the European Parliament in Brussels, before and during Brexit, where she played an important role in shaping the EU's green and digital policy frameworks, while also managing strategic portfolios in foreign affairs and defence.

On her work for the British at the European Union before and during Brexit, she said:

"Much has been written about the causes of Brexit, often in frustratingly simplistic terms. My firsthand experience of the E.U. across the continent in 2015 revealed an enterprise struggling to deliver tangible benefits for Europeans—a perception that, in many ways, endures. Yet, there is reason for optimism. Initiatives such as the European Green Deal, alongside new digital and privacy agendas, offer a chance to reinvigorate the project."

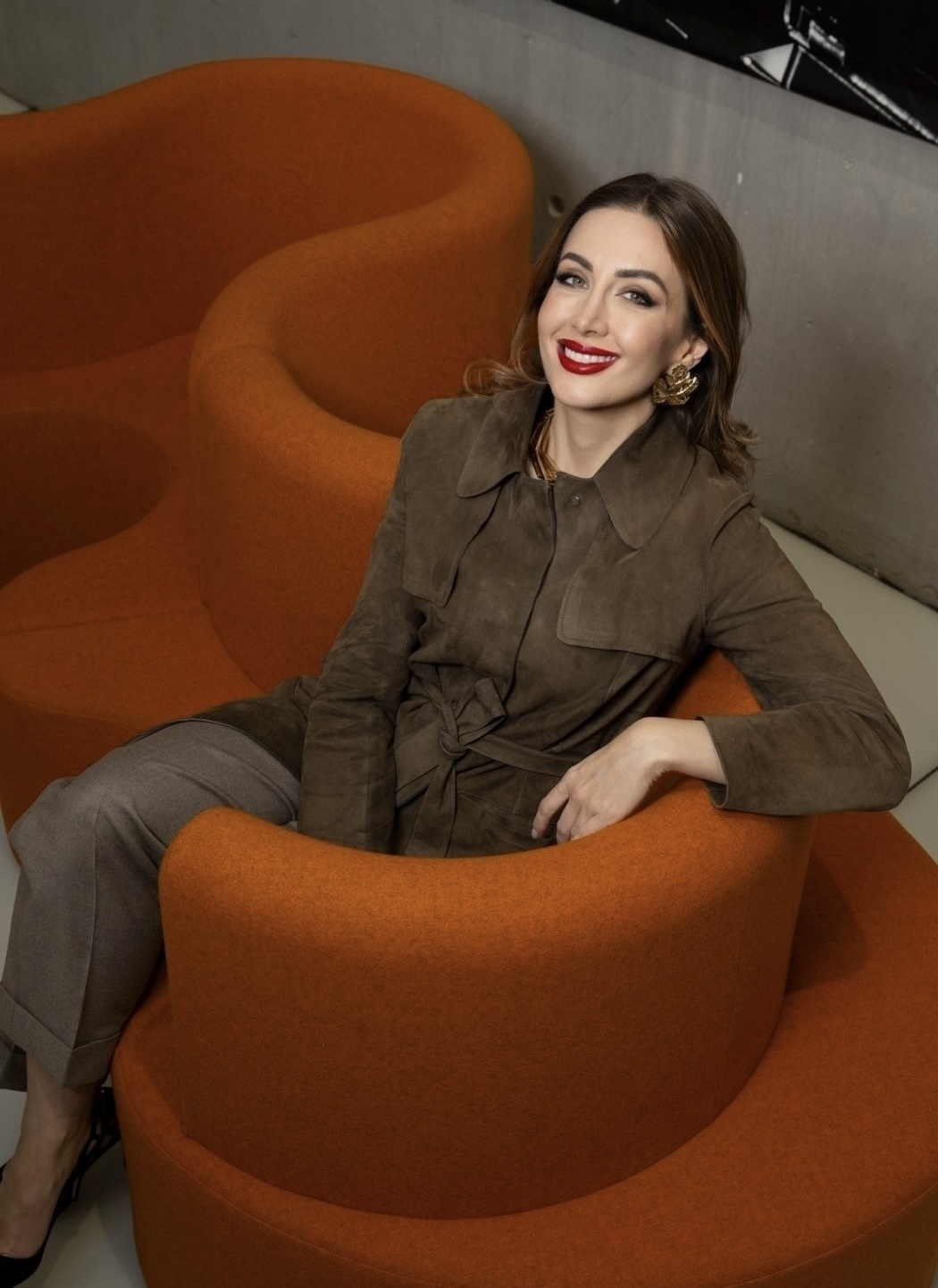
Nadja Skaljic speaking to Swiss media (2025).

She also served as Senior Fellow for Europe at the Carnegie Council for Ethics in International Affairs in New York, working with Michael Ignatieff, her Harvard mentor on several global initiatives, which culminated in the book The Ordinary Virtues: Moral Order in a Divided World.

Following Brexit, Skaljic transitioned into the private sector in Switzerland, taking on executive and board roles. She is Chief Legal and Strategy Officer at a Swiss innovation company, bringing together capital, experimental regulation and technology to create products for an inclusive and sustainable regenerative economy.

== Corporate and Philanthropic roles ==
Skaljic holds board positions with a range of corporate and non-profit organisations in Europe and the United States.

Her corporate directorships include a clinical-stage biotechnology company based in Sweden and a Silicon Valley longevity firm founded by former Google artificial intelligence engineers. Skaljic also serves on the Vision Board of the reState Foundation, which focuses on the future of governance and stewarding new civilisational paradigms, alongside Vitalik Buterin, co-founder of Ethereum, and Audrey Tang, the Taiwanese civic hacker and technologist, among other personalities. With a group of international experts — including Ambassadors Beth Van Schaak, François Croquette, and Stephen Rapp — Skaljic serves on the advisory board of InterJust. The organisation, a Clooney Foundation for Justice spinoff works to strengthen universal jurisdiction frameworks, aiming to improve access to justice for survivors and advance accountability for perpetrators of international crimes.

She is a Fellow of the European Law Institute representing Switzerland in matters concerning the development of European legal frameworks. She is Fellow of the Royal Society of Arts (RSA) in London, and holds memberships with the International Bar Association (IBA) and the European Society of International Law (ESIL).

Skaljic is also a consortium member of the Swiss Impact & Prosperity Initiative (SIPI), an initiative of the B Lab Switzerland.

== Education ==
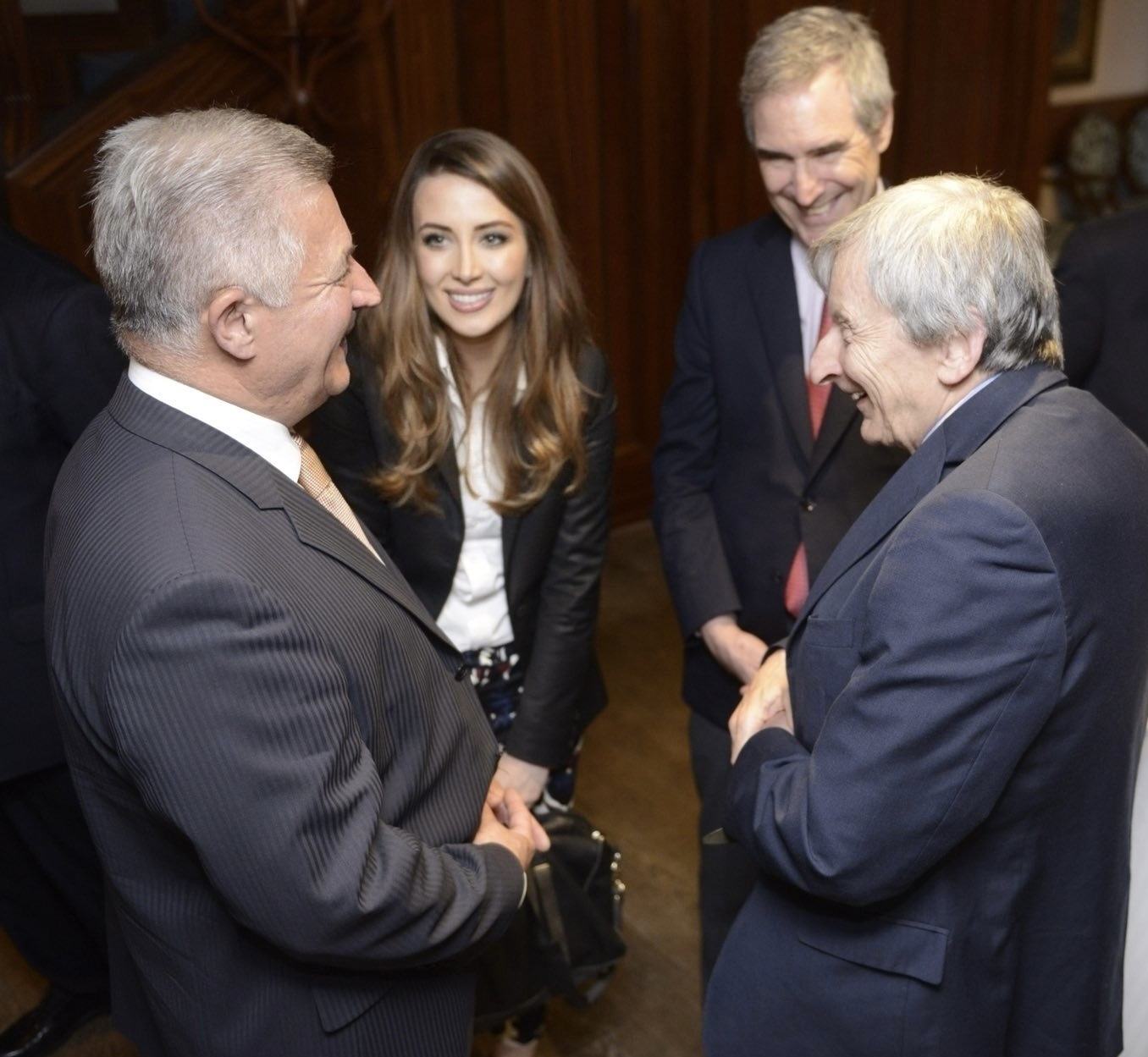
Nadja Skaljic at the Carnegie Council with Michael Ignatieff and Sir Adam Roberts, President of the British Academy (2009–2013).

Skaljic earned an advanced law degree from Balliol College at the University of Oxford as a Weidenfeld-Hoffmann Scholar, a fellowship granted in recognition of exceptional academic achievement and leadership promise. Skaljic serves on the board of the Weidenfeld-Hoffmann Trust, established by the late George Weidenfeld with Andre Hoffmann and global partner organisations.

Skaljic also holds advanced degrees in international law, foreign affairs, and public policy from The Fletcher School of Law and Diplomacy, Harvard Kennedy School of Government, and Harvard Law School.

== Personal and Family Life ==
Nadja Skaljic was born in Sarajevo, before the breakup of the former Yugoslavia.

As a child, she lived through the Siege of Sarajevo. The experience compelled her to become an international lawyer and shaped her enduring commitment to accountability for mass atrocities and the promotion of post-conflict reconciliation.

Skaljic lives and works in Geneva, Switzerland. Alongside her primary work, she paints and collects art exploring themes of pluriversality and regeneration, often in dialogue with technology.

== Published works ==
Skaljic specialises in legal innovation, ecological finance, and market dynamics. She has authored essays and analytical reports for outlets such as Bloomberg, Devex, and the Club of Rome, and has been featured in The Times and Forbes.

Her substantive book contributions include "Rescuing Human Rights: A Radically Moderate Approach" (Cambridge University Press, 2019) with Hurst Hannum and The Ordinary Virtues: Moral Order in a Divided World (Harvard University Press, 2017) with Michael Ignatieff.
