= Religious Experience (book) =

1985 book by Wayne Proudfoot

- Author: Wayne Proudfoot
- Language: English
- Publisher: University of California Press
- Publication date: 1985
- Publication place: United States

Religious Experience is a 1985 book by Wayne Proudfoot, published by University of California Press. It received the American Academy of Religion Award in 1986, one year after publication. Its area of exploration (i.e., the academic study of religious experience) is along the lines of that explored by William James in The Varieties of Religious Experience. One of the key questions routinely raised by such academic study is whether religious experience of individuals reflects a truly hidden spiritual reality or merely physiological changes of state.

== List of reviews ==
- Review: "Explaining the Unexplainable: Wayne Proudfoot's 'Religious Experience'", G. William Barnard, Journal of the American Academy of Religion, Vol. 60, No. 2, (Summer, 1992), pp.231-256

Excerpt: "Religion for Proudfoot is primarily a cultural, public, accessible phenomenon. According to him, those who claim that religious experiences are private, personal, or interior are mistaken. They simply do not understand the true nature of emotions and an undue respect for our ability to make authoritative judgements based on introspective evidence. ...[Proudfoot] neglects to mention that the Schachter and Singer experiment, though acknowledged as a classic because of its extensive influence on subsequent cognitive models of emotion, is considered, at best, controversial, and more seriously, has been judged by many to be methodologically unsound and unwarranted in its conclusions. Although Proudfoot in a footnote (242) mentions that some criticisms of the Schachter and Singer experiment do exist in the literature, the reader, despite the footnote, is left with the impression that what criticisms exist are inconsequential, and that the conclusions reached by the Schachter and Singer experiment are still those most widely accepted in the psychological community. ... Perhaps it is inevitable, even necessary, that as students of religion, we will choose which methodological approach we find most adequate and fruitful. I would like to propose that a modified Jamesian approach is, in the end, far superior to Proudfoot's solution. James's willingness to entertain seriously the possibility of a transcultural reality, combined with his awareness of the tentative nature of every explanatory attempt, and his emphasis on the worth of attempting normative assessments of different religious worldviews and practices, makes his methodology a far more attractive and viable option than the methodology offered by Wayne Proudfoot in Religious Experience."

- "Religious Experience by Wayne Proudfoot", Kusumita P. Pedersen, Philosophy East and West, Vol. 38, Num. 2, April 1988, pp. 209–212.

Excerpt: "Finally, it is welcome indeed to have a philosopher of Proudfoot's ability make such a strong case for the cognitive content of religious consciousness by demonstrating the central role of judgment and explanation in religious experience."
