= Peter Vladimirov =

Soviet diplomat and journalist

Pyotr Parfenovich Vladimirov
- Pyotr Vlasov c. 1946
- Born: 1905; Khrenovoe, Voronezh Governorate, Russian Empire
- Died: 10 September 1953 (aged c. 48); Moscow, Soviet Union
- Education: Moscow Institute of Oriental Studies
- Occupations: Diplomat and journalist
- Known for: The Vladimirov Diaries

Peter or Pyotr Parfenovich Vlasov, better known under his pen name Vladimirov, (Russian: Пётр Парфёнович Влади́миров/Влáсов; 1905 – 10 September 1953) was a Soviet diplomat and journalist. He is best known for The Vladimirov Diaries, in which he recounted the events in Yan'an during the Second World War, particularly information on Mao Zedong. The diary criticized Mao's government, and was heavily edited for Soviet propaganda purposes.

From May 1938 through to November 1945, he served as a correspondent for the Telegraph Agency of the Soviet Union (TASS). At the same time, from May 1942 to 1945, Vladimirov also acted as a liaison officer for Comintern to the headquarters of the Chinese Communist Party in Yan'an, the capital of the Yan'an Soviet.

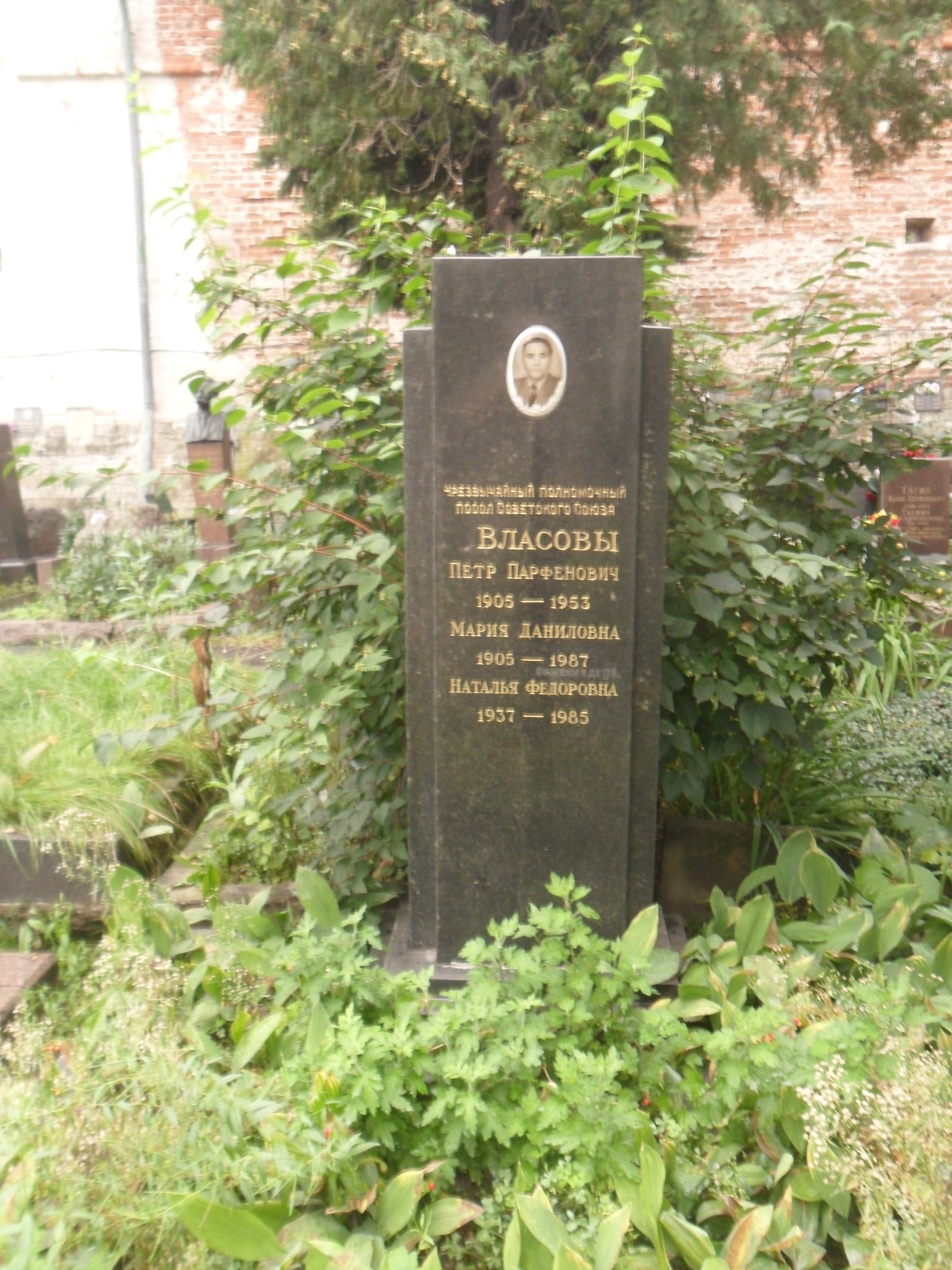
Vlasov’s grave at Novodevichy Cemetery.

Vladimirov's last appointment was as a Soviet ambassador to Burma in 1952, but due to an illness which eventually led to his death, he had never taken up the position.

Vlasov was married to Maria Danilovna Vlasova; they had two sons, Boris and Yury. Yury became an Olympic weightlifting champion and a prominent writer; he published his father's diaries in 1973, twenty years after his death. According to Philip Short, this was done "on instructions from the CPSU Central Committee Secretariat, 'in the context of worsening relations with China', and underwent high-level editing and censorship. Its purpose was propagandistic. No contemporary diary ever existed, but it was based, at least in part, on Vlasov's radio messages to Moscow, conserved in the Soviet archives." Yury would also go on to claim that his father was poisoned "on the orders of" Soviet secret police chief Lavrentiy Beria.
