= Yan'an Soviet =

Chinese Communist Party-governed area (1937–1950)

Shaan–Gan–Ning Border Region 陝甘寧邊區
- Rump state of the Chinese Soviet Republic
- 1937–1950
- Map of Shaan-Gan-Ning Border Region.
- Capital: Yan'an (1937–47, 1948–49); Xi'an (1949–50)
- Demonym: Chinese
- Area
  - 1937: 134,500 km^{2} (51,900 sq mi)
- Population
  - 1937: 1,500,000
- Government
  - Type: Socialist republic
- Chairman
  - 1937–1948: Lin Boqu
- Deputy Chairman
  - 1937–1938: Zhang Guotao
  - 1938–1945: Gao Zili
- Historical era: Chinese Civil War
  - 6 September: 1937
  - Disestablished: 19 January 1950
Preceded by	Succeeded by
Chinese Soviet Republic	People's Republic of China
- Today part of: People's Republic of China

The Yan'an Soviet was a soviet established and governed by the Chinese Communist Party (CCP) during the 1930s and 1940s in North-Central China on the border area between Shaanxi, Gansu, and Ningxia. In October 1936, it became the final destination of the Long March, and served as the CCP's main base until after the Second Sino-Japanese War. After the CCP and Kuomintang (KMT) formed the Second United Front in 1937, the Yan'an Soviet was officially reconstituted as the Shaan–Gan–Ning Border Region (traditional Chinese: 陝甘寧邊區; simplified Chinese: 陕甘宁边区; pinyin: Shǎn gān níng Biānqū; Wade–Giles: Shan^{3}-kan^{1}-ning^{2} Pien^{1}-ch'ü^{1}). (Note: Postal romanization: Shen–Kan–Ning. The name comes from the Chinese abbreviations of Shaanxi, Gansu, and Ningxia provinces.) In CCP historiography, Yan'an is celebrated as the most important of revolutionary sites and the birthplace of Mao Zedong Thought.

== Organization ==
The Shaan–Gan–Ning base area, of which Yan'an was a part, was founded in 1934.

During the Second Sino-Japanese War, the Shaan–Gan–Ning Border Region became one of a number of border region governments established by the CCP. Other regions included the Jin–Sui Border Region (in Shanxi and Suiyuan), (Note: Suiyuan is no longer a province, being incorporated into Inner Mongolia in 1954.) the Jin–Cha–Ji Border Region (in Shanxi, Chahar, and Hebei) and the Ji–Lu–Yu Border Region (in Hebei, Henan and Shandong).

Although not on the front lines of the Second Sino-Japanese War, the Shaan–Gan–Ning Border Region was the most politically important and influential revolutionary base area due to its function as the de facto capital of the Chinese Communist Revolution.

== History ==
After the Long March, the CCP lost 90% of its members. Mao Zedong was originally intent on heading to the USSR border, but changed his mind after hearing about a large soviet in Northern Shaanxi. Mao's army arrived in northern Shaanxi in 1935. When they arrived, they found a soviet wracked by sufan (purge) campaigns initiated by the local Politburo Central Committee under Liu Zhidan. The central leadership of the CCP ordered the purges stopped. Originally the KMT had control of practically all of the major cities, while the CCP only held a few counties in the countryside. Multiple attempts were made to move to richer lands, or to head to the USSR border to get support from the Soviets, but all were stymied.

In Yan'an, the CCP recruited peasants to the Communists cause. They were joined by patriotic young intellectuals from the eastern cities of China. The CCP took advantage of the increasing nationalism and the KMT's weak response to Japanese aggression to recruit allies. While Mao wanted a "united front against Chiang Kai-shek and Japanese aggression", the Communist International (Comintern) faction in the CCP, headed by Wang Ming, successfully pushed for an alliance with the KMT, against Mao's wishes. In December 1936, the Xi'an Incident occurred, where Chiang was kidnapped by his own soldiers and forced to agree to a Second United Front with the CCP. The CCP took advantage of the chaos to expand the base in Shaanxi and take Yan'an. In January 1937, the CCP headquarters were established in Yan'an. Early 1937 was a period of relative peace, where in many areas of Shaanxi the CCP shared administration with the KMT, however there were frequent disputes over taxation rights.

On 7 July 1937, the Marco Polo Bridge incident occurred, beginning the Second Sino-Japanese War. By this point Chiang Kai-shek was fully willing to negotiate with the CCP, and the Shaan–Gan–Ning Border Region was officially established. During this war, there was an internal power struggle between Mao and the pro-Soviet faction, headed by Wang Ming, who wanted closer relations with the KMT and a more aggressive strategy in the war, following the Comintern line, while Mao wanted operational independence from the KMT and a more conservative strategy focused on guerilla warfare. Wang Jiaxiang, an ally of Mao, eventually successfully lobbied the USSR and got verbal recognition of Mao's leadership of the CCP. During the 6th Plenum of the 6th Central Committee (September 29–November 6, 1938), Mao used this verbal recognition to monopolize power of the CCP, and dealt a heavy blow to the power of Wang Ming.

During the Yan'an period, Mao also began to seriously develop Mao Zedong Thought, and wrote many famous essays such as On Practice and On Contradiction. By the 1940s Mao had for all intents and purposes becomes the chief Marxist theoretician of the CCP. On May 19th of 1941, Mao also began the "Reform our Study Movement", to teach the Soviet Union's textbook History of the Communist Party of the Soviet Union as well as Mao Zedong Thought. Mao also successfully used divide and conquer tactics to break his political opponents in the Comintern faction, and by 1941 the faction had basically dissolved.

Beginning in November 1938 and continuing through October 1941, Yan'an was the target of bombings by the Japanese forces.

By 1939, the KMT began to fear the CCP gaining strength and eventually attacked them in spring of that year. While the KMT took control of much of eastern Gansu, the CCP took control of the rich east including Suide. In the summer of 1940, Zhou Enlai met with Chiang's chief of staff and once again agreed on borders.

On 6 January 1941, the KMT prohibited domestic and foreign aid from entering the Shaanxi–Gansu–Ningxia Border Region and attempted to encircle it. In March 1941, the region repelled the KMT's attack. The KMT blockaded the region, leading to increased inflation, reduced access to goods that were daily necessities, and increased taxes on the peasants. Among the responses to this situation was the Mass Production Campaign, which sought to expand production and also reorganize production through cooperative social relations.

On 1 February 1942 Mao began the rectification campaign, to purge the CCP of the Comintern faction, May 4th ideology, and instate Mao Zedong Thought as the primary doctrine. Originally Mao encouraged criticism as a weapon against his enemies, but critics such as Wang Shiwei complained about egalitarianism and free discussion being replaced with censorship and self criticism, and the hierarchy of cadres. As a result, Mao held a struggle session against Wang Shiwei, who was eventually imprisoned and later executed in 1947. This was along with a general purge of the cultural community in 1942. Mao began pushing anti-intellectualism and prioritized making culture subservient to politics. Mao pushed constant self reflection and self criticism to shape CCP cadres into the "New Socialist Man". The Emergency Rescue Campaign, primarily carried out by Kang Sheng, commenced in April 1943. This brought the usage of mass rallies and struggle sessions, as well as self-criticism and confession, to a fever pitch. In many instances confessions were extracted through torture, and people frequently resorted to extreme exaggeration of crimes to prove repentance, as well as blaming others. This campaign did not end until December 1943, when the USSR sent a cable denouncing the campaign.

In 1944 the reexamination campaign began and the Emergency Rescue Campaign was rolled back, with many of the confessions and verdicts reexamined. However, by this point Mao had practically achieved his goals with the campaign. By May 1944, the 7th Plenum of the 6th CCP Central Committee was held, enshrining Mao Zedong Thought as the primary doctrine of the CCP and securing Mao supreme leadership over the party.

Throughout 1946, Mao aimed for peaceful reconciliation with the KMT, but Chiang refused and eventually negotiations broke down. In March 1947, KMT forces attacked Yan'an directly and managed to capture it, but Mao led a guerilla campaign throughout the countryside and eventually managed to defeat the KMT and form the People's Republic of China.

== Society ==
By the early 1940s, Yan'an had 37,000–38,000 residents, with 7,000 of them being locals and the rest being CCP cadres. The Yan'an soviet was controlled by Central Committee planning, and heavily influenced by the experience of the Ruijin era. By 1937, many youth were migrating to Yan'an, and the CCP established a dozen schools. These schools played a key part in Yan'an political life, prioritizing ideological training. There was a rich intellectual cultural life and many publications, such as the New China Daily, Liberation Weekly, Political Affairs, and more. The schools and CCP organs were generally led by veteran cadres, who were often only in their late 20s and 30s. Yan'an was somewhat hierarchical, with veteran cadres getting much better treatments, rations, and social status. Yan'an was culturally distinct from the rest of the Shaan–Gan–Ning border area, particularly Shaanbei, which was notoriously culturally conservative and traditional. The CCP installed elections throughout the Shaan–Gan–Ning Border Region. While they were one party systems, they still allowed a level of citizen input, and participation was high, particularly in the richer northeast.

=== Women's movement ===
In 1939, Mao Zedong proposed the creation of a women's university where the CCP could develop female cadres. The Chinese Women's University was inaugurated on 20 July of that year, and Mao's inauguration speech emphasized the role of women in resisting the Japanese invasion of China. Mao stated, "The day all women in China rise up is the moment of China's revolutionary victory!" The curriculum focused on revolutionary theory and methods, leadership skills in the women's movement, and professional skills deemed relevant for national reconstruction and resisting the Japanese invasion.

On 1 February 1940, the Central Committee of the Chinese Communist Party instructed that for International Women's Day, local party branches. should emphasize the need for women across social classes to unite in opposition to those who collaborated with the invading Japanese. In the 1940s, one of the major themes of the women's movement in Yan'an was to denounce Chen Bijun, the wife Japanese collaborator Wang Jingwei.

While the CCP made strides to extend equal rights to women, they struggled against the traditional customs of arranged marriage and dowry. In 1939, the CCP reformed marriage law in order to allow free marriage and divorce, but this was frequently abused by the family of brides, who used the easy divorce to arrange marriages with a greater "caili" (a dowry given by the groom). Continued reforms were enacted in 1944 and 1946 to attempt to moderate these abuses and stop the sale of women via marriage.

=== Art and literature ===
In April 1938, the Lu Xun Academy of Art and Literature (Luyi) was founded in Yan'an as a training center for CCP artists. On 2 August 1939, Luyi moved into the Qiao'ergou Catholic Church, where it became a cultural center for Yan'an. The academy became Yan'an's most important cultural institution. Along with other cultural institutions in Yan'an, the academy sought to increase support and commitment for the war against the invading Japanese.

Well-known actor and director Yuan Muzhi arrived in Yan'an in the fall of 1938. With Wu Yinxian, Yuan made a feature-length documentary, Yan'an and the Eighth Route Army, which depicted the Eighth Route Army's combat against the Japanese. They also filmed Norman Bethune—a Canadian surgeon volunteering to help the CCP—performing surgeries close to the front lines.

To commemorate International Women's Day in 1940, the Yan'an Soviet organized performances of plays showcasing heroic women, including Mother Yue Tattooing Characters, Liang Hongyu, and Qiu Jin. The selection of plays was intended to encourage the people, particularly women, in opposing the Japanese invasion of China.

In May 1940, Mao Dun and his family traveled to Yan'an. In Yan'an, he wrote essays praising the CCP's transformation of the region through both cultivation of culture and of labor.

Ding Ling's short story When I Was in Xia Village was first published in Yan'an in June 1941.

In May 1942, Mao delivered the Yan'an Talks (the Yan'an Forum on Literature and Art). The core concept of the Yan'an Talks was that art should translate the ideas of the Chinese Communist Revolution for rural peasants. This was an effort to reconfigure the social relationship in China between those who workers with their hands and those who wrote. In order to support the ongoing production campaign, the idea of a labor hero became more and more supported. By embracing and creating art about labor heroes, who were exemplars of production and the people's revolutionary cause, intellectuals could gain legitimacy in socialist society. Intellectuals were expected to go to the people and write from the perspective of the proletariat class. The most famous of these labor heroes was Wu Manyou.

During the Yan'an years, artists were encouraged to embrace folk art forms. The CCP made use of traditional folk practices such as Northern Shaanxi storytelling to spread and disseminate its policies. During the rectification movement, Lu Xun Academy of Arts increased its focus on local artistic customs and folk art.

In Yan'an, the Yangge Movement (late 1942 to 1946) adapted yangge to incorporate socialist themes. The Lu Xun Academy of Arts had a significant role in the movement. The Storytelling Campaign (which grew out of the Yangge movement and peaked in 1945), likewise aimed to adapt traditional performance genres to popularize revolutionary ideas.

The White-Haired Girl was first performed in April 1945 in Yan'an as a tribute to the Seventh National Congress of the CCP. It was one of the first large scale theatrical productions created in Yan'an.

=== Media ===
From July to October 1936, journalist Edgar Snow visited the Yan'an commune, eventually writing the book Red Star Over China, which was extremely influential and shaped the perspective of many contemporary Chinese youth, who viewed Yan'an as a center of revolutionary egalitarianism. As a result, many youth from KMT-held areas traveled to Yan'an.

In January 1937, American journalist Agnes Smedley visited Yan'an. In April, Helen Foster Snow traveled to Yan'an for research, interviewing Mao and other leaders.

The Eighth Route Army established its first film production group in the Yan'an Soviet during September 1938.

In 1943, the CCP released their first campaign film, Nanniwan, which sought to develop relationships between the Red Army and local people in the Yan'an area by showcasing the army's production campaign to alleviate material shortages.

In 1944, the CCP welcomed a large group of foreign (primarily American) journalists to Yan'an. In an effort to contrast the CCP with the Nationalists, the CCP generally did not censor these foreign reports. In December 1945, the CCP Central Committee instructed the party to facilitate the work of American journalists out of the hope that it would have a progressive influence on American policies toward China.

=== Other cultural practices ===
The CCP's first mass campaign against superstition occurred in Yan'an in 1944 and 1945. The campaign sought to eliminate shamanic ritual practices, reform shamans into productive workers, and to promote public health and hygiene. Prompted by high mortality rates and rates of gynecological diseases, the campaign emphasized replacing shamanic practices with modern medicine.

During the Yan'an period, the CCP adapted kinship terminology to political contexts. For example, the term xiongdi (brother, brothers) expanded to include revolutionary comrades (tongzhi) in addition to relatives and poor and lower-middle peasants became nongmin xiongdi (peasant brothers).

=== Legal system ===
The CCP in Yan'an also developed a new form of legal practice known as "Ma Xiwu's Way". This practice emphasized the usage of both mediation and adjudication in local civil cases, through a process of soliciting community opinion, making court accessible and open to the whole community, and making decisions based on mass opinion and approval, under the guidance of a revolutionary judge. This was promoted as a democratic approach to the law, and principles of "Ma Xiwu's way" continue to be used even after the People's Republic of China was formed.

Generally, the legal system in Yan'an favored rehabilitation more than punishment for crimes deemed non-political.

For crimes deemed "most heinous", such as traitors, the CCP held public trials with a jury composed of local government officials. These public trials typically had audiences of thousands of locals. The penalty in these most serious cases was usually execution. The CCP would publicize these trials throughout the Yan'an Soviet.

== Economy ==
Immediately after setting up the Soviet, the CCP began their "land revolution", confiscating property en-masse from the landlords and gentry of the region. Its vigour in doing so resulted from two factors, its ideological commitment to peasant revolution and economic necessity. The base area's economic situation was precarious, such that in 1936 the entire Soviet's revenue stood at just 1,904,649 yuan, of which some 652,858 yuan came from confiscation of property. The program of land redistribution, the CCP's hostility towards merchants and its ban on opium depressed the local economy severely, and by 1936 CCP forces were reduced to raiding nearby Shanxi (then ruled by Nationalist-backed warlord Yan Xishan) in order to acquire grain and other supplies. The tightening of the Nationalist blockade in the same year made it difficult to secure resources from outside the region. At no point during the period 1934-1941 was the Yan'an Soviet financially solvent, being dependent first on the confiscation of property from "enemy classes" and (after the formation of the Second United Front) on Nationalist aid, the latter of which comprised around 70% of the Soviet's revenue from 1937 to 1940.

The region was already economically poor and sparsely populated, with low agricultural production and unreliable rainfall. Agriculture was mainly characterized by millet, beans, and sorghum, along with sheep and goats. There were no navigable rivers, and irrigation and commerce were minimal. The CCP government organized production campaigns in 1939 and 1940, and organized cadres into work units to assist with agriculture. While early on most taxes besides the salt tax were eliminated, the tax burden began to grow, particularly in the 1940s as the CCP's state apparatus began to grow as well. The CCP government also enacted the "cooperative movement" to decrease rents and interest rates for the peasants, as well as creating programs to share animals, tools, and seeds.

In the Yan'an Soviet, the CCP encouraged women to produce textiles, both for purposes of supporting the economy with local cloth production and to increase women's involvement in public community life.

In 1938, the Yan'an Workers' Manufactured Goods Exhibition opened. It was designed to encourage industry in the area and promote economic development.

In an effort to increase the organization of villagers into cooperatives (having had limited success with the adoption of state-run cooperatives in Yan'an), the government adopted a model of "people-managed cooperatives." The government encouraged villagers to become shareholders of cooperatives, and that these people-owned (as opposed to state-owned) cooperatives should manage socioeconomics at the local level, including matters like trade, production, transportation, education, health, and tax collections. The first exemplar was the Ya'nan South District Cooperative, which was promoted as a model throughout the region in September 1942.

The Nationalist blockade decreased during the Second United Front, but it was renewed when the alliance fell apart in 1941. Japanese assaults in the region and poor harvests worsened the effects of blockade and the region had a severe economic crisis in 1941 and 1942, and continued into 1943.

By 1944, the region had suffered cumulative inflation of 564,700% since 1937, compared with 75,550% in Nationalist areas. CCP leaders raised the issue of abandoning the area, which Mao Zedong refused to do. Mao implemented a mass line strategy, and imposed heavy taxes on the population in order to pay military expenses, which resulted in what is known as the "Yan'an Way", establishing the Border Region's independence from Nationalist subsidy. Other policies included rent and interest reduction, streamlined administration, the cooperative movement, and the Great Production Drive to improve agricultural and industrial production. The economy of the Border Region was also substantially supported by the production and export of opium into Japanese and Nationalist areas, with academic Chen Yung-fa contending that the economy of the Border Region was so dependent on opium that, had the CCP not engaged in opium trading, the Yan'an Way would have been impossible.

As part of its campaign to improve rural socioeconomic development in 1944, one of the areas where the Yan'an Soviet government focused was on reducing infant mortality, eliminating unhygienic childbirth customs, and improving care for gynecological diseases.

== Science and technology ==
In the Yan'an era, the CCP further embraced science as part of its drive for self-sufficiency and local industrialization to overcome economic blockade from the Nationalists. In 1939, the CCP Central Committee established a scientific research institute in Yan'an, which became the Yan'an Academy of Natural Sciences in 1940. The Academy merged with Yan'an University in 1936. Its approach began with a focus on the professional science model and Western scientific institutional knowledge and, after the rectification movement, turned its focus towards a mass science model that promoted the usefulness of folk knowledge and self-reliance.

In 1940, the Natural Science Research Society was founded in Yan'an; CCP leadership emphasized its importance, stating that "economic work and technical work are an indispensible part of revolutionary work." The Natural Science Research Society disseminated scientific information, promoted communication with scientists elsewhere in China, and helped to identify visitors to Yan'an who had special scientific or technical expertise. As of year-end 1941, the society had 330 members.

In 1944, the CCP began manufacturing penicillin in the Yan'an.

Experiences in Yan'an contributed to Mao's emphasis on "mass science" in the 1950s.

== Healthcare ==
The CCP-controlled areas lacked access to Western-style medical resources. To improve health care, the CCP promoted the integration of traditional Chinese medicine with Western medical science. In Yan'an, mass campaigns sought to "scientize Chinese medicine" and "make Western medicine Chinese." As part of the mobilization effort, the CCP had state doctors lead the "scientizing" process and gave high political status and public honors to some local practitioners of traditional Chinese medicine.

== Diplomacy ==
After the US entry into World War II, the CCP sought military support from the US. Mao welcomed the American Military Observation Group in Yan'an and in 1944 invited the US to establish a consulate there.

== Legacy ==
In the early 1950s in the People's Republic of China, political and intellectual leaders were encouraged to emulate the "native methods" and mass arts and sciences that characterized the experience of Yan'an.

Yan'an is a site for red tourism. The "Golden Yan'an" tourist city features old-fashioned Chinese streets and shops in the style of the 1930s Yan'an Soviet. The major attraction of Golden Yan'an is "The Ode of Yan'an" show, which depicts historical moments from the Communist Party's Yan'an period presented with a light show on the mountains and an audio-visual projection on Baota Mountain.

== See also ==
- Outline of the Chinese Civil War
