= Marina Warner =

English writer, historian and mythographer (born 1946)

Dame Marina Warner CH DBE FRSL FBA
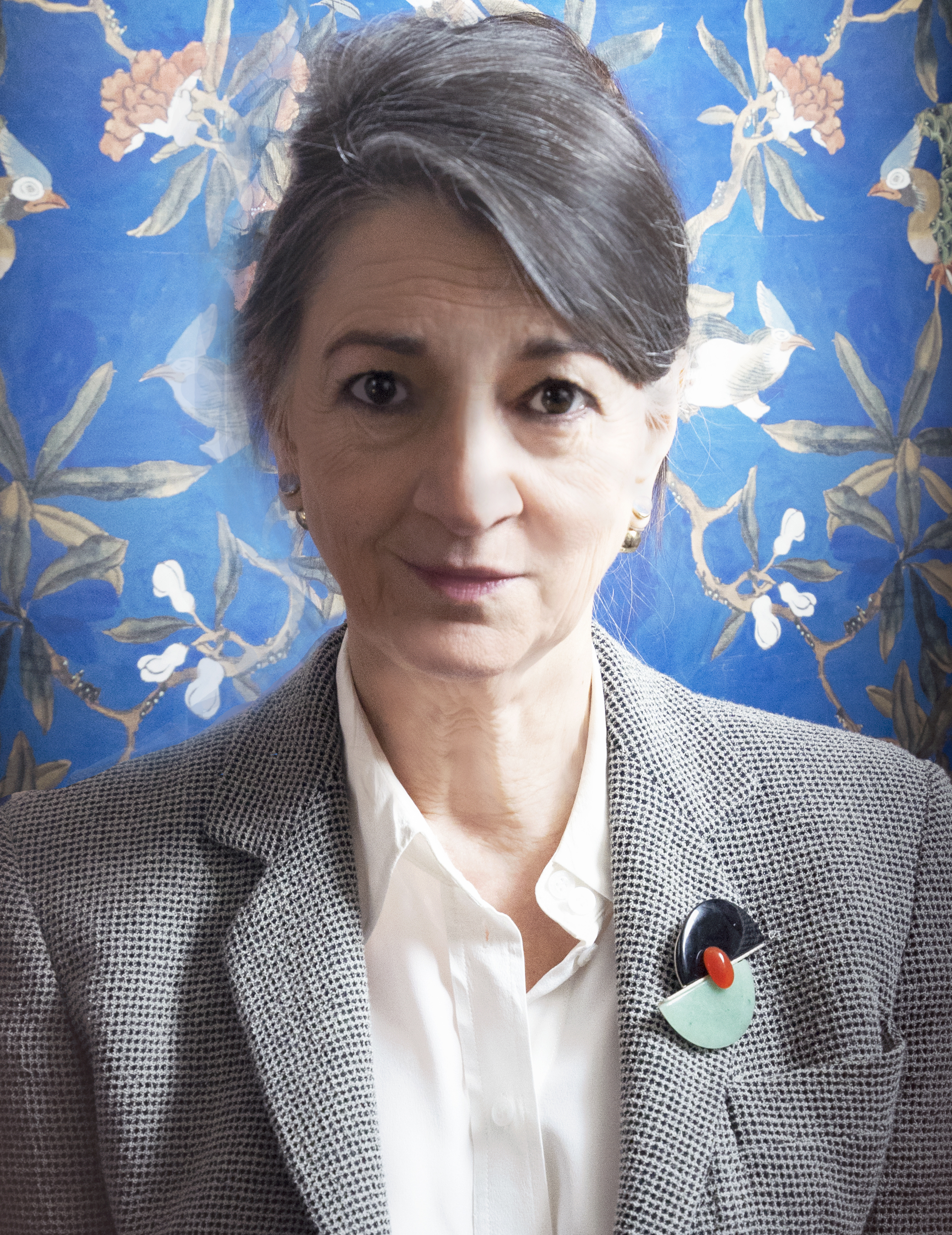
- Warner in 2017
- Born: Marina Sarah Warner; 9 November 1946 (age 79); Paddington, Middlesex, England
- Education: Lady Margaret Hall, Oxford
- Occupations: Historian, mythographer, novelist, lecturer, professor
- Spouse(s): William Shawcross (m. 1971; div. 1980) Johnny Dewe Mathews (m. 1981; div. 1997) Graeme Segal
- Relatives: Pelham Warner (grandfather)
- Writing career
- Notable awards: Mythopoeic Award; Rose Mary Crawshay Prize; National Book Critics Circle Award (Criticism); Holberg Prize; British Academy Medal
- Website: marinawarner.com

Dame Marina Sarah Warner (born 9 November 1946) is an English historian, mythographer, art critic, novelist and short story writer. She is known for her many non-fiction books relating to feminism and myth. She has written for many publications, including The London Review of Books, the New Statesman, Sunday Times, and Vogue. She has been a visiting professor, given lectures and taught on the faculties of many universities.

She resigned from her position as professor in the Department of Literature, Film and Theatre Studies at the University of Essex in 2014, sharply criticising moves towards "for-profit business model" universities in the UK, and is now Professor of English and Creative Writing at Birkbeck, University of London. In 2017, she was elected president of the Royal Society of Literature (RSL), the first time the role has been held by a woman since the founding of the RSL in 1820. She has been a Distinguished Fellow of All Souls College, Oxford, since 2019.

In 2015, having received the Holberg Prize, Warner used the award to start the Stories in Transit project, a series of workshops bringing international artists, writers and other creatives together with young migrants living in Palermo, Sicily.

Warner is a member of the editorial advisory board of the website EXPeditions.

== Biography ==
Marina Warner was born in London to an English father, Esmond Warner (died 1982), and Ilia (née Emilia Terzulli, died 2008), an Italian whom he had met during the Second World War in Bari, Apulia. Her paternal grandfather was the cricketer Sir Pelham Warner. She has one sister, Laura Gascoigne, who is an art critic.

Marina was brought up initially in Cairo, where her father ran a bookshop, until it was set on fire during attacks on foreign businesses in January 1952, a precursor to the Egyptian revolution. The family then moved to Brussels and to Cambridge and Berkshire, England, where Marina studied at St Mary's School, Ascot. She studied French and Italian at Lady Margaret Hall, Oxford. While at Oxford she was the editor of The Isis magazine (published by Robert Maxwell).

In 1971, she married William Shawcross, with whom she has a son, the sculptor Conrad. The couple divorced in 1980. She was married to the painter Johnny Dewe Mathews from 1981 to 1997. Her third husband is mathematician Graeme Segal.

Warner has been identified as the "lady writer" of the Dire Straits song "Lady Writer" (1979), whom the singer sees on television "talking about the Virgin Mary" and who reminds him of his former lover.

== Career ==
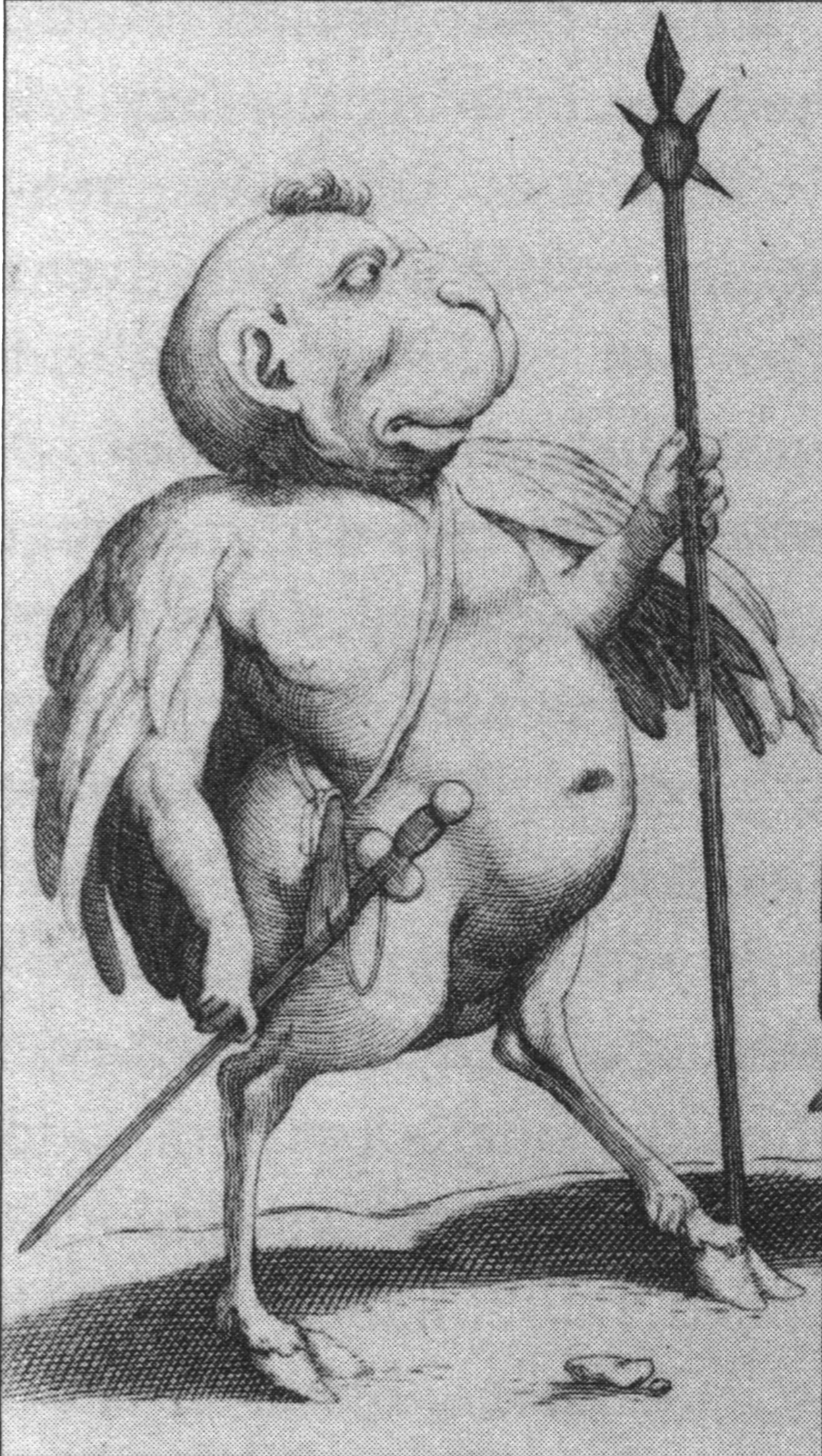
Illustration from No Go the Bogeyman

Warner began her career as a staff writer for The Daily Telegraph, before working as Vogue's features editor from 1969 until 1972.

Her first book was The Dragon Empress: The Life and Times of Tz'u-hsi, Empress Dowager of China, 1835–1908 (1972), followed by the controversial Alone of All Her Sex: The Myth and the Cult of the Virgin Mary (1976), a provocative study of Roman Catholic veneration of the Virgin Mary. These were followed by Joan of Arc: The Image of Female Heroism (1981) and Monuments & Maidens: The Allegory of the Female Form (1985).

Warner's novel The Lost Father was on the Booker Prize shortlist in 1988. Her non-fiction book From the Beast to the Blonde: On Fairy Tales and Their Tellers won a Mythopoeic Award in 1996. The companion study of the male terror figure (from ancient myth and folklore to modern obsessions), No Go the Bogeyman: On Scaring, Lulling, and Making Mock, was published in October 1998 and won the British Academy's Rose Mary Crawshay Prize in 2000. Warner's other novels include The Leto Bundle (2001) and Indigo (1992). Her book Phantasmagoria (2006) traces the ways in which "the spirit" has been represented across different mediums, from waxworks to cinema.

In December 2012, she presented a programme on BBC Radio Four about the Brothers Grimm. She was elected a Fellow of the Royal Society of Literature in 1984. In 1994 she became only the second woman to deliver the BBC's Reith Lectures, published as Managing Monsters: Six Myths of Our Time, in which she gave an analysis of the workings of myth in contemporary society, with emphasis on politics and entertainment.

Warner received an honorary doctorate (DLitt) from the University of Oxford on 21 June 2006, and also holds honorary degrees from the universities of Exeter (1995), York (1997) and St Andrews (1998), and honorary doctorates from Sheffield Hallam University (1995), the University of North London (1997), the Tavistock Institute (University of East London; 1999), Oxford University (2002), the Royal College of Art (2004), University of Kent (2005), the University of Leicester (2006), and King's College London (2009).

She was appointed Commander of the Order of the British Empire (CBE) in the 2008 Queen's Birthday Honours for services to literature.

She was a professor in the Department of Literature, Film and Theatre Studies at the University of Essex from 2004 until her resignation in 2014. She took up a chair in English and Creative Writing at Birkbeck College, University of London, in September 2014. She is a quondam fellow of All Souls College, Oxford, and was chair of the judges of the Man Booker International Prize 2015.

Warner was appointed Dame Commander of the Order of the British Empire (DBE) in the 2015 New Year Honours for services to higher education and literary scholarship.

In 2015–16, she was the Weidenfeld Visiting Professor of European Comparative Literature in St Anne's College, Oxford, part of the Humanitas Programme.

In March 2017, Warner was elected as the 19th—and first female—president of the Royal Society of Literature (RSL), succeeding Colin Thubron in the post. On Warner's retirement from the role at the end of 2021, Bernardine Evaristo became the new president, with Warner subsequently becoming RSL President Emerita.

In 2019, Warner chaired the judges of the OCM Bocas Prize for Caribbean Literature.

She was appointed Member of the Order of the Companions of Honour (CH) in the 2022 Birthday Honours for services to the humanities.

Warner is a member of the editorial advisory board of the website EXPeditions.

== Honours and awards ==
- 1984: Elected Fellow of the Royal Society of Literature
- 1986: Fawcett Society Book Prize for Monuments and Maidens: The Allegory of the Female Form
- 1988: Booker Prize for Fiction (shortlist) for The Lost Father
- 1988: PEN/Macmillan Silver Pen Award for The Lost Father
- 1989: Commonwealth Writers Prize (Eurasia Region, Best Book) for The Lost Father
- 1996: Mythopoeic Award for From the Beast to the Blonde: On Fairy Tales and Their Tellers
- 1999: Katharine Briggs Folklore Award for No Go the Bogeyman: Scaring, Lulling and Making Mock
- 2000: Chevalier de l'Ordre des Arts et des Lettres (France)
- 2000: Rose Mary Crawshay Prize for English Literature for No Go the Bogeyman: Scaring, Lulling and Making Mock
- 2005: Commendatore dell'Ordine della Stella di Solidarieta (Italy)
- 2005: Elected Fellow of the British Academy
- 2008: Appointed Commander of the Order of the British Empire (CBE)
- 2012: National Book Critics Circle Award (Criticism) for Stranger Magic: Charmed States and the Arabian Nights
- 2013: Truman Capote Award for Literary Criticism for Stranger Magic
- 2013: Sheikh Zayed Book Award for Arab Culture in Non-Arabic Languages for Stranger Magic
- 2013: All Souls College, Oxford Two-Year Fellowship
- 2013: Mansfield College, Oxford, Honorary Fellow
- 2013: St Cross College, Oxford, Honorary Fellow
- 2015: Dame Commander of the Order of the British Empire (DBE), for services to higher education and literary scholarship
- 2015: Holberg Prize, for "her work on the analysis of stories and myths and how they reflect their time and place"
- 2017–2021: Elected president of the Royal Society of Literature
- 2017: British Academy Medal "for lifetime achievement"
- 2017: World Fantasy Award "for lifetime achievement"
- 2022: Member of the Order of the Companions of Honour, for services to the humanities.

== Publications ==
- The Dragon Empress: Life and Times of Tz'u-hsi 1835–1908 (Weidenfeld & Nicolson, 1972)
- Alone of All Her Sex: The Myth and the Cult of the Virgin Mary (Weidenfeld & Nicolson, 1976) ISBN 0-330-28771-0
- In a Dark Wood (Weidenfeld & Nicolson, 1977)
- Queen Victoria Sketch Book (Macmillan, 1979)
- The Crack in the Tea-Cup: Britain in the 20th Century (André Deutsch, 1979)
- Joan of Arc: The Image of Female Heroism (Weidenfeld & Nicolson, 1981)
- The Impossible Day (Methuen, 1981)
- The Impossible Night (Methuen, 1981)
- The Impossible Bath (Methuen, 1982)
- The Impossible Rocket (Methuen, 1982)
- The Skating Party (Weidenfeld & Nicolson, 1982)
- The Wobbly Tooth (André Deutsch, 1984)
- Monuments and Maidens: The Allegory of the Female Form (Weidenfeld & Nicolson, 1985)
- The Lost Father (Chatto & Windus, 1988)
- Into the Dangerous World (Chatto & Windus, 1989)
- Imagining a Democratic Culture (Charter 88, 1991)
- Indigo (Chatto & Windus, 1992)
- L'Atalante (British Film Institute, 1993)
- Mermaids in the Basement (Chatto & Windus, 1993)
- Richard Wentworth (Thames & Hudson, 1993)
- From the Beast to the Blonde: On Fairy Tales and Their Tellers (Chatto & Windus, 1994)
- Managing Monsters: Six Myths of Our Time (Reith Lectures) (Vintage, 1994)
- Wonder Tales: Six Stories of Enchantment (editor) (Chatto & Windus, 1994)
- Six Myths Of Our Time: Little Angels, Little Monsters, Beautiful Beasts, and More (New York: Vintage, 1995)
- Donkey Business Donkey Work: Magic and Metamorphoses in Contemporary Opera (University of Wales, 1996)
- The Inner Eye: Art beyond the Visible (National Touring Exhibitions, 1996)
- No Go the Bogeyman: Scaring, Lulling and Making Mock (Chatto & Windus, 1998)
- The Leto Bundle (Chatto & Windus, 2001) Long listed for the Man Booker Prize.
- Fantastic Metamorphoses, Other Worlds (Oxford University Press, 2002)
- Murderers I Have Known and Other Stories (Chatto & Windus, 2002)
- Collected Poems by Sally Purcell – preface (Anvil, 2002)
- Signs & Wonders: Essays on Literature and Culture (Chatto & Windus, 2003)
- Phantasmagoria (Oxford University Press, 2006)
- Stranger Magic: Charmed States & The Arabian Nights (Chatto & Windus, 2011)
- Once Upon a Time: A Short History of Fairy Tale (Oxford University Press, 2014)
- Fly Away Home (Salt Publishing, 2015)
- Fairy Tale: A Very Short Introduction (Oxford University Press, 2018)
- Forms of Enchantment: Writings on Art and Artists (Thames & Hudson, 2018)
- Inventory of a Life Mislaid: An Unreliable Memoir (Collins, 2021)
- Helen Chadwick: The Oval Court (Afterall Books, 2022)
- Temporale (Sylph Editions, 2023)
- Sanctuary: Ways of Telling, Ways of Dwelling (William Collins, 2025)

Awards and achievements
Preceded by Elizabeth Wright; Karen O'Brien	Rose Mary Crawshay Prize; 2000 and Joanne Wilkes	Succeeded by Annette Peach; Lucy Newlyn
