= Humanitas Programme =

The Humanitas Programme.

The Humanitas Programme is a series of Visiting Professorships at the Universities of Oxford and Cambridge in England, intended to bring leading practitioners and scholars to both universities to address major themes in the arts, social sciences, and humanities.

Appointed for a given academic year, each Humanitas Visiting Professor delivers a series of events ranging from lectures to workshops, masterclasses, recitals and symposia. Lectures and symposia are filmed and available online to audiences throughout the world

Created by Lord Weidenfeld in 2010, the Humanitas Programme is funded by a number of donors and managed by the Oxford-based Weidenfeld-Hoffmann Trust. The Humanitas Programme has also been run in collaboration with TORCH The Oxford Research Centre in the Humanities and CRASSH Centre for Research in the Arts, Social Sciences and Humanities

The Humanitas Programme often draws media attention for its topical and high-profile speakers, such as Eric Schmidt sharing a positive outlook on the impact of new technologies on our world, or Murray Perahia exploring the personal and universal in the work musical genius, or Shirin Neshat discussing the formation of her artistic identity.

Its Visiting Professorships have touched upon topics ranging from the complexity of narrating history to the challenges of sustainable development in the 21st century.

== List of Humanitas Visiting Professorships ==
Visiting Professorship in Architecture University of Oxford, Brasenose College

- 2010–2011: Lord Foster (architect), How do we sustainably accommodate even larger populations in cities in a way that does not recklessly deplete natural resources?
- 2011–2012: Lord Foster (architect), Heritage and Lessons

Visiting Professorship in Chamber Music University of Cambridge, Peterhouse

- 2010–2011: Alfred Brendel (pianist), On Character in Music and Light and Shade of Interpretation
- 2012–2013: Robert Levin (Harvard), Encountering Mozart
- 2013–2014: Angela Hewitt, The Art of Fugue
- 2014–2015: Murray Perahia, On Performing the Classics
- 2015–2016: Mitsuko Uchida,

Visiting Professorship in Chinese Studies University of Cambridge, St Catharine's College

- 2011–2012: Wu Hung, Reading Absence in Chinese Art and Material Culture
- 2012–2013: Chen Yung-fa, The Meaning of the Chinese Communist Revolution
- 2013–2014: David Wang, What is Chinese about Chinese Literature?
- 2014–2015: Xu Bing, The Reactivation of Tradition

Visiting Professorship in Classical Music and Musical Education University of Oxford, St John's College

- 2012–2013: Imogen Cooper (pianist), Schubert
- 2013–2014: Midori (violinist and educator), Bach, Brahms, Music Education and Community Engagement
- 2014–2015: Ian Bostridge Why Winterreise? Schubert's song cycle, then and now
- 2015–2016:Sérgio and Odair Assad

Visiting Professorship in Comparative European Literature University of Oxford, St Anne's College

- 2010–2011: James Wood (Harvard), Everything, Nothing, Something; 'Melville and the New Atheists; Jens Peter Jacobsen and the contradictions of atheism; 'Tolstoy's Third Way Lecture; An answer vouchsafed them: Virginia Woolf's mystic God; Beckett and Nothing, online
- 2011–2012: Ali Smith (author), On Time, On Form, On Edge, On Offer, and On Reflection
- 2013–2013: Don Paterson The Domain of the Poem
- 2014–2015: Javier Cercas The Blind Spot

Visiting Professorship in Contemporary Art (including photography) University of Oxford, Magdalen College

- 2010–2011: Thomas Struth (photographer), Do pictures contribute to identity and cultural difference?
- 2011–2012: Shirin Neshat (artist and filmmaker), Images and History
- 2012–2013: William Kentridge (artist), Thinking On One's Feet
- 2013–2014: Vik Muniz Class Dismissed . . . Art, Creativity and Education
- 2014–2015: Maya Lin Between Art and Architecture

Visiting Professorship in Drama University of Oxford, Brasenose College

- 2010–2011: Athol Fugard (playwright), The Playwriting Process and Theatrical Directing
- 2011–2012: Vanessa Redgrave (actress), Theatre and Politics Today
- 2012–2013: Gregory Doran (Artistic Director of the Royal Shakespeare Company)
- 2014–2015: David Edgar Plays Today

Visiting Professorship in Economic Thought University of Oxford, All Souls College

- 2011–2012: Sir Partha Dasgupta (Cambridge), Time and the Generations
- 2012–2013: Stanley Fischer (Governor of the Bank of Israel), Lessons of the Crisis
- 2013–2014: Roger Myerson (Nobel laureate, University of Chicago), Political Economy and Economic Development

Visiting Professorship in Film & Television University of Oxford, St Anne's College

- 2012–2013: Michael Winterbottom (film director), Genre, Adaptation, and Contemporary Cinema
- 2013–2014: Kelly Reichardt American Landscapes and Narratives of the Road
- 2016–2017: Lenny Abrahamson The Uncertain Filmmaker
- 2017–2018: Sam Mendes

Visiting Professorship in Historiography University of Oxford, Trinity College

- 2011–2012: Saul Friedländer (UCLA), Trends in the Historiography of the Holocaust
- 2012–2013: Christopher Bayly (University of Cambridge), Worlds of Thought: Empire, India and Islam
- 2013–2014: Lynn Hunt Dilemmas of History in a Global Age
- 2014–2015: Barbara Rosenwein The History of Emotions
- 2015–2016: Simon Schama, the Past and its Publics

Visiting Professorship in the History of Art University of Cambridge, Clare College

- 2012–2013: Philippe de Montebello (former Director of the Metropolitan Museum of Art, New York), The Multiple Lives of the Work of Art
- 2013–2014: Pierre Rosenberg (former Director of the Louvre), Poussin in England
- 2015–2016: Wim Pijbes (Director of the Rijksmuseum, Amsterdam), Old Masters Fit for the Future

Visiting Professorship in the History of Ideas University of Oxford, Merton College

- 2012–2013: Lorraine Daston (Executive Director of the Max Planck Institute, Berlin), Nature's Revenge: A History of Risk, Responsibility, and Reasonableness
- 2016–2017: Jared Diamond (Professor of Geography at the University of California, Los Angeles), The Use of Religion

Visiting Professorship in Intelligence Studies University of Oxford, All Souls College

- 2013–2014: General Hayden (Former Director of the Central Intelligence Agency), Terrorism and Islam's Civil War
- 2014–2015: John McLaughlin (Former Deputy Director of the Central Intelligence Agency), Challenges Facing American Intelligence

Visiting Professorship in Interfaith Studies University of Oxford, Lady Margaret Hall

- 2010–2012: Jan Assmann (University of Konstanz), Ancient Egyptian Religion
- 2011–2012: Lord Sacks (Chief Rabbi of the United Hebrew Congregations of the Commonwealth), A Jewish Theology of the Other
- 2012–2013: Abdou Filali-Ansary (Aga Khan University, London), Beyond Apologetics: Approaching Religious Traditions Through Modern Disciplines
- 2013–2014: Rowan Williams, Faith and Power

Visiting Professorship in Media University of Cambridge, St John's College

- 2010–2011: Mathias Döpfner (CEO of Axel Springer AG), ‘The Freedom Trap’, ‘The Internet – a Liberating or Enslaving Machine?’ and ‘Can Journalism be Free in the Digital Age?'
- 2011–2012: Manuel Castells (UCLA), Communication Power in the Network Society
- 2012–2013: Eric Schmidt (Executive Chairman of Google), Our Connected Age
- 2013–2014: Alastair Campbell (former Director of Communications and Strategy to Prime Minister Tony Blair), A Life at the Nexus of Media and Politics
- 2014–2015: Emily Bell, (Director of the Tow Center for Digital Journalism, Columbia University), The Impact of Social Media and the Internet on Journalism and News Publishing

Visiting Professorship in Museums, Galleries, and Libraries University of Oxford, Balliol College

- 2010–2011: Glen D. Lowry (Director of the Museum of Modern Art, New York), The Abodes of the Muses: Theorising the Modern Art Museum
- 2011–2012: Malcolm Rogers (Director of the Museum of Fine Arts, Boston), The Art Museum in the 21st Century
- 2012–2013: Ivo Mesquita (State Art Gallery of São Paulo), Contemporary Art and Globalisation
- 2013–2014: Michael Govan, A Voice from the Pacific: Re-envisioning the Art Museum
- 2014–2015: Stephen Greenblatt, The Humanities are they important?

Visiting Professorship in Opera Studies University of Oxford, New College

- 2011–2012: Joseph Volpe (General Manager of the Metropolitan Opera, 1990-2006), Whither Opera in the 21st Century?
- 2012–2013: Gerard Mortier (Director of Teatro Real de Madrid)
- 2013–2014: Renee Fleming (Soprano)
- 2015–2016: Christian Thielemann (Chief Conductor of the Staatskapelle Dresden)
- 2016–2017: William Christie (Director of Les Arts Florissants)

Visiting Professorship in Rhetoric and the Art of Public Persuasion University of Oxford, St Peter's College

- 2012–2013: Mark Thompson (former Director General of the BBC, CEO of The New York Times Company), The Cloud of Unknowing

Visiting Professorship in Statecraft and Diplomacy University of Cambridge, Pembroke College

- 2011–2012: Helen Clark (Administrator of the United Nations Development Programme; Chair of the United Nations Development Group; former Prime Minister of New Zealand), Development in the 21st Century
- 2012–2013: Gareth Evans (former Foreign Minister of Australia), In Defence of Optimism
- 2014–2015: Richard Haass World Order: Its Past, Present & Prospects
- 2015–2016: Martti Ahtisaari Preventing Conflicts and Building Fairer Societies

Visiting Professorship in Sustainability Studies University of Cambridge, Trinity Hall

- 2013–2014: Gretchen Daily (Stanford University), Nature's Competing Values
- 2014–2015: Johan Rockstrom, Human Prosperity within Planetary Boundaries
- 2015–2016 Paul Ferraro, Environmental Problems are Human Problems
- 2018–2019: Pamela Matson, The Tellus Mater Distinguished Fellowship’
- 2019–2020: Ruth de Fries, The Tellus Mater Distinguished Fellowship’

Visiting Professorship in Voice and Classical Music University of Oxford, New College

- 2014–2015: Sir John Tomlinson (Bass)
- 2017–2018: Andreas Scholl (Countertenor)
- 2019–2020: James Conlon (Richard Seaver Music Director, LA Opera)
- 2023-2024: Joyce DiDonato (Mezzo-soprano)

Visiting Professorship in War Studies University of Cambridge, Churchill College

- 2010–2011: Hew Strachan (Oxford), Modern War and the Question of History
- 2011–2012: Jay Winter (Yale University), Imagining War in the 20th Century and After
- 2012–2013: Martin van Creveld (Military historian and theorist), The Future of War

Visiting Professorship in Women's Rights University of Cambridge, King's College

- 2010–2011: Nancy Fraser (The New School), Women's Rights in the 21st Century
- 2011–2012: Baroness Kennedy QC (Principal, Mansfield College), The Illusion of Inclusion: Women and the Law
- 2012–2013: Melanne Verveer (United States Ambassador-at-Large for Global Women's Issues), Gender Equality: A Moral and Foreign Policy Imperative
- 2013–2014: Mona Siddiqui, Women in Islamic Thought and Literature
- 2014–2015: Natasha Walter, From Sexism to Solidarity
