= Yury Vlasov =

Soviet and Russian weightlifter (1935–2021)

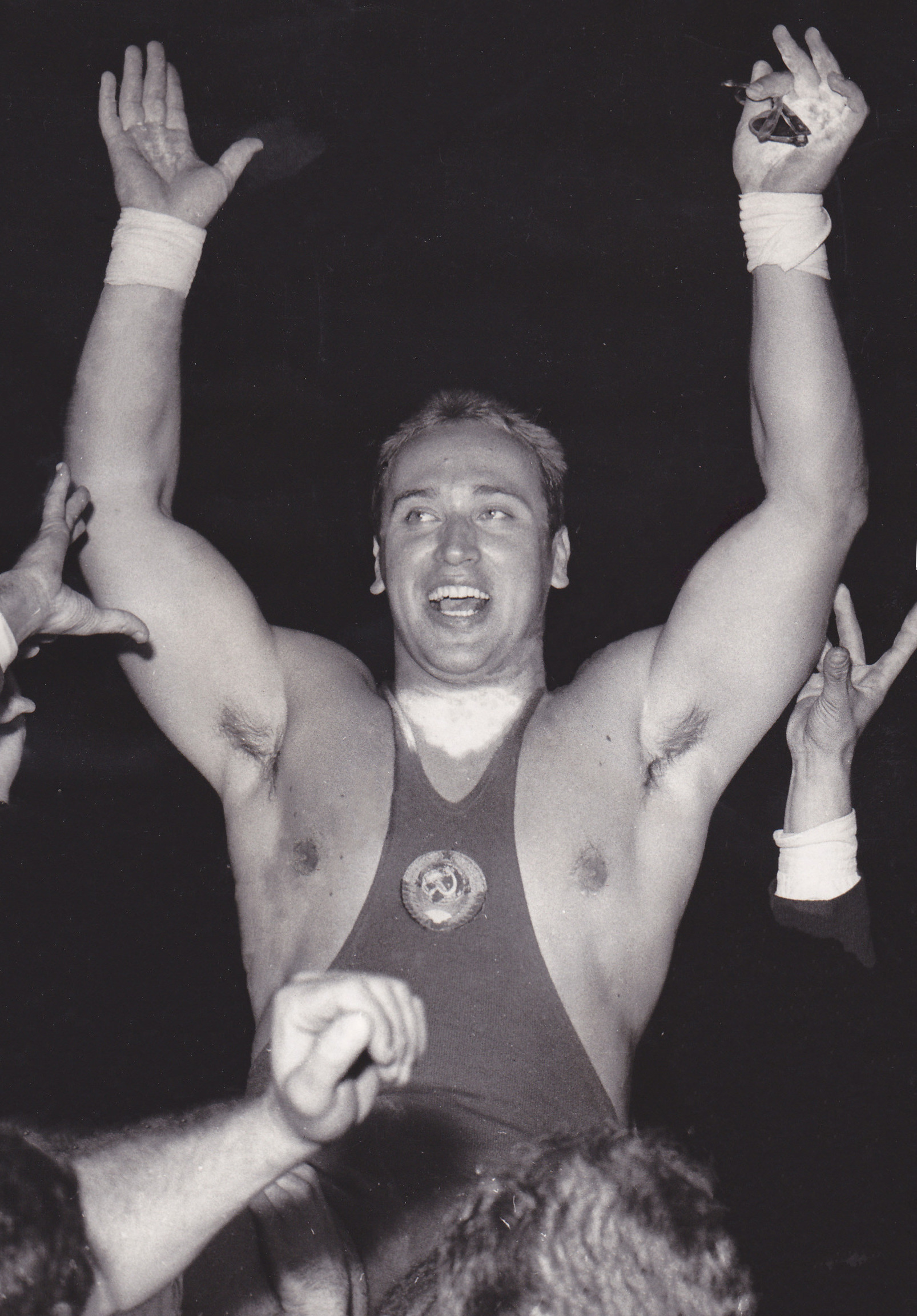
- Vlasov at the 1960 Olympics

Personal information
- Born: 5 December 1935 Makeyevka, Ukrainian SSR, Soviet Union
- Died: 13 February 2021 (aged 85) Moscow, Russia
- Height: 1.85 m (6 ft 1 in)
- Weight: 125–136 kg (276–300 lb)

Sport
- Sport: Weightlifting
- Coached by: Suren Bogdasarov
Medal record
Representing Soviet Union
Olympic Games
Gold medal – first place	1960 Rome	+90 kg
Silver medal – second place	1964 Tokyo	+90 kg
World Weightlifting Championships
Gold medal – first place	1959 Warsaw	+90 kg
Gold medal – first place	1961 Vienna	+90 kg
Gold medal – first place	1962 Budapest	+90 kg
Gold medal – first place	1963 Stockholm	+90 kg
Silver medal – second place	1964 Tokyo	+90 kg
European Weightlifting Championships
Gold medal – first place	1959 Warsaw	+90 kg
Gold medal – first place	1960 Milan	+90 kg
Gold medal – first place	1961 Vienna	+90 kg
Gold medal – first place	1962 Budapest	+90 kg
Gold medal – first place	1963 Stockholm	+90 kg
Gold medal – first place	1964 Moscow	+90 kg

Yury Petrovich Vlasov (Russian: Юрий Петрович Власов; 5 December 1935 – 13 February 2021) was a Soviet and Russian heavyweight weightlifter, writer and politician. He competed at the 1960 and 1964 Olympics and won a gold medal in 1960 and a silver in 1964; at both games, he was the Olympic flag bearer for the Soviet Union. During his career, Vlasov won four world titles and set 31 ratified world records. He retired in 1968 and became a prominent writer and later a politician. He was a member of the Congress of People's Deputies of the Soviet Union (1989) and then of the Russian State Duma (1993) and took part in the 1996 Russian presidential election.

== Early life and competitive career ==
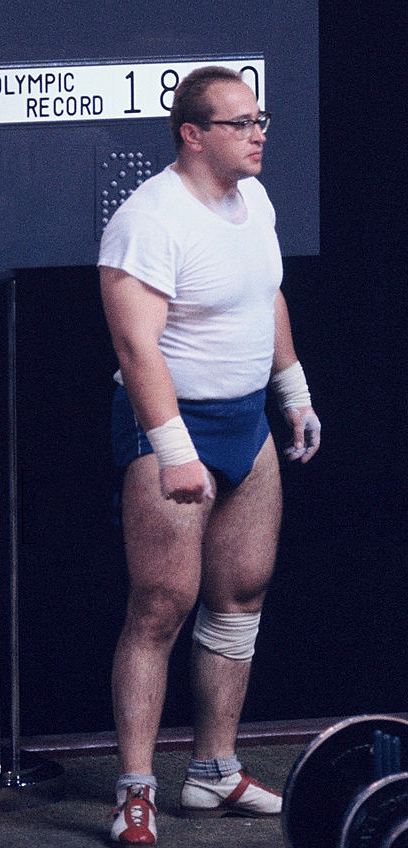
Vlasov at the 1964 Olympics

Yury was born in Makeyevka, Ukrainian SSR, to the family of Pyotr Vlasov (1905–1953), a military journalist and Comintern agent, and Maria Danilovna Vlasova (née Lymar), a Kuban Cossacks. His father worked as the General Consul in Shanghai and then the Ambassador to Burma. Both his parents were born in Russia.

Yury studied at the Saratov Suvorov military school (1946–1953), then at the Zhukovsky Air Force Academy in Moscow, from which he graduated with honors in 1959. In 1956, while studying at the academy he became interested in weightlifting, joined the Armed Forces sports society and soon became Master of Sport of the USSR (1957). He was noticed in 1958 when he finished third at the Soviet Union championships. Between 1959 and 1963 he won all the competitions he participated in, with a major success at the Rome 1960 Summer Olympics where he set three world records and became the first man to clean and jerk more than 200 kg (202.5). He was proclaimed the best sportsman of the 1960 Olympics and the "Strongest Man on the Planet". Going against the stereotypes attached to weightlifting, he was considered a nerdish intellectual in rim glasses.

At the 1964 Summer Olympics he finished second, after another Soviet weightlifter, Leonid Zhabotinsky. Vlasov was breaking world records at the 1964 Olympics and was aiming to retire from competitions with the gold medal. He was bitterly disappointed by the tactical tricks played by Zhabotinsky during the final clean-and-jerk event, which he considered dishonest – Zhabotinsky intentionally failed his second attempt, and talked and behaved as if he would not compete for the gold medal. In reality Zhabotinsky merely positioned himself behind Vlasov, who started the event first, and in his last attempt would order (and lift) any weight required to win the overall competition.

Although Vlasov announced his retirement after the 1964 Olympics, he resumed top-level training in 1966 for financial reasons. He set his last world record on 15 May 1967, by pressing 199 kg, for which he received 850 rubles. Vlasov retired from senior competitions in June 1968. Around the same time he also retired from the Soviet Army, where he worked as a sports instructor. He held the rank of captain. In 1969, while lecturing in Norway, he was asked to lift 200 kg, which he easily did despite a year-long break in training.

== Weightlifting achievements ==
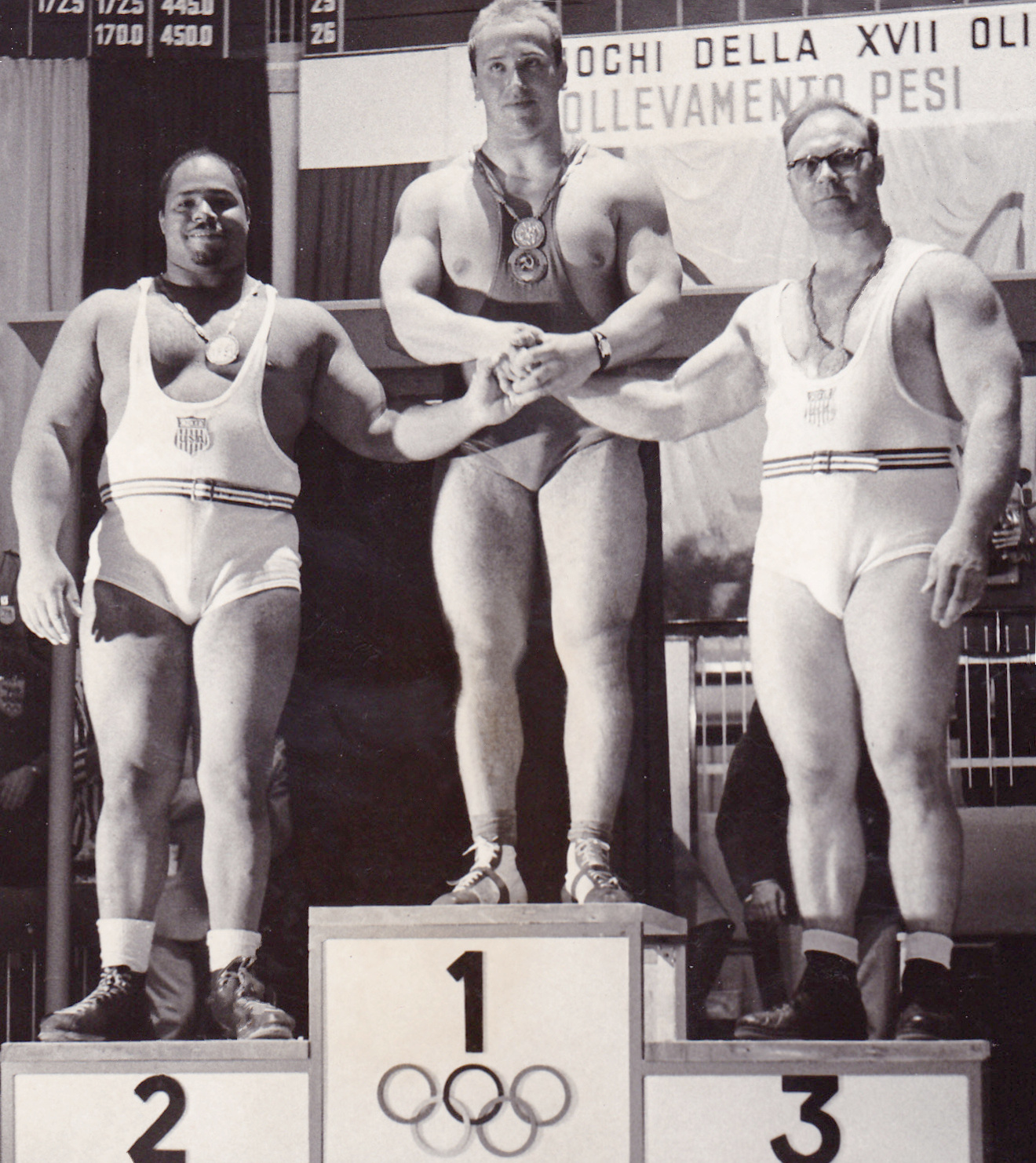
Vlasov (center) at the Olympic podium in 1960 with his gold medal

- Olympic champion (1960); silver medalist in 1964;
- Four-time world champion (1959, 1961–1963); silver medalist in 1964;
- Six-time consecutive European champion (1959–1964);
- Set thirty four world records.

== Legacy and awards ==
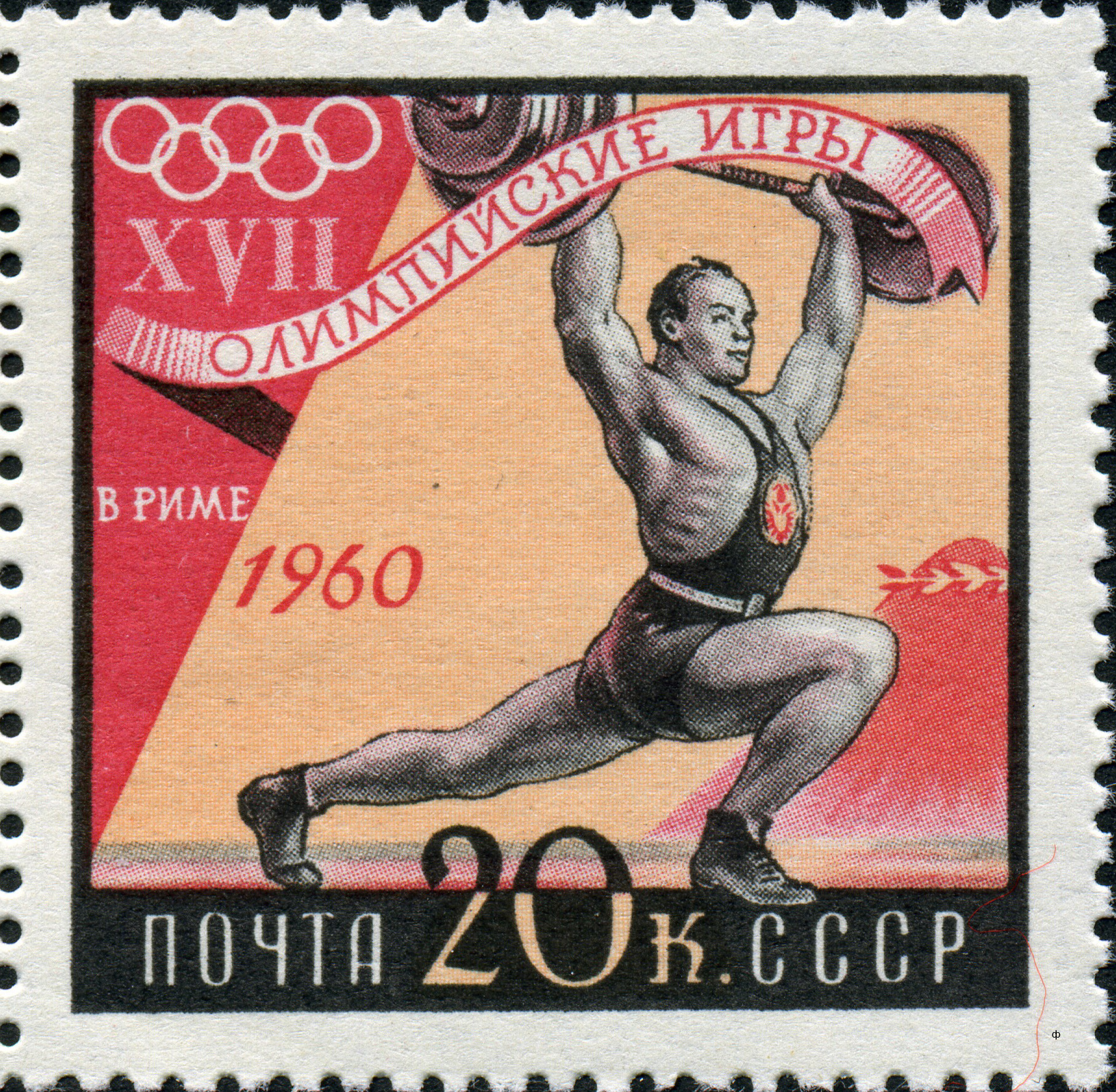
A 1960 Soviet postal stamp dedicated to Vlasov's victory at the 1960 Olympic Games

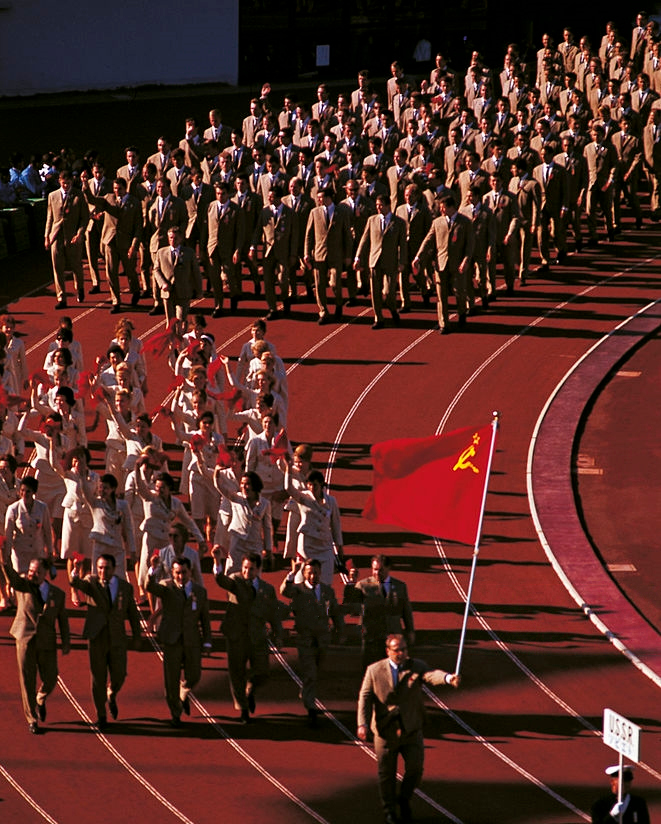
Vlasov heading the Soviet team at the 1964 Olympics

At the peak of his popularity Vlasov was frequently included in international delegations visiting foreign leaders, such as Fidel Castro and Charles de Gaulle. He was a favorite of Nikita Khrushchev; Leonid Brezhnev offered him a position of a personal adviser on China, and Yuri Andropov was supervising his book The Vladimirov diaries: Yenan, China, 1942–1945 as it involved Soviet intelligence activities.

Arnold Schwarzenegger, seven-times Mr. Olympia, considered Vlasov as a major motivation for his career as a bodybuilder and a strongman. They first met at the 1961 World Championships in Vienna when Schwarzenegger was only 14. Vlasov did not recall what he said to Schwarzenegger then, but remembered that he was excited after winning the championships and encouraged Schwarzenegger to continue strength training no matter what. In 1988, while filming Red Heat in Moscow, Schwarzenegger insisted on meeting Vlasov, who by then had fallen out of grace with the Soviet leaders, and gave him his photograph signed "To my Idol Yuri Vlasov".

For his weightlifting victories Vlasov was awarded the Order of Lenin (1960) and Order of the Badge of Honour (1965). He was a member of the Union of Soviet Writers and was a member of the Union of Russian Writers.

== Post-retirement sports activities ==
Vlasov's health suddenly deteriorated in 1978–1979, which was related to a nervous breakdown due to his writing activities but not to weightlifting. Later he had a few surgeries on his spine. In the 1980s he returned to sport as a functionary – between 1985 and 1987 he was president of the Soviet Weightlifting Federation, and from 1987 to 1989 headed the Soviet Bodybuilding Federation. As a dope-free athlete he was stunned by the massive use of anabolic steroids by weightlifters and bodybuilders in those years.

Vlasov continued training with weights through most of his life. In 2004, aged 69, he took part in a masters competition in Moscow and lifted 185 kg in the clean and jerk event. By then he lowered his body weight to 109 kg, while his maximum senior weight was 136.4 kg at the 1964 Olympics.

== Writing ==
Vlasov became a professional writer and journalist years before his retirement from competitions – his short stories were published by Soviet newspapers back in 1959. In 1961 he won a prize for best sports story from the Union of Soviet Writers. Starting from the 1962 European Championships, he was attending international competitions not only as a weightlifter, but also as a special correspondent to the major Soviet newspaper Izvestia. Before the 1964 Olympics he published his first book, a collection of short stories titled Overcoming Yourself.

After retiring both from competition and military service, in 1968 Vlasov dedicated himself to writing. He published over 15 novels, most notably the Flaming Cross trilogy (1991–93) about life during and after the Russian Revolution, and more than 10 short story collections. His books were translated into several languages, including English. In 1973 he edited and published his father's diaries titled The Vladimirov diaries: Yenan, China, 1942–1945, which were translated into six languages, including English and Chinese. In that book, Vlasov uses the pen name of his father, Vladimirov.

Other books by Vlasov include:

- Себя преодолеть. — М.: Молодая гвардия, 1964. — 270 с. / Overcome Yourself
- Формула мужества. — М.: Знание, 1987. — 94 с. / The Formula for Courage
- Справедливость силы. — Л.: Лениздат, 1989. — 608 с. — ISBN 978-5-289-00374-4 / The Justice of Strength
- Геометрия чувств. — Киев: Ленинградский комитет литераторов, 1991. — 256 с. / The Geometry of Feelings
- Стечение сложных обстоятельств. — М.: «Советский спорт», 1990. — 18 с. — ISBN 5-278-0025-6 / Confluence of Difficult Circumstances
- Огненный Крест: в 3-х кн. — М.: Прогресс, Культура 1993. — ISBN 978-5-01-003925-7 / Flaming Cross: 3 vol.
- Русь без вождя. — Воронеж: Воронежская областная организация Союза писателей России, 1995. — 528 с. — ISBN 978-5-86742-027-7 / Rus' Without a Chieftain
- Мы есть и будем. — Воронеж: Издательство Воронежской областной типографии, 1996. — 718 с. — ISBN 978-5-87456-058-4 / We Are and Will Be
- Временщики. — М.: Детектив-Пресс, 1999. — 464 с. — ISBN 978-5-89935-002-3 / Timeservers
- Красные валеты. — М.: Алгоритм, 2005. — 360 с. — ISBN 978-5-9265-0233-3 / Red Jacks
- 93-й. Год великого поражения. — М.: Алгоритм, 2006. — 288 с. — ISBN 978-5-9265-0246-3 / 1993: The Year of the Great Defeat
- Великий Передел: в 2-х кн. — М.: ДПК Пресс, 2011. / The Great Repartition: 2 vol.

== Politics ==
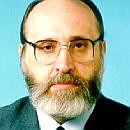
Vlasov in 1993

Vlasov was elected to the Congress of People's Deputies for the Lublinsky district of Moscow in 1989 and broke from the Communist Party.

In 1993, Vlasov was elected to the State Duma of the Russian Federation. He unsuccessfully sought to be elected chairman of the 1st State Duma.

Vlasov's tenure in the State Duma saw him take a strong departure from his earlier politics. However, he moved away from liberal politics and adopted the policies of nationalists and Christian Democrats. During his Soviet political career, and his very early Duma career, Vlasov had been supportive of democratic reforms. When he first entered the Duma, Vlasov was a member of the liberal Inter-regional Deputies Group, along with Andrei Sakharov, Anatoly Sobchak and Boris Yeltsin. However, as a member of the Duma, Vlasov subsequently strongly embraced authoritarian policies. Ultimately, Vlasov's post-Soviet politics would be characterized as nationalist. It would also feature prominent antisemitic rhetoric.

=== Presidential campaign ===
Vlasov ran as an independent candidate in the 1996 Russian presidential election. During his presidential campaign, Vlasov promoted himself as patriot fighting both communism and an alleged "Zionist conspiracy" against the Russian people. He dubbed his politics as "people's patriotism". He also likened his politics to Gaullism. He claimed that his politics were a more effective unifying force than communist or democratic ideals. His campaign platform proclaimed, "There is only one single force that is able to unite almost all and at the same time become the ideological basis of the Russian state – popular patriotism".

Vlasov alleged that Yeltsin's policies had pushed 40% of Russia's populace below the poverty line and brought the government only 3% of the real value of privatized state property. Vlasov accused the Communists of stealing many of his ideas, including the name of his People's Patriotic Party, as Communist Party nominee Gennady Zyuganov had taken to referring to himself the leader of a "coalition of popular-patriotic forces". Vlasov's campaign saw very little media coverage. While he was nominally an independent candidate, his campaign was supported by the People's National Party. However, by the end of the election, many in the party grew dissatisfied with his campaign style, believing he failed to campaign aggressively enough.

Despite the fact that he was polling at under one percent, Vlasov had stated that he anticipated capturing between six and seven percent of the vote. He pledged to refuse to support either Yeltsin or Zyuganov in the runoff. Ultimately, Vlasov received only 0.20% of the vote in the first round of the election. Following his presidential defeat, Vlasov retired from politics.

== Personal life ==
Vlasov had a brother Boris. He first married in 1957, to Natalia Modorova, a student of the Moscow Institute of Arts who was visiting his gym to draw athletes. They had a daughter Yelena. Vlasov remarried in 1976, after the death of his first wife, to Larisa Sergeyevna Vlasova, a student 21 years his junior. In his memoirs Vlasov mentions that he had another daughter, perhaps with Larisa. According to his 1960 Olympic teammate Boris Nikonorov, Vlasov spoke fluent English at the Rome Olympics. Vlasov underwent several surgeries, with the final surgery occurring in 2019 or 2020. He fully recovered some time afterwards, and had no illnesses.

Vlasov died of natural causes on 13 February 2021, in Moscow, Russia.
