= Indigo (Warner novel) =

1992 novel by Marina Warner

- First edition (UK)
- Author: Marina Warner
- Publisher: Chatto & Windus (UK); Simon & Schuster (US)
- Publication date: September 1, 1992
- ISBN: 0-671-70156-8 (US edition)

Indigo is a 1992 novel written by Marina Warner, published by Chatto & Windus in the UK and Simon & Schuster in the US. It is a modernized and altered retelling of William Shakespeare's The Tempest.

Within the novel, Warner appropriates Shakespeare's original plot and characters to fit a dual reality, spanning the 17th and 20th centuries, and the colonial sphere of the Caribbean alongside post-colonial London. She expands certain characters: for example, Sycorax, Shakespeare's dark witch, is given her own identity as indigo maker and village sage. The colonialist realities of 'discovery' and the conquering of 'new' lands are played out in the novel's first section. Finally, the characters of Miranda and Caliban (recreated as Dulé and George/Shaka) are unified in a shared acknowledgement of past colonial wrongs.
