= Joan of Arc: The Image of Female Heroism =

1981 book by Marina Warner

- Author: Marina Warner
- Publisher: University of California Press
- Publication date: 1981
- ISBN: 0-520-22464-7

Joan of Arc: the Image of Female Heroism by Marina Warner (University of California Press, 1981 ISBN 0-520-22464-7) is a book about Joan of Arc, focusing on how she has been perceived by others over the centuries and how that perception has shaped her image.

== Reception ==
The book has been reviewed in Newsweek, The New York Review of Books, the Chicago Sun-Times, and the American Historical Review.

Anne Llewellyn Barstow, in The American Historical Review, thought that Warner didn't do enough to contextualise Joan in her historical context. Caroline Walker Bynum, writing in Church History, called the work "self-indulgent and badly written".
