= The Vladimirov Diaries =

Book by Peter Vladimirov

The Vladimirov diaries: Yenan, China, 1942-1945
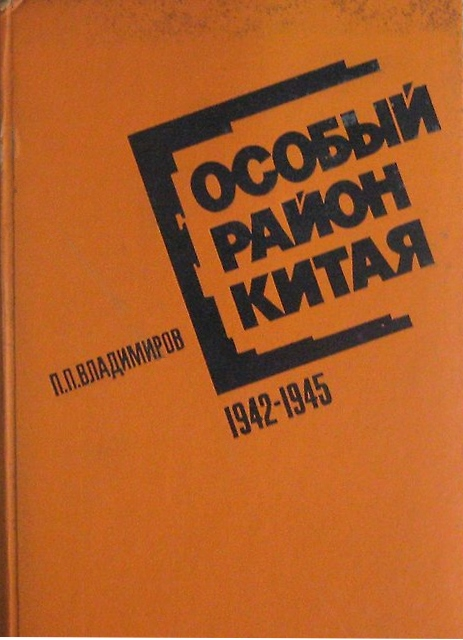
- Editor: Yury Vlasov
- Author: Peter Vladimirov
- Original title: Особый район Китая. 1942—1945
- Language: Russian
- Published: 1973, Novosti
- Publication place: Soviet Union
- English publication date: 1975, Doubleday
- Media type: Print
- Pages: 656
- ISBN: 0-385-00928-3

The Vladimirov diaries: Yenan, China, 1942-1945 was a book written by Soviet diplomat Peter Vladimirov; it was published by his son Yury Vlasov in 1973, twenty years after Vladimirov's death. The book recounts the events in Yan'an during the Second World War, particularly information on Mao Zedong.

Vladimirov died in 1953. His son Yury Vlasov edited his diaries and published the book in 1973. It was then translated to a local language and reprinted in Vietnam (1973), India (1974), United States (1975), Japan (1975), Czechoslovakia (1975), Taiwan (1976), East Germany (1976) and China (2004). The diary was personally supervised by Yury Andropov; it has been criticized in mainland China as having been edited for Soviet propaganda purposes. It is censored by the PRC's Great Firewall.
