= Mama Lola =

Haitian-born manbo priestess

Marie Thérèse Alourdes Macena Margaux Kowalski (1933–2020), also known by the name Mama Lola, was a Haitian-born manbo (priestess) in the African diasporic religion of Haitian Vodou. She had lived in the United States since 1963.

Born in Port-au-Prince, Mama Lola descended from multiple generations of manbos and oungans (Haitian Vodou priests). She took up the duties of a manbo herself when she was in her early thirties after she had moved to the United States. She was a highly regarded healer, ritualizer, and spiritual guide in a close-knit community of Haitian immigrants in New York City and their networks along the eastern seaboard and abroad by the time she met anthropologist and religious studies scholar Karen McCarthy Brown in 1978. The best-known collaboration between Mama Lola and Brown over the course of their more than thirty-year friendship and research relationship is Mama Lola: A Vodou Priestess in Brooklyn, a 1991 book about Mama Lola's religious practices and the Haitian and U.S. cultural context of her life.

Mama Lola emerged as a more public figure as she continued working with her close friend and collaborator Brown in subsequent academic projects and publications and the arts and culture sectors. Importantly, she deepened and expanded her own networks in Caribbean New York and Eastern Canada, the Haitian diaspora, Afro-diasporic religious and cultural centers throughout the United States, and among people unfamiliar with Vodou yet drawn to her as her extended spiritual family grew and she gained greater visibility.

== Biography ==
=== Early life ===
Mama Lola was born in Port-au-Prince, Haiti. She was the fourth and youngest child of Philomise Macena, a manbo originally from Jean-Rabel. Macena was a well-respected manbo in Port-au-Prince by the time Mama Lola was born. Mama Lola’s biological father, Alphonse "Pèpe" Champagne, was largely absent during her childhood. Until she was able to develop a significant relationship with him, she used her mother's surname (Macena).

Mama Lola resided for most of her childhood and early adolescence with fictive kin and other relatives on her mother’s side of the family, first moving in with a foster mother as a toddler, and then living with her oldest brother and his wife during her later childhood and early adolescence. After she became pregnant with her first son “Jean Pierre” (pseudonym) at age fourteen through a relationship with another teenager, she moved from her brother and sister-in-law's home to her mother’s house in the Bas-Peu-de-Chose neighborhood of Port-au-Prince.

At fifteen years old, Mama Lola successfully rehearsed to become a singer in the Troupe Folklorique Nationale (National Folklore Troupe of Haiti), a state-sponsored folkloric choir and dance troupe that promoted a nationalist version of indigenous Haitian culture and history--especially of Vodou--in Haiti and abroad. Although she performed sacred songs for the Troupe, she had not taken formal steps to become initiated into Vodou, having largely observed her mother's spiritual and ceremonial work from a distance.

Mama Lola met a photographer travelling with the troupe while on tour and eventually became his steady girlfriend. This partner helped her set up her own household where she lived with her son and their daughter Maggie.

Around this time, Mama Lola reconnected with her biological father and started to use his last name. He disapproved of her arrangement with Maggie's father. In a move to meet his expectations of respectability, she agreed to accept the marriage proposal of a small business owner who had approached her at a church. At the time of the wedding, her son and daughter were in middle childhood and toddlerhood respectively. Soon afterward, her husband insisted that she quit singing with the troupe. Although she acquiesced, he became increasingly abusive to the point that she decided to leave him.

Mama Lola's financial situation deteriorated severely after her separation from her husband and at a time when working women were often pressured into bartering sex for job opportunities. She both exchanged sex for the promise of work and for remuneration at her dates' discretion as a marijak (Marie-Jacques) for several years. Through a romantic relationship with a friend who was not a client, she became pregnant with her third child, "William" (pseudonym) but did not receive his help to raise their child. She eventually started a loving long term relationship with a taxi driver with stable work. With his support, she was able to stop doing sex work and plan for alternative ways to supplement his income. She asked her brother "Jean" (pseudonym) in the United States for a small amount of money to set up her own business and he instead offered to sponsor her immigration into the United States. She then made the weighty decision to leave her partner with whom she had been living for three years and emigrate in search of opportunity.

=== Move to the United States ===
In 1963, Mama Lola moved to Brooklyn, New York, and her three children stayed with her mother. Her first year was filled with hardship and uncertainty. She was hospitalized two different times with a severe intestinal infection of unknown origin and administered last rites by the priest at the hospital each time. "Yvonne Constant" (pseudonym), a family friend, came to her rescue when she was discharged from the hospital for the second time and invited her to live in her home. Mama Lola's sister-in-law in New York told her about a vivid dream which Mama Lola interpreted as a message from Azaka, one of the lwas (Vodou spirits), to seek treatment in Haiti. With additional help from "Constant" who gave her the necessary funds, she visited her mother Philomise. Soon after her arrival in the house, Philomise fell into a trance state (spirit possession) and the lwa Papa Ogou told Mama Lola that she undertake the highest level of initiation of priesthood, to take the ason and be allowed to use this special ritual rattle, in order to do spirit work. She took the first steps to become a manbo during that same trip and made a promise to raise the necessary money to complete the next stages of initiation in the priesthood in the future.

After she returned to Brooklyn, her ability to secure a job at the laundry of a senior facility struck her as fortuitous. Approximately a year later, she was able to have her three children immigrate and live with her in Brooklyn. Struggling through adversity, she nonetheless raised the required funds to return to Haiti in 1966 in order to complete the initiation to become a manbo asogwe. In New York, her sacred singing and healing practices as a manbo attracted a growing number of clients with whom she did spirit work throughout the eastern United States, eastern Canada, Caribbean, and Central America. The money she earned through spirit work at first supplemented her income from low-paying jobs until she was able to earn enough work exclusively as a practitioner out of her home. By the late 1970s, Mama Lola owned her house in the Fort Greene area of Brooklyn where she lived with three generations of her extended family.

=== Work with Karen McCarthy Brown ===
In 1978, Mama Lola met Karen McCarthy Brown, an anthropologist who was then working for the Brooklyn Museum on an ethnographic survey of the local Haitian immigrant community. They were introduced by Brown's close Haitian friend of many years, Theodore Buteau. Brown had been conducting research in Haiti since 1973 and earned her PhD in 1976 from Temple University but she considered the first meeting with Mama Lola as her introduction to spiritual leaders in the Haitian diasporic community of New York City.

After three years of research and friendship with Mama Lola and her family, Brown underwent initiation into Haitian Vodou in the Carrefour area of Haiti and became Mama Lola's spiritual daughter. One of Brown's first publications about her experiences with Mama Lola was a 1987 article in the Journal of Feminist Studies in Religion. Brown addressed the process behind her writing and inserting herself as a character in her publications as a way "to allow readers to see my point of view (another term for bias) and make their own judgments about it"; to do justice to Mama Lola's story and include specific intimate details that Mama Lola deemed important; and to counter the "distorted image" of Vodou. After additional articles and book chapters in anthologies, Brown wrote the book-length Mama Lola: A Vodou Priestess in Brooklyn which she described as "ethnographic spiritual biography" with "fictionalized short stories" based on stories of Mama Lola's late family members and ancestors. For the first edition of her book, Brown agreed to Mama Lola's request to protect her and her family's privacy by using pseudonyms and photos in which they could not be identified. Accordingly, Brown referred to Mama Lola as "Marie Thérèse Alourdes Macena Margaux Kowalski" and "Alourdes". Before the publication of the book, Mama Lola did not use the name "Mama Lola" outside the context of her family where small children used it to affectionately address her as their older relative. The publication of the book popularized the appellation, and she began using customized "Mama Lola, Voodoo Priestess" business cards as she emerged as a more public figure in the 1990s.

The book Mama Lola won many awards, including the American Anthropological Association's Victor Turner Prize and the American Academy of Religion's prize for best first book in the History of Religions. After the book's publication, both Brown and Mama Lola were invited to speak at various colleges, universities, and arts and culture venues. As Brown explained, Mama Lola became "something of a celebrity" where she was sought out for public engagements and spiritual work by a broad range of people. Often Maggie accompanied Brown and Mama Lola's post-book publication activities and demonstrated resourcefulness and leadership. Their activities included their participation as a special delegation in 1993 at the invitation of the president of Benin Nicephore Soglo to a two-week-long series of events commemorating called "Reunion of Vodun Cultures", where Mama Lola formed what became a lasting friendship with the late Daagbo Hounon Houna (1916–2004), the Supreme Chef of Vodun in Ouidah, and their serving on the advisory board and lecture circuit for the 1995 "The Sacred Arts of Haitian Vodou" exhibition held at the UCLA Fowler Museum of Cultural History. In a shorter 1999 article, chapter in a 2001 anthology, and the 2001 edition's afterword, Brown described challenges and changes in her relationship with Mama Lola as they increasingly participated in public events together that celebrated Mama Lola's role as a transnational leader of African diasporic religious traditions and emergent spiritual practices and highlighted the legacy of transatlantic slavery and impact of contemporary racism.

Mama Lola's identity was slowly revealed in publications during this time as well. Various publications from different authors until 1995 referred to Mama Lola either through the pseudonym used in the Brown's well-known book ("Marie Thérèse Alourdes Macena Margaux Kowalski") or included the shortened form of Mama Lola's full legal name (Alourdes Champagne) which Mama Lola preferred to use herself. Brown consistently used pseudonyms for Mama Lola and her family members and only used photographs that protected the identities of Mama Lola and her relatives. The publication of the Sacred Arts of Haitian Vodou book on the exhibit revealed more about Mama Lola's identity, including photographs of her person. Brown revealed further details about Mama Lola's identity in the 2001 updated and expanded edition of Mama Lola with a new preface, afterword, and ten pages of photos inclusive of previously unpublished images of her and many of her family members. Mama Lola had explicitly requested that Brown include her full legal name in the 2001 edition. In an agreement with the family, Brown also disclosed the real names of her daughter Maggie and granddaughter Marsha.

Through Brown's retirement in 2009 and her prolonged struggle with Alzheimer's disease until her death in 2015, her relationships with Mama Lola and her family remained profound. The Congress of Santa Barbara (KOSANBA), a scholarly association for the study of Haitian Vodou, undertook "the project that was closest to Karen's heart" of translating Mama Lola into French and thus making it and Mama Lola's story accessible to a broader audience of readers in Haiti and the French-speaking world (projected publication date in 2022).

=== Recognition in the Haitian Diaspora and Beyond ===
By the mid-1990s, Mama Lola and her family were well-established in Flatbush, Brooklyn. Unlike her home in Fort Greene in the late 1970s and early 1980s—then described by Brown as the only house of a Haitian family on the block—Mama Lola's Flatbush home was in an area with a well-established Haitian and Haitian American population and regarded as a hub of West Indian cultural life. Indeed, Mama Lola's home was in an area of Flatbush that came to be designated as the "Little Haiti Business and Cultural District" in 2018. Her community of spiritual children included many people from other parts of the Caribbean on the East Coast of the US and eastern Canada and grew thereafter. Mama Lola also maintained direct close ties to her homeland, insisting on conducting higher-level initiations only in Haiti and visiting often until the January 12, 2010 Haiti earthquake.

Mama Lola received broad recognition by New York-based community organizations and institutions that celebrate African American and Caribbean women's leadership and Haitian cultural heritage. She continued to participate in related events at local universities through 2011.

Mama Lola's family, spiritual children, and close friends introduced her to trusted networks of practitioners of Vodou, New Orleans Voodoo, Santería, Vodun, and other African and African diasporic traditional religions. Through word-of-mouth or gatherings at various spiritual centers and private homes, Lola welcomed more devotees into her spiritual family and integrated other faith practices into her spiritual life and work.

By the mid-1990s, Mama Lola had developed very close relationships with Santería practitioners based out of the San Francisco Bay Area. She guided their initiation into Vodou and joined them as a fellow santera (female initiate) in 2000. Among her closest Santería friends were priestesses in Oakland with whom she would visit, participate in cultural activities and ceremonies locally, and undertake healing work.

In the late 1990s, Mama Lola was introduced by a friend to a New Orleans Voodoo practitioner who had established a cultural center years before that was devoted to local Voodoo and its broader connections with the arts and spiritual practices in Western Africa and throughout the African diaspora. This practitioner soon became one of Lola's spiritual daughters. By the early 2000s, Lola would stay in New Orleans to spend time with this part of her spiritual family and participate in spiritual consultation services, healing work, worship, and cultural events hosted by the Voodoo Authentica Cultural Center & Collection. She divided her time between Brooklyn and New Orleans and joined Voodoo Authentica's annual VOODOOFEST on Halloween, a free festival since 1998 that celebrates, educates, and preserves voodoo traditions in New Orleans, and culminates in an ancestral healing ceremony on behalf of the city. (This festival is separate from the Voodoo Music + Arts Experience inaugurated in 1999 and sometimes referred to as "Voodoo Fest".) Mama Lola became a public face of Haitian Vodou in New Orleans through additional relationships Voodoo Authentica had cultivated and sustained over the years. For example, Mama Lola presided over services to the lwa, sacred singing, and a panel on the connections between Haitian Vodou and New Orleans Voodoo with manbos from New York and Haiti at the 2011 New Orleans Jazz and Heritage Festival.

=== Later life ===
Mama Lola gradually withdrew from public life as her daughter Maggie, her granddaughter Marsha, her close manbo and oungan friends, and her pitit fèys (spiritual children) took on some of the duties she once performed in New York, Haiti, and New Orleans. She died in 2020 at the age of 87 years old. Her legacy continues to be celebrated by her family, spiritual children, and friends.
