= Wayne Proudfoot =

American scholar of religion (born 1939)

- Born: Wayne Lee Proudfoot; November 17, 1939 (age 86)

Academic background
- Education: Harvard University

Academic work
- Discipline: Religious studies
- Institutions: Columbia University
- Main interests: Religious experience
- Influenced: George Lindbeck

Wayne Lee Proudfoot (born November 17, 1939) is an American scholar of religion and has written several works in that field, specializing in the philosophy of religion.

Proudfoot earned the degree of Master of Theology from the Harvard Divinity School in 1969, after which he taught at the College of Liberal Arts at the Lincoln Center campus of Fordham University in midtown Manhattan.

Proudfoot subsequently earned the degree of Doctorate of Philosophy from Harvard University (1972) and became a Professor of Religion at Columbia University. He has written several books about religious experience, most notably a book with that title. He has also published articles on Charles Peirce and William James.

== Works ==
- Faithful Imagining: Essays in Honor of Richard R. Niebuhr / edited By Sang Hyun Lee, Wayne Proudfoot, Albert Blackwell (Atlanta: Scholars Press, c1995) ISBN 9780788500268
- God and the Self: Three Types of Philosophy of Religion (Lewisburg, Pennsylvania: Bucknell University Press, c1976) ISBN 9780838717691
- Religious Experience (Berkeley: University of California Press, c1985) ISBN 9780520061286
- (editor) William James and a Science of Religions: Reexperiencing the Varieties of Religious Experience (New York: Columbia University Press, c2004)
