= Weidenfeld-Hoffmann Trust =

University of Oxford scholarship programme

The Weidenfeld-Hoffmann Trust is an educational charity founded by the late Lord Weidenfeld and André Hoffmann in 2014. The Weidenfeld-Hoffmann Trust runs the Weidenfeld-Hoffmann Scholarships and Leadership Programme at the University of Oxford. The scholarship is one of the most prestigious scholarships at the University of Oxford. The Trust awards around thirty-five scholarships each year for graduates and early career professionals from mainly developing and emerging economies to study at the University of Oxford. The programme aims to provide the knowledge, skills and network to enhance talent and create opportunities for future global leaders. The Weidenfeld-Hoffmann and Oxford-Hoffmann Scholarships are the largest philanthropic scholarships supported by the University of Oxford. Since 2007, over 500 scholarships have been awarded to recipients from around 100 different countries.

== Founding and supporters ==
George Weidenfeld, of Chelsea GBE, a distinguished publisher, founded the Weidenfeld Scholarships and Leadership Programme at the Institute of Strategic Dialogue in London. In 2014 the Weidenfeld-Hoffmann Trust was established, and an Endowment Fund was launched in 2015, in honour of Lord Weidenfeld's 95th Birthday. This new matched funding initiative raised £15 million. Oxford University contributed 40% of the funds with 60% donated by supporters and friends of the Weidenfeld-Hoffmann Trust, including a generous gift of £5 million from Swiss Businessman, philanthropist, and Trust first chairman André Hoffmann. In 2017, to celebrate the tenth anniversary of the Scholarships and Leadership Programme. To mark the tenth anniversary of the Programme, André Hoffmann made a further donation of £9 million match funded by £6 million from the University. This provision will support c 30 scholarships every year in perpetuity. In 2021 the Trust was made a member of the Chancellor's Court of Benefactors in recognition of its significant contribution to the University of Oxford. The Trust also supports scholarships through partnerships with Chevening UK and with individual Oxford Colleges including Hertford College, Keble College, Lincoln College, Mansfield College, St Antony's College, St Edmund Hall, St John's College, Trinity College, and Worcester College. Previous partnerships have included the Louis Dreyfus Foundation, Annenberg Foundation, Arcadia Fund and Fondation Hoffmann.

== Eligibility and selection ==
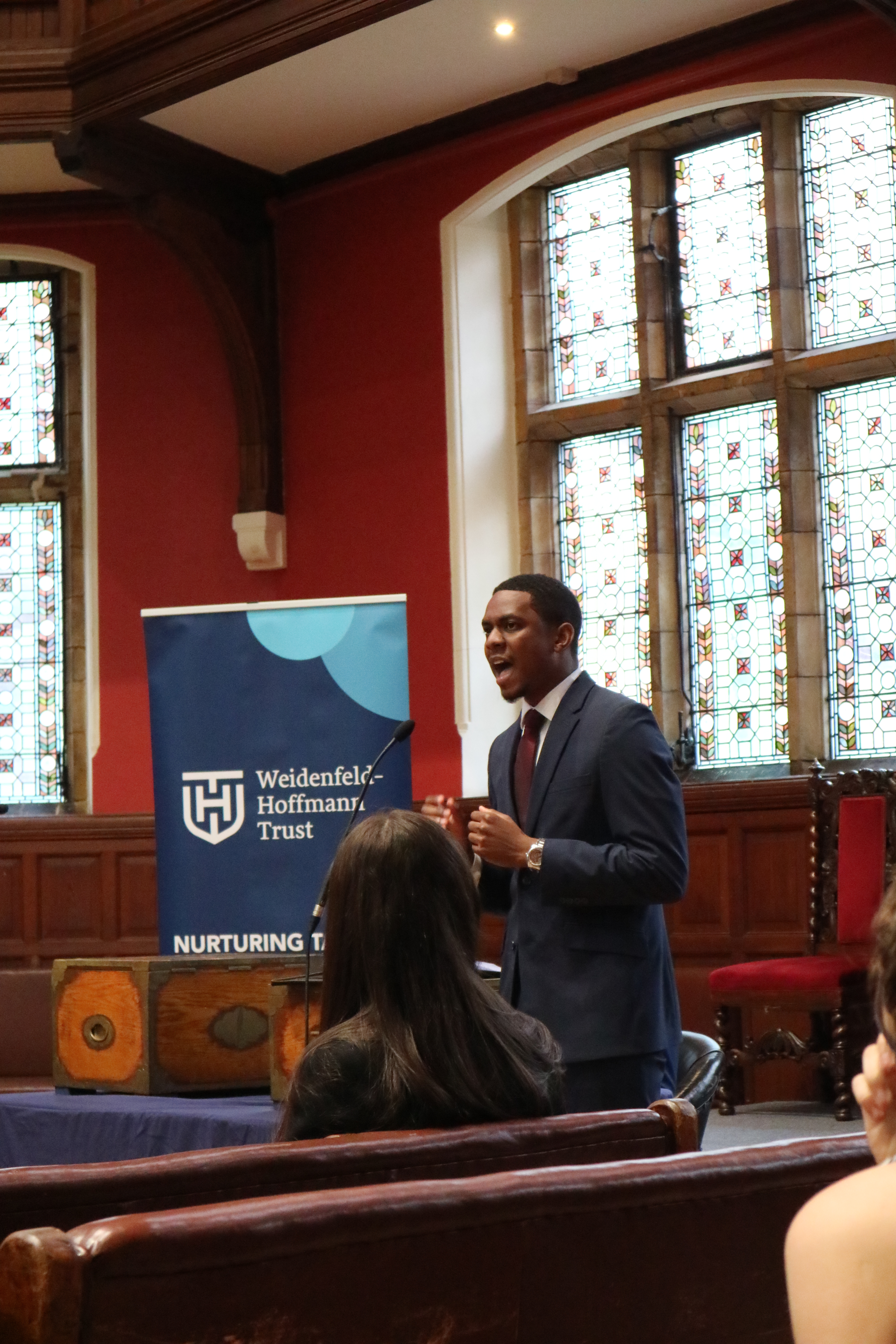
WHT Annual Debate, Oxford Union, 2021

Scholarships are open to exceptional graduates and early-stage professionals mainly from emerging and developing economies who intend to return to their countries of origin once their studies are complete. Around 35 1-year master’s courses are supported mainly from the social sciences but include many cross-disciplinary subjects. Applicants are required to demonstrate a connection between their course of study and longer-term career objectives and how this relates to addressing global challenges or the improvement of public life in their country of origin or at a wider regional or international level. The scholarship covers 100% of course fees, a full grant for living costs and the costs of the Leadership Programme. Applicants complete a questionnaire and are interviewed by University of Oxford academics and WHT supporters and alumni.

== Humanitas Programme ==
The Trust was also home to the Humanitas Programme, (2010–2020), a network of Visiting Professorships run in partnership with the University of Oxford, the Oxford Research Centre in the Humanities (TORCH) and the University of Cambridge (CRASSH). The Programme invited experts and practitioners from around the world on short-term visiting professorships to address major themes in the arts, humanities and social sciences. Its illustrated lecture and masterclass by pianist Mitsuko Uchida has been viewed nearly 300,000 times In March 2024 Joyce DiDonato was the Humanitas Visiting Professor in Voice and Classical Music.
