= Karen McCarthy Brown =

American anthropologist (1942–2015)

Karen McCarthy Brown (August 12, 1942 – March 4, 2015) was an anthropologist specializing in the anthropology of religion. She is best known for her groundbreaking book Mama Lola: A Vodou Priestess in Brooklyn, which made great strides in destigmatizing Haitian Vodou. Until her retirement in 2009 due to illness, McCarthy Brown was a professor of anthropology at Drew University. At Drew University, McCarthy Brown was the first woman in the Theological School to receive tenure and to achieve the rank of full professor.

== Education ==
Karen McCarthy Brown graduated with honors from Smith College receiving her B.A. in 1964. She attended Union Theological Seminary and obtained her M.A. in 1966. She began her doctoral work in 1970, graduating from Temple University in 1976. Her dissertation was titled "The Veve of Haitian Vodou: A Structural Analysis of Visual Imagery."

== Field research ==
=== Haitian Vodou ===
McCarthy Brown had intermittently conducted research in Haiti since 1973. She also studied the Haitian Vodou community in Brooklyn, New York since 1978. After ten years of researching Vodou, McCarthy Brown became initiated into the religion. Her conversion occurred during a difficult time in her personal life, while she was going through a divorce. As part of her conversion, she "married" the spirit Ogoun Badagris, a spirit who embodies assertiveness, in a ceremony performed by Mama Lola.

Brown describes motivating factors for her Vodou initiation, which begins in July 1981:

...I came to believe that the surest and most direct path toward understanding Vodou's capacity to heal lay in opening more of myself to its curative powers. This realization pushed from one side. From the other I was pushed by my increasing intimacy with Alourdes as we struggled toward each other over the hurdles of race, class and culture. The genuine friendship that grew between us despite these obstacles made it increasingly difficult for me to hide myself from her. ...Actually, given Alourdes's intuitive powers, it is doubtful that I ever hid myself from her, but she had always been respectful and had never before addressed me as directly as she did that afternoon in the spring of 1981.

— Brown 1987:68-9

==== Mama Lola ====
Karen McCarthy Brown and Mama Lola, aka Marie Thérèse Alourdes Macena Champagne Lovinski (or just Alourdes), worked together for over 30 years. They were introduced in the summer of 1978 by a mutual friend, Theodore B. At the time, McCarthy Brown was working on an ethnography of the Brooklyn Haitian community for the Brooklyn Museum.

Karen McCarthy Brown's participant observer-informant relationship with Mama Lola gradually progressed into a strong friendship. McCarthy Brown is fascinated with relationships regarding "The Other," and recognizes herself as such within Vodou communities. Brown described this relationship eloquently: "When the lines long drawn in anthropology between participant-observer and informant break down, the only truth is the one in between; and anthropology becomes something closer to a social art form, open to both aesthetic and moral judgment. This situation is riskier, but it does bring intellectual labor and life into closer relation."

Mama Lola: A Vodou Priestess in Brooklyn, a biography of Marie Thérèse Alourdes Macena Champagne Lovinski, is arguably McCarthy Brown's most important contribution to the field of anthropology. Through it, she brought attention to the widespread practice and validity of the Vodou religion, helping to begin to break down ignorant negative associations with Vodou. The book explores and renders moot dichotomies of urban vs. rural, academic vs. illiterate, and developed vs. underdeveloped that unsuccessfully seek to oversimplify encounters between the West and "The Other." Furthermore, McCarthy Brown portrays the complex influences that affect Haitian women's lives in general, and the personal experiences of Alourdes and her family, in particular. McCarthy Brown is aware of her own role in Alourde's life as ethnographer and friend, and makes her own influence, potential misunderstandings, and "Otherness" refreshingly transparent.

McCarthy Brown won the 1992 Victor Turner Prize in Ethnographic Writing by the Society for Humanistic Anthropology, American Anthropological Association, for Mama Lola: A Vodou Priestess in Brooklyn. The book was also awarded as the 1991 Best First Book in the History of Religion by the American Academy of Religion.

=== Drew Newark Project ===
Karen McCarthy Brown created and directed the Drew Newark Project, funded by the Ford Foundation. This was a ten-year-long religion mapping project with minority students from Drew University in Newark, New Jersey. The students collected oral histories of religion in their urban communities.

=== Other research ===
McCarthy Brown has written about the political murals that were created in Haiti in response to Jean-Bertrand Aristide's return in 1994. She has also conducted research in the People's Republic of Benin.

== Feminism ==
McCarthy Brown could also be described as a feminist anthropologist. She has written about gender roles in Christianity, as well as about women's roles in other spiritual and healing practices. McCarthy Brown first became involved in feminism in 1970, the year that she started as a doctoral student at Temple University. She did not learn about it in school, but through her own reading and conversations with female students. She cites Simone de Beauvoir as a very formative feminist author for her, especially relating to her description of woman as "other."

In my own work I have tried to uncover the positive dimensions of this otherness, as many members of marginalized groups have redefined negative labels. And so, along with increased social consciousness, my discovery of feminism marked the beginning of an ongoing conversation with myself as "other." I think of this as a conversation between my socially created self (the one that is familiar, public, recognized and rewarded) and my "other"-the real me or the potential me. The apparent confusion created by offering real and potential selves as equivalents is one I have no intention of resolving. In fact it is a bit of confusion I find particularly helpful in avoiding a feminist version of positivism.

== Career ==
Karen McCarthy Brown taught at Temple University, Barnard College, the University of California-Berkeley, Harvard Divinity School, Connecticut College, Rutgers University, the Western College for Women, and Drew University. She has also been a Fulbright Fellow at the University of Copenhagen in Denmark.

Along with Mama Lola and her daughter Maggie, Brown was invited to speak at several academic lectures following the success of the book Mama Lola: A Vodou Priestess in Brooklyn. The first of these lectures was in the fall of 1992 at a small college in upstate New York. A pivotal ethnographic art exhibition in their respective careers was Donald J. Cosentino's "The Sacred Arts of Haitian Vodou," sponsored by the UCLA Fowler Museum of Cultural History. The three were on the advisory committee for the exhibition, and later gave a lecture and gallery tour. They also lectured for the same exhibit a year later when it was shown at the Baltimore Museum of Art. In 1993, the president of the People's Republic of Benin, Nicephore Soglo, invited Mama Lola, her daughter Maggie, and Karen McCarthy Brown to an international gathering of Vodou practitioners. In 1998, Brown presented a lecture on Vodou at the American Museum of Natural History in New York City. Karen McCarthy Brown was creating a compilation of her works on religion for Duke University Press before her retirement due to illness in 2009. Since her retirement, there has been a fundraising effort to translate Mama Lola into French.

== Publications ==
1976. The Veve of Haitian Vodou: A Structural Analysis of Visual Imagery. University Microfilms (Ann Arbor)/Temple University

1979. "Olina and Erzulie: A Woman and a Goddess in Haitian Vodou." Anima 5 (Spring 1979): 110–16.

1987. "Alourdes: A Case Study of Moral Leadership in Haitian Vodou." In Saints and Virtues, edited by John Stratton Hawley, 144–67. Berkeley: University of California Press.

1987. "Plenty Confidence in Myself: The Initiation of a White Woman Scholar into Haitian Vodou." Journal of Feminist Studies in Religion 3, no. 1 (Spring 1987): 67–76.

1987. "The Power to Heal: Reflections on Women, Religion and Medicine." In Shaping New Vision: Gender and Values in American Culture, edited by Clarissa W. Atkinson, Constance H. Buchanan, Margaret R. Miles, 123–41. Harvard Women's Studies in Religion Series. Ann Arbor, Mich.: UMI Research Press.

1989. "Afro-Caribbean Spirituality: A Haitian Case Study," in Healing and Restoring: Medicine and Health in the World's Religious Traditions, edited by Lawrence Sullivan. New York: Macmillan, 255–85.

1991. Mama Lola: A Vodou Priestess in Brooklyn Berkeley: University of California Press.

1992. "Women in African American Religions," in Tracing Common Themes: Comparative Courses in the Study of Religion (Atlanta: Scholars Press, 1992), 242.

1994. "Fundamentalism and the Control of Women," Fundamentalism and gender, Oxford: Oxford University Press.

1994. "Putting the Egg Back into the Chicken." Journal of the American Academy of Religion Vol. 62, No. 4, Settled Issues and Neglected Questions in the Study of Religion (Winter, 1994), pp. 1181–1189.

1995. Brown, Karen McCarthy, and Mama Lola. "The Altar Room: A Dialogue." In Sacred Arts of Haitian Vodou, ed. by Donald J. Cosentino, 227–39. Los Angeles: UCLA Fowler Museum of Cultural History.

1995. "Serving the Spirits: The Ritual Economy of Haitian Vodou." In Sacred Arts of Haitian Vodou, ed. by Donald J. Cosentino, 205–23. Los Angeles: UCLA Fowler Museum of Cultural History.

1996. "Altars Happen" African Arts, Vol. 29, No. 2, Special Issue: Arts of Vodou (Spring), p. 67.

1996. "Art and Resistance: Haiti's Political Murals," October 1994. African Arts. Vol. 29, No. 2, Special Issue: Arts of Vodou (Spring, 1996), p. 46-57+102

1996. Tracing the Spirit: Ethnographic Essays on Haitian Art: From the Collection of the Davenport Museum of Art.

1997. "Systematic Remembering, Systematic Forgetting: Ogou in Haiti." In Africa's Ogun: Old World and New, ed. by Sandra T. Barnes, 65–89. Bloomington: Indiana University Press.

1998. "The Moral Force Field of Haitian Vodou." In In the Face of the Facts: Moral Inquiry in American Scholarship, ed. by Richard Wightman Fox and Robert B. Westbrook. Woodrow Wilson Center Series. New York: Woodrow Center Press.

1999. "Staying Grounded in a High-Rise Building: Ecological Dissonance and Ritual Accommodation in Haitian Vodou." In Gods of the City: Religion and the American Urban Landscape, ed. by Robert A. Orsi, 79–102. Bloomington: Indiana University Press.

1999. "Telling a Life: Race, Memory, and Historical Consciousness" Anthropology and Humanism 24(2):148-154., American Anthropological Association.

1999. "Writing About 'The Other.'" In The Insider/Outsider Problem in the Study of Religion: A Reader, edited by Russell McCutcheon. 350–53. London: Cassell.

== See also ==
- Mama Lola
- Anthropology of Religion
- Feminist Anthropology
- Haitian Vodou
- Haiti
