= Chen Yung-fa =

Taiwanese historian

Chen Yung-fa (Chinese: 陳永發; pinyin: Chén Yǒngfā; born 1 September 1944) is a Taiwanese historian.

== Life and career ==
Chen was born in Chengdu, Sichuan province. He moved with his family to Taiwan in 1949. After Chen earned bachelor's and master's degrees from National Taiwan University, he completed a doctorate in history at Stanford University, and became a professor at National Taiwan University. He was elected to the Academia Sinica in 2004 and served as the director of the academy's Institute of Modern History between 2002 and 2009. He has been sought for commentary regarding the history of the Republic of China. Beginning in 2011, Chen led a project to digitalize the diarial writings of Tan Yankai.

== Selected publications ==
- Chen, Yung-fa (1986). Making Revolution: The Communist Movement in Eastern and Central China, 1937–1945. Berkeley and Los Angeles: University of California Press. ISBN 9780520050020.
- Chen, Yung-fa; Benton, Gregor (1987). Moral Economy and the Chinese Revolution. Amsterdam: Antropologisch-Sociologisch Centrum, University of Amsterdam. ISBN 9789070313180.
- Chen, Yung-fa (2001) [1998]. 中國共產革命七十年 [Seventy Years of the Communist Revolution in China]. Vol. 2. ISBN 9789570822731.
