= Setebos (disambiguation) =

Setebos is the Tehuelche god who was an unseen character in Shakespeare's The Tempest.

Setebos may also refer to:

- Caliban upon Setebos, an 1864 Robert Browning poem describing the musings of Sycorax's son, Caliban, on the god
- Setebos (moon), a moon of the planet Uranus, named for the deity in The Tempest
- Setibos, an impact crater on Umbriel, a moon of the planet Uranus, named for the deity in The Tempest
- Megaleledone setebos, an octopus of family Octopodidae
