= Megaleledone =

Conservation status
- Least Concern (IUCN 3.1)

Scientific classification
- Kingdom: Animalia
- Phylum: Mollusca
- Class: Cephalopoda
- Order: Octopoda
- Family: Megaleledonidae
- Genus: Megaleledone; Taki, 1961
- Species: M. setebos

Binomial name
- Megaleledone setebos (Robson, 1932)

Synonyms
- Graneledone setebos (Robson, 1932); Megaleledone senoi (Taki, 1961); Pareledone senoi (Taki, 1961)

Genus of octopuses

Megaleledone setebos, the giant Antarctic octopus, is a very large venomous octopus with a circum-Antarctic distribution. It grows to at least 28 cm in mantle length and 90 cm in total length. M. setebos feeds by drilling small holes in large, shelled mollusks, and then injecting its toxic saliva. The venom even works at subfreezing temperatures. Out of the known species of Antarctic octopods, Megaleledone setebos prefers to use its physical abilities over its venom to subdue prey, possibly because of its thicker skin and larger size.

The first specimen was captured from Cape Evans on Ross Island during the British Antarctic ‘Terra Nova’ Expedition in 1911-12. The specimen was subsequently described by A. L. Massy under the name Moschites sp. In 1932, zoologist Guy Coburn Robson described it as Graneledone setebos. This species was transferred to the genus Megaleledone and synonymised with Megaleledone senoi in a 2003 paper.

== Etymology ==
"Setebos" is believed to refer to the god mentioned in Shakespeare's play The Tempest, or the poem Caliban upon Setebos by Robert Browning, which contains the lines "Careth but for Setebos / The many-handed as a cuttle-fish'".
