= Frederic George Stephens =

English painter (1827–1907)

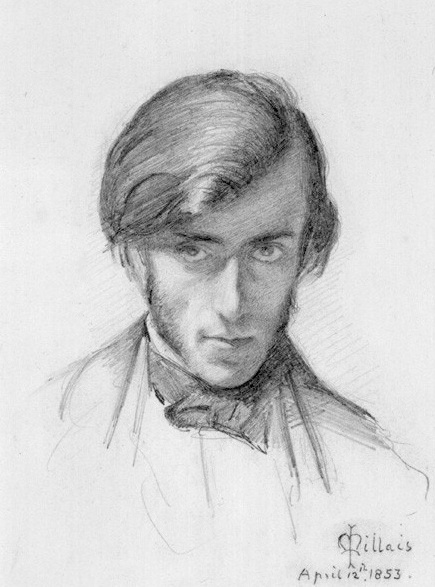
F.G. Stephens, by John Everett Millais

Frederic George Stephens (10 October 1827 – 9 March 1907) was a British art critic, and one of the two 'non-artistic' members of the Pre-Raphaelite Brotherhood.

== Life ==
Stephens was born to Septimus Stephens of Aberdeen and Ann (née Cook) in Walworth, London and grew up in nearby Lambeth. Because of an accident in 1837, he was physically disabled and was educated privately. He later attended University College School, London. In 1844 he entered the Royal Academy Schools where he first met John Everett Millais and William Holman Hunt. He joined their Pre-Raphaelite Brotherhood in 1848, often modelling for them in pictures including Millais's Ferdinand Lured by Ariel (1849) and Ford Madox Brown's Jesus Washing Peter's Feet (1852–1856; Tate, London). There is a pencil portrait of Stephens by Millais dated 1853 in the collection of the National Portrait Gallery.

Stephens was so disappointed by his own artistic talent that he took up art criticism and stopped painting. In later life he claimed to have destroyed all his paintings, but three of them are now in the Tate Gallery, London: The Proposal (The Marquis and Griselda) (1850–51), Morte d'Arthur (1849), and Mother and Child (circa 1854–1856), along with a pencil drawing of his stepmother Dorothy (1850), a study for an oil portrait he exhibited at the Royal Academy in 1852. He also exhibited a portrait of his father (1852–53) at the Academy in 1854. A large pen-and-ink drawing illustrating a subject from Geoffrey Chaucer's The Pardoner's Tale, Dethe and the Riotours (1848–1854), which he gave to Dante Gabriel Rossetti in 1854, is now in the Ashmolean Museum, Oxford.

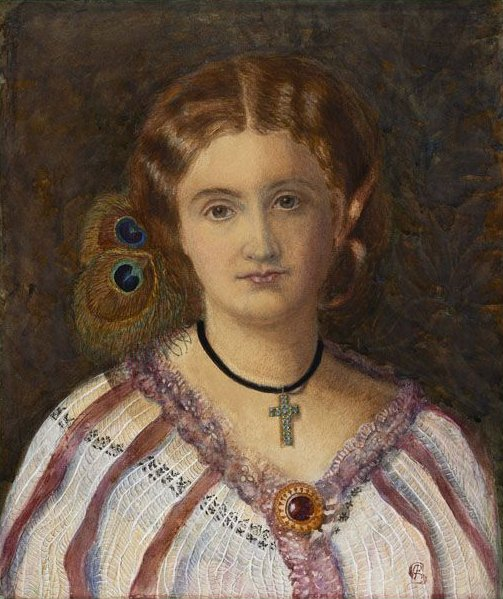
Portrait of Clare Stephens by F.G. Stephens, c. 1865, watercolor and gouache with scraping and selectively applied glaze on wove paper National Gallery of Canada

He communicated the aims of the Brotherhood to the public. He became the art critic and later the art editor of the Athenaeum from 1860–1901, while also writing freelance for other art-history periodicals including The Art Journal and The Portfolio. He also wrote for journals on the continent and the United States – notably, the pro-Pre-Raphaelite journal The Crayon, from 1856–1859. His contributions to the Brotherhood's magazine The Germ were made under the pseudonyms Laura Savage and John Seward. During this time he was heavily influenced by Dante Gabriel Rossetti, whom he allowed to write reviews of his own work under Stephens's name.

Stephen's first work of art history, Normandy: its Gothic Architecture and History was published in 1865, and Flemish Relics, a history of Netherlandish art, appeared in 1866. Monographs on William Mulready (1867) and on Edwin Landseer (1869) followed. In 1873 he started writing series of almost 100 articles on British collecting for the Athenaeum; these treated major collections and small collectors alike thus encouraging middle-class art patronage and the growing Victorian interest for contemporary art.

He was also Keeper of the Prints and Drawings in the British Museum and wrote most entries in the first volumes of the Catalogue of Prints and Drawings in the British Museum, Division I: Political and Personal Satires, from 1870 onward. In 1875, Stephens began to characterise himself as an art historian rather than a critic and in 1877 he started to write contributions for the Grosvenor Gallery catalogues, which he continued to do until 1890. When Rossetti died Stephens co-wrote his obituary for the Athenaeum published on 15 April 1882.

Stephens was a loyal supporter of his former tutor Holman Hunt over many years, but the two fell out over Hunt's painting The Triumph of the Innocents (1885), which Hunt had asked Stephens to box and transport for him, and which had been lost for some time in transit and damaged. Hunt became increasingly paranoid, and interpreted a money gift from Stephens for his newborn son to be a slight, sending it back. The friendship between the two was broken when Stephens reviewed The Triumph of the Innocents and criticised it for its mixing of hyper-realism and fantasy.

Almost twenty years later Hunt retaliated by launching a scathing attack on Stephens in the second edition of his Pre-Raphaelitism and the Pre-Raphaelite Brotherhood (1914). In 1894, Stephens published a Portfolio monograph on Rossetti. He contributed essays on art to Henry Duff Traill's Social England: a Record of the Progress of the People (1893–1897) placing Pre-Raphaelitism in a continuing tradition of British art. This contradicted the Brotherhood's view that they had flowered uniquely from a pallid past. In 1895 he published a book on Lawrence Alma-Tadema and his review of the posthumous exhibition of Millais in 1898 took the painter to task for poorly thought-out works.

Other artists about whom he wrote include Thomas Bewick, Edward Burne-Jones, George Cruikshank, Thomas Gainsborough, William Hogarth, Edwin Landseer, William Mulready, Samuel Palmer, Joshua Reynolds, Thomas Rowlandson, Sir Anthony van Dyck, and Thomas Woolner.

Stephens' conservative views on modern art and his strong dislike of Impressionism ended his forty-year association with the Athenaeum.

Stephens married the artist Rebecca Clara Dalton in 1866. From 1866–1905, the couple lived at 10 Hammersmith Terrace, Hammersmith, west London. Their son was the railway engineer Holman Fred Stephens (1868–1931). Stephens died at home on 9 March 1907 and is buried in Brompton Cemetery. Much of his collection of art and books was auctioned at Fosters in 1916, after his widow's death, but his son bequeathed several works of art to the Tate Gallery.

He is sometimes cited as the great exponent of writer's block: He started to write a political sonnet for the first number of The Germ magazine. On 13 October 1849 he had completed 11½ lines, which he showed to James Collinson, who said they were "the best of all." By 12 November it had "attained the length of 12 lines, with the reservation of a tremendous idea for the final two." The magazine appeared in January 1850 but the poem was never published.

== See also ==
- English school of painting
- Pre-Raphaelite Brotherhood
