= Ferdinand Lured by Ariel =

Painting by John Everet Millais

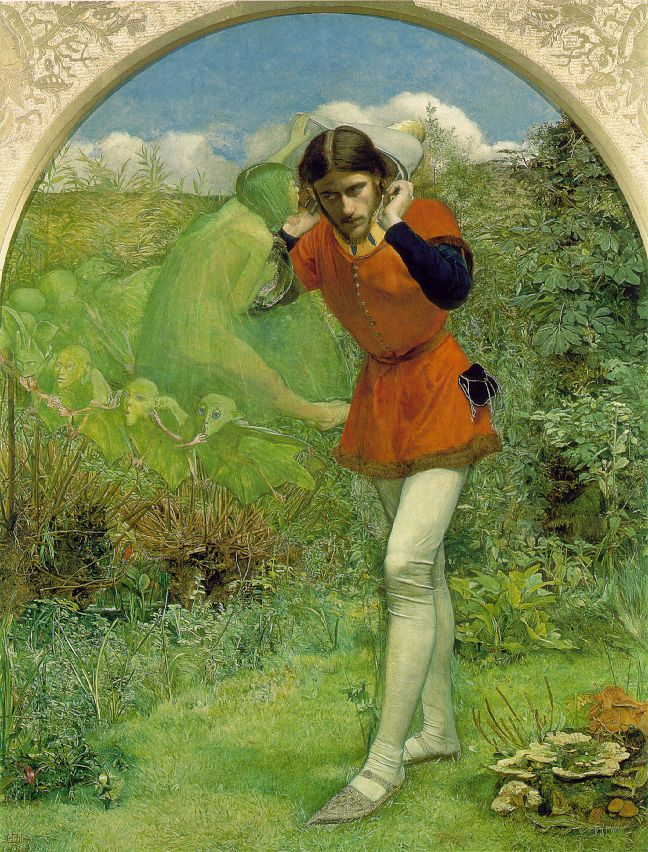
- Artist: John Everett Millais
- Year: 1849–50
- Medium: Oil on canvas
- Dimensions: 65 cm × 51 cm (25.5 in × 20 in); 64.8 cm diameter (50.8 in)
- Location: Private collection

Ferdinand Lured by Ariel is an 1849–50 painting by John Everett Millais which depicts an episode from Act I, Scene II of Shakespeare's c. 1611 play The Tempest. It illustrates Ferdinand's lines "Where should this music be? i' the air or the earth?". He is listening to Ariel singing the lyric "Full fathom five thy father lies". Ariel is tipping Ferdinand's hat from his head, while Ferdinand holds on to its string and strains to hear the song. Ferdinand looks straight at Ariel, but the latter is invisible to him.

The painting was Millais' first attempt at the plein air Pre-Raphaelite Brotherhood style, which he did at Shotover Park near Oxford. He wrote to his close friend and Pre-Raphaelite colleague Holman Hunt that he had painted a "ridiculously elaborate" landscape. Referring to Hunt's belief in devotion to detail he wrote that "you will find it very minute, yet not near enough for nature. To paint it as it ought to be would take me a month a weed — as it is, I have done every blade of grass and leaf distinct."

He painted the face of Ferdinand from another Pre-Raphaelite, Frederic George Stephens. The clothing and the pose are derived from plate 6 of Camille Bonnard's Costumes Historiques, which represents the costume of a "young Italian" of the fifteenth century.

The supernatural green bats were the last additions to the composition. Their grotesque poses put off the patron who had originally undertaken to buy it, since they were a radical departure from the standard sylph-like fairy figures of the day. They adopt the poses of "see, hear, speak no evil."

The invisibility of Ariel and the bats is suggested by their semi-merger with the green background. The connection with natural camouflage is implied by the presence of the green lizards hiding in front of the clump in the right foreground.

The work was exhibited at the Royal Academy in 1850.

The painting was bought by the collector Richard Ellison, and in 1897 entered the collection of Roger Makins, 1st Baron Sherfield, who acquired several Millais paintings. Later, the composer and impresario, Andrew, Lord Lloyd Webber, tried to buy it. In an interview with Apollo magazine, Lloyd Webber said: "I offered the price put on it [£9.5m], and was going to do it in association with the Ashmolean, but the owner turned the offer down". Subsequently, the work received a three-year temporary export licence to the Metropolitan Museum of Art.

A study for Ferdinand Lured by Ariel is held at Sudley House in Liverpool.

== Reception ==
Critical reception was initially mixed. The Atheneaum stated that it was "better in the painting" than Millais' controversial previous exhibit Christ in the House of His Parents, but "more senseless in the conception." The Art Journal identified "a considerable vein of eccentricity" in the portrayal of Ariel as "a hideous green gnome". The Times condemned it as a "deplorable example of perverted taste."

In 1998, when it seemed as though the painting might leave Britain to be sold in the U.S., the columnist Kevin Myers, wrote that he would "put my foot through it" with "violent joy".
