= Setebos =

Tehuelche god

Setebos (also Settaboth) was a deity of the Tehuelche people of eastern Patagonia. The name was recorded by Europeans traveling with Ferdinand Magellan during the first circumnavigation of the world (1519–1522), and again some 58 years later by Sir Francis Drake during his (1577–1579) circumnavigation voyage. The Tehuelche language is recently extinct; since the name Setebos is not attested in more recent ethnographic studies of eastern Patagonian indigenous peoples, the reports made during the 16th century appear to be the only documented evidence of a god having this name.

However, the name Setebos occurs twice in Shakespeare's 1611 play The Tempest, and scholars generally agree that Shakespeare adopted the name after having read a sixteenth-century English account of Magellan's voyage. In the play, Setebos, an unseen character, is described as the god worshiped by the sea-witch Sycorax, the mother of the subhuman Caliban. Many Shakespearean scholars have explicitly connected the character of Setebos in The Tempest with the characteristics attributed by the Tehuelche people to their god Setebos.

Largely because of Shakespeare's use of the name, "Setebos" has maintained currency in published works, including poems, novels and plays. In some of these (e.g. Robert Browning's Caliban upon Setebos) Setebos is understood to be the mythical character mentioned in The Tempest, while in others (e.g. Mónica Maffía's Cimbelino en la Patagonia) Setebos is presented both as a Shakespearean character and as the Tehuelche god.

Setebos's physical appearance is described only briefly in the 16th century accounts, and not at all in The Tempest, and in subsequent works, Setebos has been imagined in a variety of different ways, ranging from nearly human, to a tiger-toad chimera, to a bizarre extraterrestrial creature.

== Setebos in the New World ==
In 1519 the Portuguese sailor Ferdinand Magellan crossed the Atlantic on the first leg of his circumnavigation of the world. Near the southern tip of South America he encountered native people who were described by the Italian who accompanied the expedition, Antonio Pigafetta (1480–1534), as “Patagoni”. Pigafetta's manuscript account of the voyage is believed lost, but four other manuscripts from the same time period, one in Italian (known as the "Ambrosian" or "Milan" manuscript) and three in French translation, are extant. The most accurate and complete English translation of Pigafetta's report was published by James Alexander Robertson in 1906 based on the Ambrosian manuscript.

The first encounter between the Europeans and the Patagonians took place in May 1520, when the fleet had been anchored for two months at Puerto San Julian. According to Pigafetta, "One day we suddenly saw a naked man of giant stature on the shore of the port, dancing, singing, and throwing dust on his head." The natives were given gifts and some were invited on board the ships. Two weeks later, four natives appeared and Magellan's crew captured two of them by a ruse: loading their arms with presents and then shackling their legs. "When our men were driving home the cross bolt, the two giants began to suspect something, but the captain assuring them, however, they stood still. When they saw later that they were tricked, they raged like bulls, calling loudly for Setebos to aid them".

Pigafetta also reported on the burial customs of the natives:

When one of those people die, ten or twelve demons all painted appear to them and dance very joyfully about the corpse. They notice that one of those demons is much taller than the others, and he cries out and rejoices more. They paint themselves exactly in the same manner as the demon appears to them painted. They call the larger demon Setebos, and the others Cheleulle. That giant [native] also told us by signs that he had seen the demons with two horns on their heads, and long hair which hung to the feet belching forth fire from mouth and buttocks.

Pigafetta relates that another native, who was brought on board one of the ships, was shown a cross and was terrified. "Once I made the sign of the cross, and, showing it to him, kissed it. He immediately cried out “Setebos,” and made me a sign that if I made the sign of the cross again, Setebos would enter into my body and cause it to burst. When that giant was sick, he asked for the cross, and embracing it and kissing it many times, desired to become a Christian before his death".

The Patagonian's god is also mentioned (this time spelled "Settaboth" and also "Settaboh") in a separate account of Sir Francis Drake's voyage of circumnavigation (1577–1580), a half-century after Magellan's. Drake followed a similar route to Magellan's along South America's eastern coast, and laid anchor at Puerto Deseado (121 nautical miles north of Puerto San Julián) for two weeks in May–June 1578. Here the sailors made their first acquaintance with the Patagonians. An encounter is described in a journal kept by Francis Fletcher (c. 1555 – c. 1619), a priest of the Church of England who accompanied Drake on his voyage. According to Fletcher, the English attempted to trade some trinkets, but the natives were cautious and retreated. "They would have non of our company" wrote Fletcher, "till such tyme they were warranted by oracle from their god Settaboth, that is, the Divell, whom they name their great god". The natives then sent one of their own, a "priest or prophet", to confer with Settaboth:

[the prophet] departed for the tyme from them into som secret place under the side of the hill, where Settaboh appeared unto him to give him his oracle to bring unto them, that they might know what they should doe, that is, whether they should be acquainted with us or noe. Now when the prophet came to them againe he seemed to be changed in shape, for even as Settaboh appeared vnto him, he in shew and outward appearance came to them, haveing on his head before, standing upright, little hornes, and two long and broad black feathers ... but in a long tyme they would not receave annything out of our hands, except we cast it downe upon the ground.

The journals of Pigafetta (Magellan) and Fletcher (Drake) were not published immediately after voyage's end. Pigafetta returned to Europe in 1522, where he presented a number of kings and queens with extracts from his narrative of Magellan's voyage, and from the Seignory of Venice he obtained permission to publish it, but he never did. The first published version of Pigafetta's journal was an Italian translation of a French translation of the lost Italian original. That Italian translation was itself translated into English in abbreviated form by Richard Eden in his The Decades of the New Worlde, published in London in 1555, and then posthumously reprinted in an augmented version in 1577. It is the 1577 Eden version where Shakespeare is most likely to have come across the name Setebos.

Francis Fletcher's account of Drake's voyage of circumnavigation, which also discussed an encounter with the native Patagonians, was not published until 1628, after Shakespeare's death. However textual evidence suggests that Shakespeare may have been familiar with Fletcher's (yet unpublished) account, as discussed in the next section.

== Shakespeare and Setebos ==
In Shakespeare's The Tempest, which was first performed on 1 November 1611, the character Caliban twice mentions a god Setebos. The first instance occurs near the play's beginning. Caliban is responding to a threat from Prospero, who asks Caliban if he is refusing a command to fetch wood. In an aside to the audience, Caliban says (Act I, Scene II, Line 374):

No, 'pray thee. I must obey. His Art is of such pow'r,
It would controll my Dams god Setebos,
And make a vassaile of him.

Caliban's "Dam" (mother) is the evil witch Sycorax. The second instance is near the play's end. Ariel has lured Caliban and two co-conspirators, Antonio and Sebastian, to Prospero's cell, where spirits in the shape of dogs have been set to snarling at them. Caliban addresses Setebos (Act V, Scene I, Line 261):

O Setebos, these be brave spirits indeede!
How fine my Master is! I am afraid
He will chastise me.

There is no documented proof that Shakespeare was familiar with the accounts by Pigafetta or Fletcher of the New World, or that he knew about the Tehuelche god Setebos. However it is widely accepted, by literary scholars and historians, that Shakespeare was familiar with those accounts, and that he chose the name Setebos for the god of Caliban and Sycorax based on them.

One argument is based on the notoriety, in the 16th century, of Magellan's and Drake's voyages:

Whether or not Shakespeare read [Pigafetta's] or any other account of Magellan’s voyage, these were the sorts of terms, names, and incidents that were being bruited about. Magellan's voyage was discussed as polar or lunar expeditions have been in modern times. We need to read the voyage literature, therefore, not necessarily to find out what Shakespeare read, but to ascertain what Shakespeare and his audience together would have been likely to know—what they would have gathered from a variety of sources.

But probably more persuasive is the work by Shakespearean scholars Frank Kermode, Geoffrey Bullough, Hallett Smith and others who have traced textual connections between New World materials and The Tempest. For instance: In the French and Italian accounts of Magellan's voyage that preceded Eden's, two of the mutineers against Magellan were named Antonio and Sebastian, and Magellan was said to have put the mutiny down with the help of one Gonzalo Gomez de Espinosa. In the play, for comparison, two characters also named Antonio and Sebastian conspire to kill king Alonso, and an advisor named Gonzalo; Prospero and Ariel thwart the conspiracy.

In the case of Francis Fletcher's account of Drake's voyage, which was not published until after Shakespeare's death, some of the resemblances to happenings in The Tempest are striking, suggesting that Shakespeare was familiar with Fletcher's unpublished narrative. For example the description in the play of Alonso and his party coming upon the banquet prepared by the "several strange Shapes" parallels the description in Fletcher of the first meeting between Drake's men and the Patagonians. In the words of Hallett Smith: "Shakespeare's imagination, at the time he wrote The Tempest, would appear to have been stimulated by the accounts of travel and exploration in the new world".

Many Shakespeare scholars have explicitly connected Setebos of The Tempest with the Patagonian Setebos. For instance, John Lee writes:

In his comprehensive generalisation Shakespeare ascribes to Caliban some vague affinities with the most barbarous of all the American races. ... [Sir Francis] Drake echoes reports by earlier Spanish travellers of the savage worship, which the Patagonians offered their 'great devil Setebos.' Of this Patagonian deity Caliban twice makes mention, calling him 'my dam's god, Setebos' (I. ii. 373; V. i. 261). Despite his dissimilarity from the Patagonians in all other respects, he avows himself a votary of their 'great devil'.

And John Gillies writes "Caliban's description of Setebos as 'my dam's god' (1.2.376) is fully consistent with Pigafetta's account of Setebos as a devil, in view of Prospero's repeated references to Caliban as a devil":

The name 'Setebos' is more than just a random echo of the voyage narratives. By worshipping the god which Antonio Pigafetta describes as being worshipped by the Patagonian Indians of the storm-beaten wilderness of Tierra del Fuego, Sycorax is identified with the most remote, God-forsaken and degenerate of sixteenth-century Amerindian types. ... If Prospero is to be believed, Sycorax has had intercourse with 'the devil himself', resulting in Caliban, 'the son that she did litter here'.

== Post-Shakespearean representations of Setebos ==
=== In poetry ===
==== Caliban Upon Setebos ====
Robert Browning's poem, published in 1864, has as second title "Natural Theology in the Island". J. Cotter Morison gave what is now a standard interpretation of Browning's title: "the writer's intention ... is to describe in a dramatic monologue the Natural Theology,—that is, the conception of God,—likely, or rather certain to occur to such a being as Caliban." Caliban's god is, of course, Setebos, and the poem can be seen as an analysis of the thought processes of Caliban as he tries to understand the nature of his god. Browning uses Caliban (or so it is widely argued) to demonstrate the errors of constructing God in the image of ourselves, and perhaps also as a rhetorical vehicle to attack established religions, in particular, Calvinism.

Shakespeare's Caliban is a primitive version of a man, and Caliban conceives of his god as a primitive man might, based on his experience with the natural world. Much of the poem is concerned with Caliban's fantasy of himself as a god, and the analogies he draws between his own imagined behavior and that of Setebos. Caliban imagines, for instance, crabs walking from the mountains to the sea, and says he will

Let twenty pass, and stone the twenty-first,
Loving not, hating not, just choosing so.

He concludes "As it likes me each time, I do: so He" [i.e. Setebos]. Caliban reasons that Setebos is a being who derives vicarious satisfaction from creating creatures who (unlike Setebos) are capable of physical reproduction, and then expresses his jealously by committing capricious acts of spite and vengeance on those creatures. Setebos inspires fear and loathing in Caliban with few consolations: Caliban anticipates no afterlife nor is he optimistic about relief from suffering in this one. Although he imagines a second god above Setebos, which he calls "The Quiet", Caliban can't imagine either of these gods as working in his favor. Setebos, Caliban imagines, "Looks up, first, and perceives he cannot soar / To what is quiet and hath happy life; / Next looks down here, and out of very spite / Makes this a bauble-world to ape yon real".

Browning twice mentions, as a physical attribute of Setebos, his multiple hands:

'Careth but for Setebos
The many-handed as a cuttle-fish,

and

Also it pleaseth Setebos to work,
Use all His hands, and exercise much craft,
By no means for the love of what is worked.

although it is possible that Caliban is meant to be speaking metaphorically here.

=== In theater ===
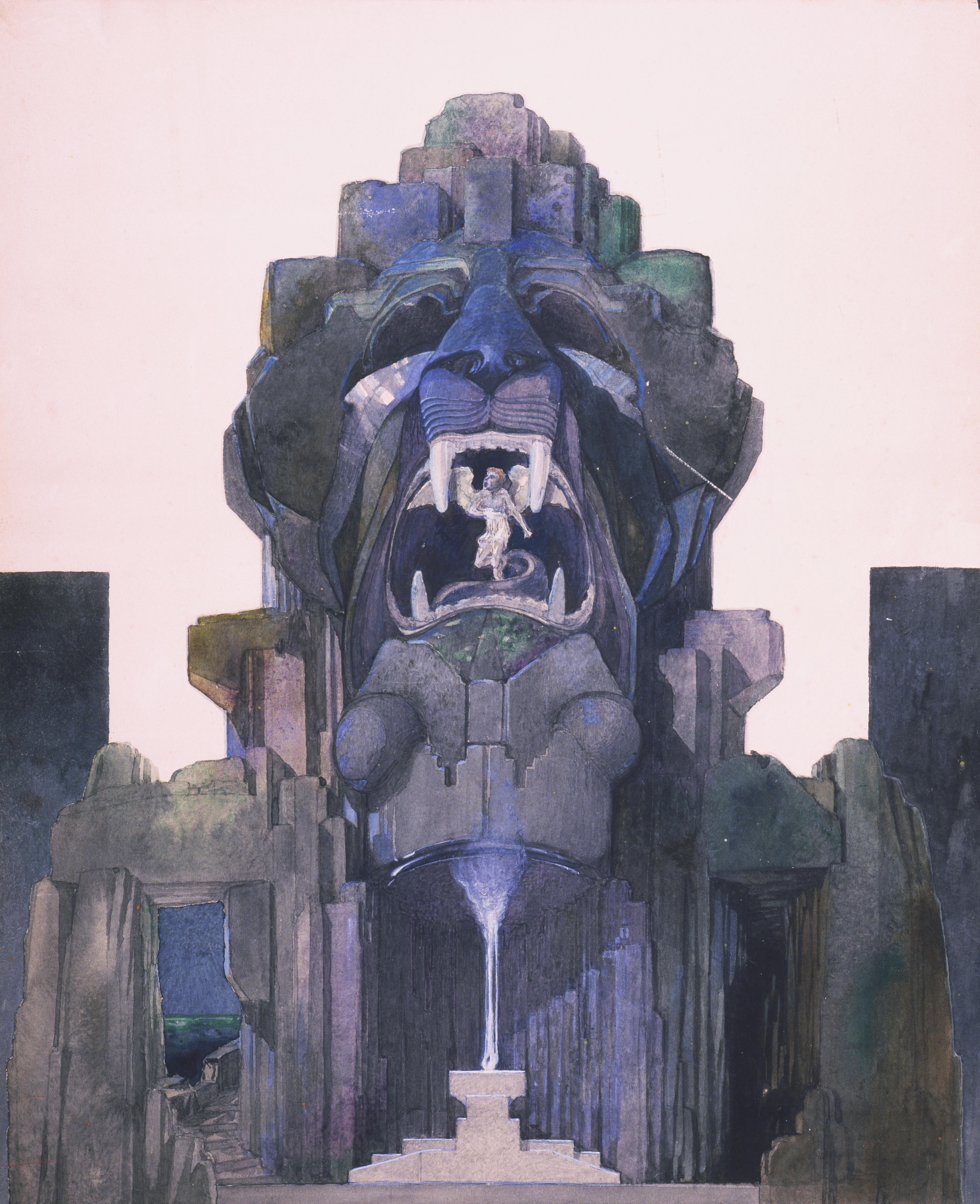
Figure 2. Joseph Urban's design for “The Cave of Setebos” showing Ariel imprisoned by Setebos.

==== Caliban by the Yellow Sands ====
To commemorate the 300th anniversary of Shakespeare's death in 1916, New York City commissioned Percy MacKaye to create a theatrical experience for the community based on Shakespeare's work. The result, Caliban by the Yellow Sands, required about 30 professional actors for the speaking roles and about 2500 mute participants for the pantomimes.

MacKaye described the opening scene:

The scene is the cave of SETEBOS, whose stark-colored idol — half tiger and half toad — colossal and primitive — rises at centre above a stone altar.

On the right, the cave leads inward to the abode of SYCORAX; on the left, it leads outward to the sea, a blue-green glimpse of which is vaguely visible.

High in the tiger-jaws of the idol, ARIEL — a slim, winged figure, half nude — is held fettered.

Miranda discovers the imprisoned Ariel; Prospero releases Ariel and his spirits, and together with Prospero they convert Setebos's cave into a theater and perform a pageant consisting of scenes from Shakespeare. The dramatic tension consists of a struggle for Caliban's soul, between the forces of darkness, represented by Setebos and his "priests" Lust, War and Death, and the forces of light, i.e. Prospero, Ariel and Miranda.

Judging from the program of the second (Boston) set of performances in 1917, as well as other contemporary accounts, the role of Setebos was not a speaking one and Setebos was not portrayed via an actor. Rather, the "middle stage" (where the characters of The Tempest interacted) was dominated by a two-headed idol, "half tiger, half toad," representing Setebos. The frontispiece of MacKaye's Program, shown here in Figure 2, displays an image of Setebos created by Joseph Urban for the New York performances; the caption is "The Cave of Setebos."

==== Cimbelino en la Patagonia ====
Mónica Maffía's play was written for a 2022 performance by her Buenos Aires based theater company, Setebos. It is described as "an eco-drama based on Shakespeare's Cymbeline, set within the Tehuelche myth of the god/hero Setebos." The play was commissioned in connection with the Cymbeline in the Anthropocene project, described as "an international research-in-performance project which brings together seven theatre companies and environmentally committed productions from four continents." The play was performed as part of the "Cymbeline in the Anthropocene" Festival.

In a 2022 interview with the CBC, Maffía said

there’s a connexion through Caliban, which is where this adaptation of Cymbeline comes from for me, because Caliban prays to his god, which is Setebos. Researching who Setebos was, I found that [out] in Pigafetta’s chronicles of Magellan and the first [circum]navigation; and through those chronicles we learn that when [the Spanish] met the Tehuelches, [the latter] were very tall. And that in their funeral rites, they said that Setebos appeared, and with smaller “devils.” So Setebos is both a hero and a god-devil figure.

In a separate interview in 2022, Maffía elaborated: Setebos, she said, was also

the father of people who were the ancestral people of Patagonia who were Tehuelche, and in their tradition, animals are people. We know about that god, not usually through a connection with our myths, but through Shakespeare ... None of those who were my group of actors knew even the name Setebos. They immediately got philosophical about it. They turned down their voices and their souls began to speak. So I thought that’s an opportunity for me as a director and as a playwright to get people to know about these folktales that were traditional before Shakespeare.

The action begins with actors arriving at a cabaña in El Chaltén, a small mountain village in Santa Cruz Province, Argentina that is supposedly the birthplace of the Tehuelche fire-god Setebos, creator of the region's people and wildlife. The actors gradually fall under the spell of the mountain. As the play progresses, each actor plays characters representing three states of being: contemporary Argentinian, Shakespearian, and Tehuelche human-animal. The lines between these states become blurred, until finally the characters metamorphose into avatars of the Setebos myth. Unlike in Shakespeare's play, the actors repeatedly invoke Setebos by name; for instance, the character Ínogen's touching “¡Setebos, me encomiendo a tu protección!” / “Setebos, I commend myself to your protection” before she goes to sleep. Near the end of the play, the story of the birth of Setebos and the Tehuelche people is presented by the spiritually reborn actors wearing animal masks.

=== In literature ===
==== Ilium/Olympos ====
An extraterrestrial creature called Setebos plays an important role in Dan Simmons' science-fiction novels Ilium and Olympos. The two novels, which comprise a series, also contain characters named Prospero, Ariel and Caliban who are clearly based on the eponymous characters in The Tempest, and there is little doubt that the author patterned his Setebos after the god mentioned in that play as well. Simmons's Setebos also calls to mind Browning's description in his Caliban upon Setebos in that Simmons describes Setebos as having myriad arms; however unlike Browning's Setebos, who is infertile, Simmons's character is highly fecund.

Simmons gives the following description of Setebos, as seen through the eyes of a human named Daeman. The creature sits over a crater at the center of a blue, ice-cold dome:

This raised crater looked very much like a nest and the impression was reinforced by the thing that filled it—gray brain tissue, convoluted ridges, multiple pairs of eyes, mouths, and orifices opening and shutting in no unison, a score of huge hands beneath it—these hands occasionally rearranging the huge form's mass on its nest, settling it more comfortably—and he saw other hands, each larger than the room Daeman occuped at Ardis Hall, that had emerged from the brain on stalks and were pulling themselves and their trailing tentacles across the glowing floor.

Daeman counts several dozen eggs around Setebos. He steals one; it eventually hatches, into a miniature, and very malevolent, version of its parent.
