= Caliban upon Setebos =

1864 poem by Robert Browning

"Caliban upon Setebos" is a poem written by the British poet Robert Browning and published in his 1864 Dramatis Personae collection. It deals with Caliban, a character from Shakespeare's The Tempest, and his reflections on Setebos, the brutal god believed in by himself and his late mother Sycorax.

Some scholars see Browning as being of the belief that God is in the eye of the beholder, and this is emphasized by a barbaric character believing in a barbaric god. An offshoot of this interpretation is the argument that Browning is applying evolutionary theory to religious development. Others feel that he was satirizing theologians of his time, who attempted to understand God as a reflection of themselves; this theory is supported by the epigraph, Psalm 50:21, "Thou thoughtest that I was altogether such a one as thyself." This could be taken as God mocking Caliban (and Browning's contemporaries) for their methods of attempting to understand Him. (Note: See note at the bottom of "Caliban upon Setebos | Representative Poetry Online". rpo.library.utoronto.ca.)

== Excerpt ==
The poem begins (text in [brackets]) with a brief narration, but quickly moves to Caliban's monologue, in which he contemplates his god:

['Will sprawl, now that the heat of day is best,
Flat on his belly in the pit's much mire,
With elbows wide, fists clenched to prop his chin.
...
And talks to his own self, howe'er he please,
Touching that other, whom his dam called God.]
...
Setebos, Setebos, and Setebos!
'Thinketh, He dwelleth i' the cold o' the moon.

'Thinketh He made it, with the sun to match,
But not the stars; the stars came otherwise;
Only made clouds, winds, meteors, such as that:
Also this isle, what lives and grows thereon,
And snaky sea which rounds and ends the same.

— Lines 1-3, 15-16, 24-30
