= Leader of the Chinese Communist Party =

Chinese unique ruling party top official

Leader of the Central Committee of the Chinese Communist Party
- Incumbent; Xi Jinping since 15 November 2012
- Simplified Chinese: 中共中央主要负责人
- Traditional Chinese: 中共中央主要負責人
- Literal meaning: CCP Central Committee primary responsible person
Transcriptions
Standard Mandarin
- Hanyu Pinyin: Zhōnggòng Zhōngyāng Zhǔyào Fùzérén

The leader of the Central Committee of the Chinese Communist Party is the highest-ranking official and head of the Chinese Communist Party (CCP). Since 1982, the general secretary of the Central Committee is considered the party's leader.

Since the party's formation in 1921, the leader's post has been titled as Secretary of the Central Bureau (1921–1922), Chairman (1922–1925, 1928–1931, and 1943–1982), and General Secretary (1925–1928, 1931–1943, and 1982 onwards).

By custom the party leader has either been elected by the CCP Central Committee or the Politburo. There were several name changes until Mao Zedong finally formalized the office of Chairman of the Central Committee in 1945. Since 1982, the CCP National Congress and its 1st CC Plenary Session has been the main institutional setting in which the CCP leadership are elected. From 1992 onwards, every party leader has been elected by a 1st CC Plenary Session. In the period 1928–45 the CCP leader was elected by conference, meetings of the Central Committee or by decisions of the Politburo. The last exception to this rule is Jiang Zemin, who was elected at the 4th Plenary Session of the 13th Central Committee in the aftermath of the 1989 Tiananmen Square protests and massacre. Currently, to be nominated for the office of general secretary, one has to be a member of the CCP Politburo Standing Committee, the top decision body.

Despite breaching the Constitution of the Chinese Communist Party, several individuals (who are not included in the list) have been de facto leaders of the CCP without holding formal positions of power. Wang Ming was briefly in charge in 1931 after Xiang Zhongfa was jailed by Kuomintang forces, while Li Lisan is considered to have been the real person in-charge for most of Xiang's tenure. Mao was reckoned as the CCP's de facto leader from the Long March onward before formally becoming Chairman in 1943.

Beginning in the 1980s, the CCP leadership desired to prevent a single leader from rising above the party, as Chairman Mao had done. Accordingly, the post of CCP Chairman was abolished in 1982. Most of its functions were transferred to the revived post of General Secretary. Deng Xiaoping is the last and only CCP official to become de facto leader of the CCP and paramount leader of China despite having never served as chairman or general secretary. His highest post was Chairman of the Central Military Commission (commander-in-chief).

== Leader offices ==
Title	Existence	Established	Officeholder(s)
Secretary of the Central Bureau	1921–1922	1st National Congress	Chen Duxiu (1921–27); Qu Qiubai (de facto 1927–28)
Chairman of the Central Executive Committee	1922–1925	2nd National Congress	Chen Duxiu (1921–27); Qu Qiubai (de facto 1927–28)
General Secretary of the Central Committee	1925–1928	4th National Congress	Chen Duxiu (1921–27); Qu Qiubai (de facto 1927–28)
Chairman of the Politburo & Poliburo Standing Committee (continued to be referred to as the General Secretary in practice)	1928–1931	6th National Congress	Xiang Zhongfa (1928–30); Qu Qiubai (de facto 1930–31)
General Secretary of the Central Committee	1931–1943	6th Central Committee (5th Plenary Session)	Wang Ming (acting 1931); Bo Gu (acting 1931–34, formal 1934–35); Zhang Wentian (1935–45)
Chairman of the Central Politburo	1943–1945	Politburo resolution	Mao Zedong
Chairman of the Central Committee	1945–1982	7th National Congress	Mao Zedong (1945–76); Hua Guofeng (1976–81); Hu Yaobang (1981–82)
General Secretary of the Central Committee	1982–present	12th National Congress	Hu Yaobang (1982–87); Zhao Ziyang (1987–89); Jiang Zemin (1989–2002); Hu Jintao (2002–12); Xi Jinping (2012–present)

== Leaders ==
Leader			Term				Key offices held while leader (top party post in bold)
No.	Portrait	Name (birth–death)	Start	End	Tenure	Central Committee	Key offices held while leader (top party post in bold)
1		Chen Duxiu 陈独秀 (1879–1942)	23 July 1921	7 August 1927 (Note: Resigned July 1927, formally removed from office 7 August 1927.)	6 years and 15 days	1st (1921–22); 2nd (1922–23); 3rd (1923–25); 4th (1925–27); 5th (1927–28)	**Secretary of the Central Bureau** (1921–22); **Chairman of the Central Executive Committee** (1922–25); **General Secretary of the Central Committee** (1925–27)
		**de facto** Qu Qiubai 瞿秋白 (1899–1935)	7 August 1927	19 July 1928	347 days	5th (1927–28)	(Convening) **Member of the Provisional Politburo Standing Committee**
2		Xiang Zhongfa 向忠发 (1879–1931)	1 July 1928	24 June 1931 (Note: Date executed by the Nationalist force.)	2 years and 358 days	6th (1928–45)	**Chairman, Central Politburo**; **Chairman of the Central Politburo Standing Committee** Leader in name only, formal authorities exercised by others at various times.
		**Acting**; Wang Ming 王明 (1904–1974)	24 June 1931	15 September 1931	83 days	6th (1928–45)	(Convening) **Member of the Politburo Standing Committee**; **Head of the Chinese delegation to the Communist International** De facto leader as early as January 1931
3		Bo Gu 博古 (1907–1946)	September 1931 (Note: Acting until 15 January 1934.)	17 January 1935	3 years, 4 months	6th (1928–45)	Acting as the leading **Member of the Politburo Standing Committee** (1931–34); **General Secretary of the Central Committee** (1934–35)
4		Zhang Wentian 张闻天 (1900–1976)	17 January 1935	20 March 1943	8 years and 62 days	6th (1928–45)	**General Secretary of the Central Committee** As of September 1938 (6th Plenary) all political authority shifted to Mao and Zhang remained Leader in name only. In March 1943 the office of Chairman of the Central Politburo formally replaced General Secretary as the office of the party leader.
5		Mao Zedong 毛泽东 (1893–1976)	20 March 1943	9 September 1976	33 years and 173 days	6th (1928–45); 7th (1945–56); 8th (1956–69); 9th (1969–73); 10th (1973–77)	**Chairman, Central Politburo**; **Chairman, Central Committee**; Chairman, Central Military Commission; President, Central Party School; Chairman, People's Republic of China; Chairman, CPPCC National Committee; Chairman, Central People's Revolutionary Military Commission; Honorary Chairman, CPPCC National Committee; President and Chairman, National Defence Council
6		Hua Guofeng 华国锋 (1921–2008)	7 October 1976	28 June 1981	4 years and 264 days	11th (1977–82)	**Chairman, Central Committee**; Premier, State Council; Chairman, Central Military Commission; President, Central Party School
7		Hu Yaobang 胡耀邦 (1915–1989)	29 June 1981	15 January 1987	5 years and 200 days	11th (1977–82); 12th (1982–87)	**Chairman, Central Committee** (1981–82); **Secretary General, Central Secretariat** (1982–87)
8		Zhao Ziyang 赵紫阳 (1919–2005)	15 January 1987	24 June 1989	2 years and 159 days	12th (1982–87); 13th (1987–92)	**General Secretary of the Central Committee**; Chairman, Central Leading Group for Financial and Economic Affairs; Vice Chairman, Central Military Commission
9		Jiang Zemin 江泽民 (1926–2022)	24 June 1989	15 November 2002	13 years and 144 days	13th (1987–92); 14th (1992–97); 15th (1997–2002)	**General Secretary of the Central Committee**; Chairman, Central Military Commission; President of the People's Republic of China; Leader, Central Leading Group for Taiwan Affairs; Leader, Central Leading Group for Financial and Economic Affairs; Leader, Central Foreign Affairs Leading
10		Hu Jintao 胡锦涛 (born 1942)	15 November 2002	15 November 2012	10 years	16th (2002–07); 17th (2007–12)	**General Secretary of the Central Committee**; President of the People's Republic of China; Chairman, Central Military Commission; Leader, Central Leading Group for Taiwan Affairs; Leader, Central Leading Group for Financial and Economic Affairs; Leader, Central Foreign Affairs Leading Group
11		Xi Jinping 习近平 (born 1953)	15 November 2012	Incumbent	13 years and 315 days	18th (2012–17); 19th (2017–22); 20th (2022–27)	**General Secretary of the Central Committee**; Chairman, Central Military Commission; President of the People's Republic of China; Leader, Central Leading Group for Taiwan Affairs; Director, Central Comprehensively Deepening Reforms Commission; Director, Central Financial and Economic Affairs Commission; Chairman, National Security Commission; Director, Central Cyberspace Affairs Commission|Leader, Central Leading Group for Military Reform

== See also ==
- Party and state leaders
- Leadership core
- Orders of precedence in China
- List of leaders of the People's Republic of China
