= 4th National Congress of the Chinese Communist Party =

1925 Chinese Communist Party conference

4th National Congress of the Chinese Communist Party 中国共产党第四次全国代表大会
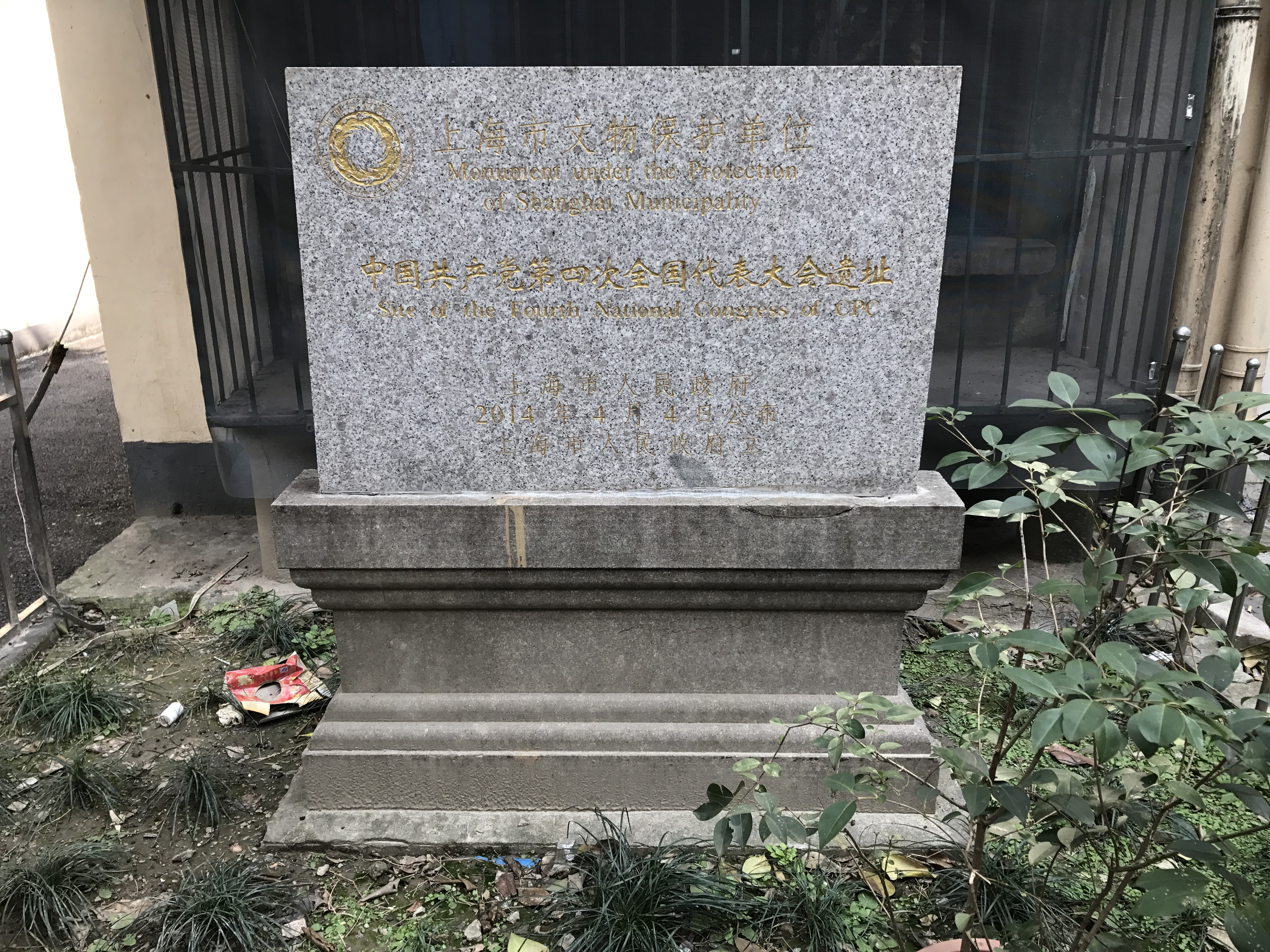
- Memorial at the original site of the congress
- Begins: January 11, 1925
- Ends: January 22, 1925
- Locations: No. 8, Lane 256, Dongbaoxing Road, Shanghai International Settlement.
- Previous event: 3rd National Congress of the Chinese Communist Party (1923)
- Next event: 5th National Congress of the Chinese Communist Party (1927)
- Participants: 20 representatives
- Major events: Election held to form the 4th Central Executive Committee of the Chinese Communist Party
- Leader: Chen Duxiu (Leader of the Chinese Communist Party)

The 4th National Congress of the Chinese Communist Party was held in the Shanghai International Settlement at a shikumen residence in No. 8, Lane 256, Dongbaoxing Road, between 11 and 22 January 1925. The congress was attended by 20 participants representing 994 party members of the Chinese Communist Party (CCP). The congress succeeded the 3rd National Congress of the Chinese Communist Party and preceded the 5th National Congress of the Chinese Communist Party. A congress report was drafted by Chen Duxiu who represented the 3rd Central Executive Committee of the Chinese Communist Party.

== Background ==
Upon the formation of the First United Front between the Chinese Communist Party (CCP) in 1924, labour and peasant movements intensified throughout China, generating fears of revolution. Amidst rising tensions, the congress aimed to:

- reflect the experiences gathered under the CCP–KMT cooperation throughout 1924;
- strengthen the leadership of revolutionary movements, and to;
- respond several new issues faced by the party.

== Agenda ==
4th National Congress of the Chinese Communist Party
- Traditional Chinese: 中國共產黨第四次全國代表大會
- Simplified Chinese: 中国共产党第四次全国代表大会
Transcriptions
Standard Mandarin
- Hanyu Pinyin: Zhōngguó Gòngchǎndǎng Dìsìcì Quánguó Dàibiǎo Dàhuì

Abbreviated name
- Chinese: 四大
Transcriptions
Standard Mandarin
- Hanyu Pinyin: Sì dà

Congress was attended by several important figures within the Comintern and the CCP. This included Chen Duxiu, Cai Hesen, Qu Qiubai, Tan Pingshan, Zhou Enlai, Peng Shuzhi, Zhang Tailei, Chen Tanqiu, Li Weihan, Li Lisan, Wang Hebo, Xiang Ying, and Grigori Voitinsky.

12 resolutions were passed in congress. 14 members were elected during the process for the newly formed 4th Central Committee of the Chinese Communist Party. After congress, the first meeting of the 4th Central Committee was held, electing 5 party members, namely Chen Duxiu (as the general secretary), Peng Shuzhi, Zhang Guotao, Cai Hesen and Qu Qiubai to form the party's Central Bureau (a precursor to the Politburo).

Congress simultaneously made revisions to the party constitution. During the 2nd National Congress of the Chinese Communist Party, it was decided that party organizations of the lowest-tier were to be referred as "committees" composed of 3 to 5 party members. By the 3rd Congress, it was changed to "small groups" of 5 to 10 party members. However, revisions of the 4th Congress renamed them " to "branches", while dictating that a "branch" could be formed with the participation of 3 or more party members.

== Aftermath and legacy ==
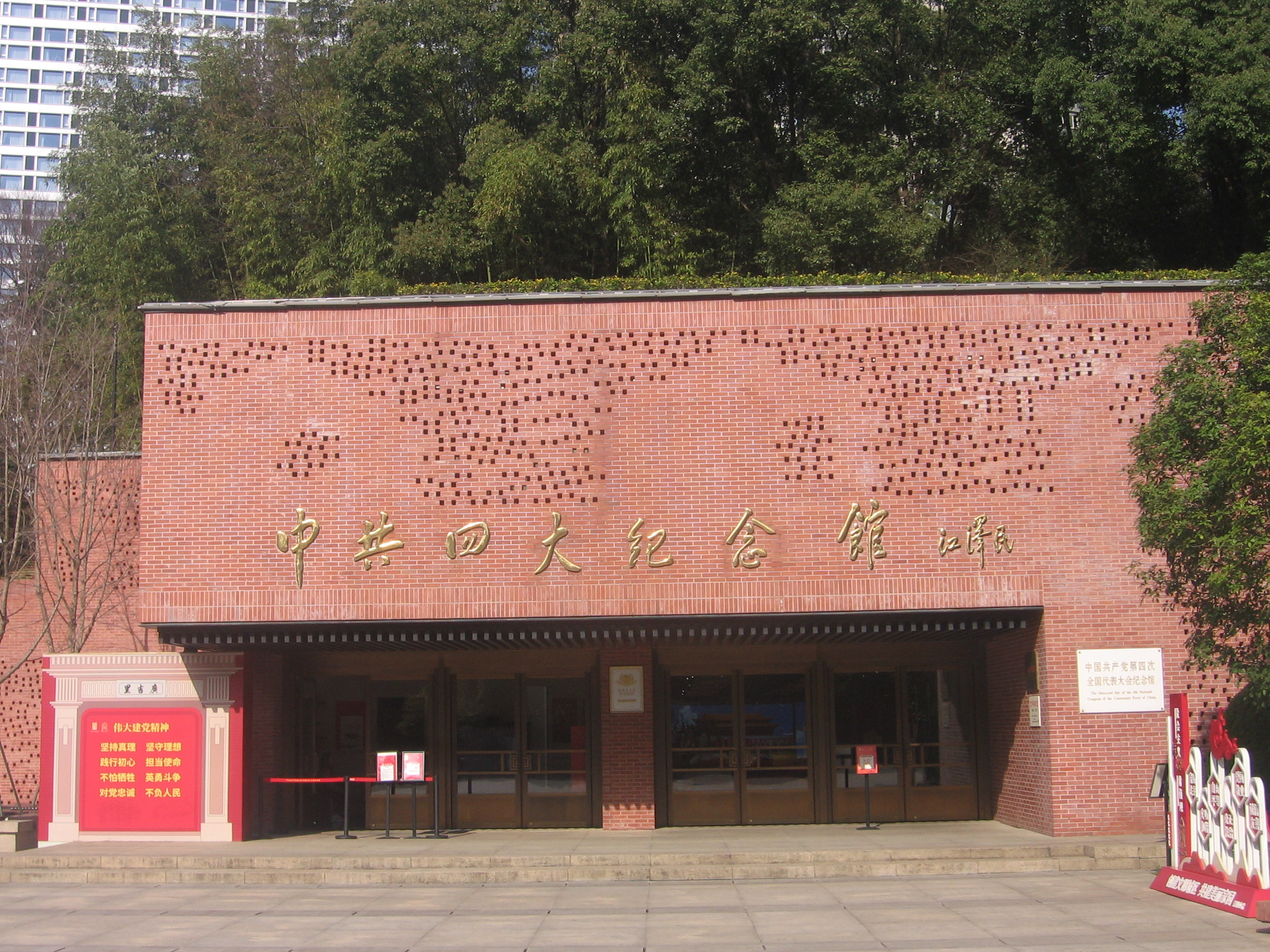
The Memorial Hall of the 4th National Congress of the Chinese Communist Party

The original shikumen residence in Shanghai that hosted the congress was destroyed during the Second Sino-Japanese War. The site has since been converted into several apartments constructed during the 1980s. In 1995, the Shanghai Municipality created a memorial at the site to commemorate the 70th anniversary of the 4th congress.
