= 3rd National Congress of the Chinese Communist Party =

1923 Chinese Communist Party conference

3rd National Congress of the Chinese Communist Party 中国共产党第三次全国代表大会
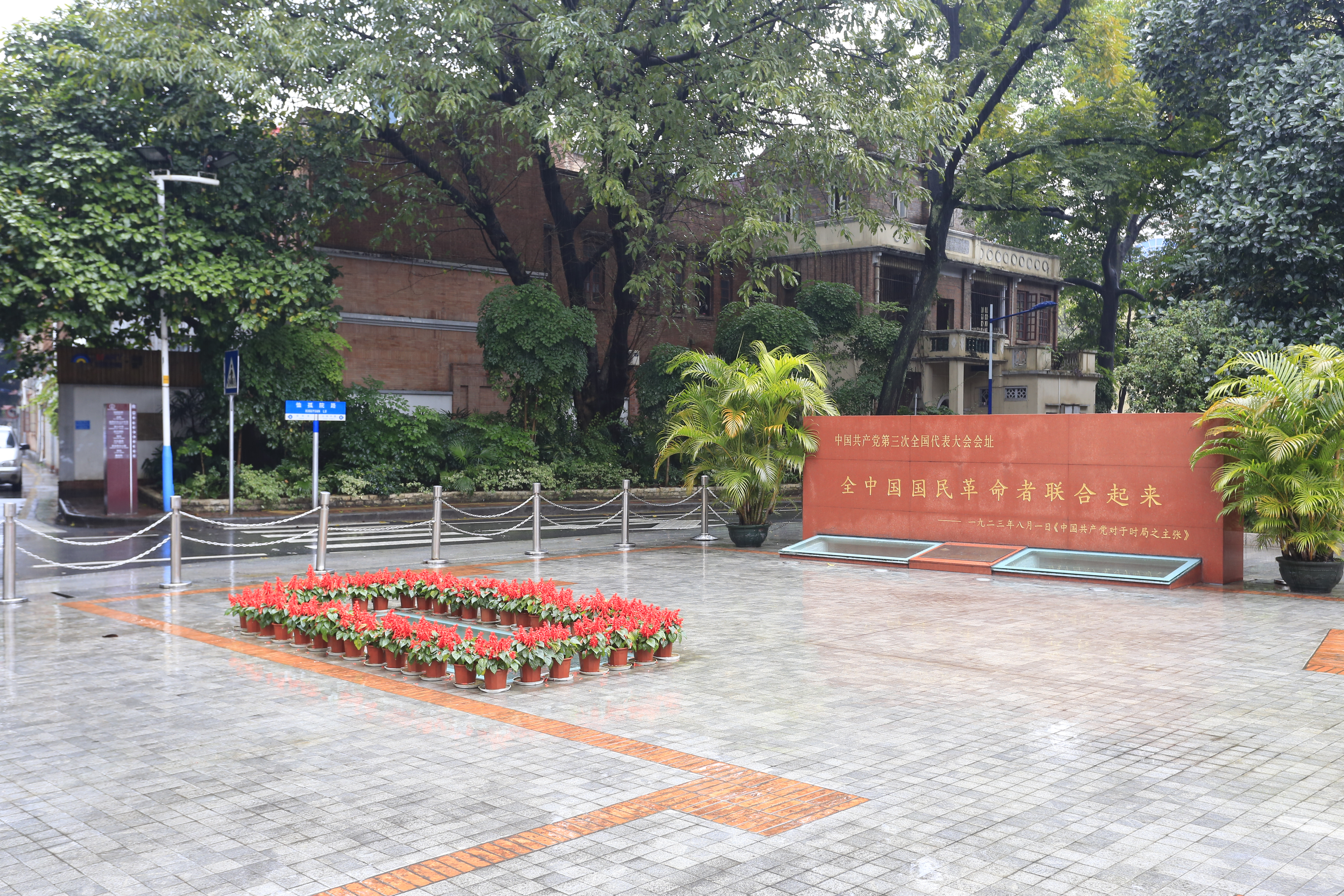
- Present site of 31 Xuguyuan Road, where the 3rd Congress took place.
- Begins: 12 June 1923
- Ends: 20 June 1923
- Locations: 31 Xuguyuan Road, Dongshan, Guangzhou City, Guangdong Province, Republic of China.
- Previous event: 2nd National Congress of the Chinese Communist Party (1922)
- Next event: 4th National Congress of the Chinese Communist Party (1925)
- Participants: 40 representatives
- Major events: Election held to form the 3rd Central Executive Committee of the Chinese Communist Party
- Leader: Chen Duxiu (Leader of the Chinese Communist Party)

3rd National Congress of the Chinese Communist Party
- Traditional Chinese: 中國共產黨第三次全國代表大會
- Simplified Chinese: 中国共产党第三次全国代表大会
Transcriptions
Standard Mandarin
- Hanyu Pinyin: Zhōngguó Gòngchǎndǎng Dìsāncì Quánguó Dàibiǎo Dàhuì

Abbreviated name
- Chinese: 三大
Transcriptions
Standard Mandarin
- Hanyu Pinyin: Sān dà

The 3rd National Congress of the Chinese Communist Party was held in Guangzhou at 31 Xuguyuan Road between 12 June and 20 June 1923. It succeeded the 2nd National Congress of the Chinese Communist Party and preceded the 4th National Congress of the Chinese Communist Party. The congress was attended by 40 representatives across China and Moscow representing 420 party members of the Chinese Communist Party (CCP).

The congress was hosted by Chen Duxiu, with participation from Li Dazhao, Zhang Guotao, Tan Pingshan, Cai Hesen, Chen Tanqiu, Luo Zhanglong, and Henk Sneevliet (representing the Comintern). Sneevilet briefed congress regarding the inquiries by the Comintern related to the cooperation between the CCP and Kuomintang. The congress held elections to appoint members in the 3rd Central Executive Committee of the Chinese Communist Party and drafted resolutions of the 3rd Congress.

== The Congress ==
In early June 1923, Mao Zedong, along with Zhu Shaolian, represented the party division at Zhengxiang and left Shanghai for Guangzhou to attend the event. There were three main agendas discussed and implemented in the congress:

1. Drafting of the party manifesto;
2. Cooperation with the Kuomintang towards reunification, and;
3. An election to form the 3rd Central Executive Committee of the Chinese Communist Party.

The main agenda involved relates to the cooperation between the CCP and the Kuomintang, to discuss issues on the reunification of the Republic. This matter was highlighted by a report from Chen Duxiu. Mao Zedong made a speech in the congress about workers' movements at Hunan. Congress passed the National Movement and Kuomintang Question Act, allowing CCP members to join the Kuomintang, while maintaining efforts to expand the CCP itself. Congress also elected 9 members and 5 backup-members of the 3rd Central Executive Committee of the CCP.

The Central Committee elected Chen, Mao, Luo Zhanglong, Cai Hesen, and Tan Pingshan to form the Central Committee of the CCP. Chen was nominated as the President, while Mao was elected as Secretary. Congress also passed the Chinese Communist Party Central Committee Organisation Act, ruling that "the Secretary is responsible for all documentations, paperwork, communications, and meeting records of the political party. All party documents must be signed by the President and the Secretary of the CCP." Congress was dismissed when representatives sang The Internationale at the Martyr's Tomb of the Huanghuagang Park. After congress ended, Mao, Chen, Li and Xiang Jingyu remained at Guangzhou.

The Resolution about the Women's Movement, drafted by Xiang Jingyu, was passed at the Congress. The Resolution emphasized the importance of women workers' movements and stated that shared anti-warlord and anti-imperialist themes could unite the various women's movements in China such as the feminist movement, the women's suffrage movement, and the movement to abolish prostitution. The Internationale was played at the closing ceremony of the National Congress. Since the Congress, it became standard for The Internationale to be played in the closing ceremonies of each National Congress held by the CCP.

== Impact ==
Congress, in accordance to instructions sent from Comintern, officially confirmed that CCP members are allowed to join Kuomintang, solidifying the cooperation between the CCP and KMT.

After congress, under the promotion by the CCP, Sun Yat-sen reformed the Kuomintang, validating the policies discussed within the Congress, leading to the formation of the 1st National Congress of the Kuomintang in 1924, where CCP-Kuomintang cooperation was formally established.
