= National Congress of the Chinese Communist Party =

Party conference held every five years

National Congress of the Chinese Communist Party 中国共产党全国代表大会
- Emblem of the Chinese Communist Party

Type
- Type: Party meeting
- Term limits: Five years

Leadership
- Authority: Constitution of the Chinese Communist Party
- Jurisdiction: Chinese Communist Party

Meeting place
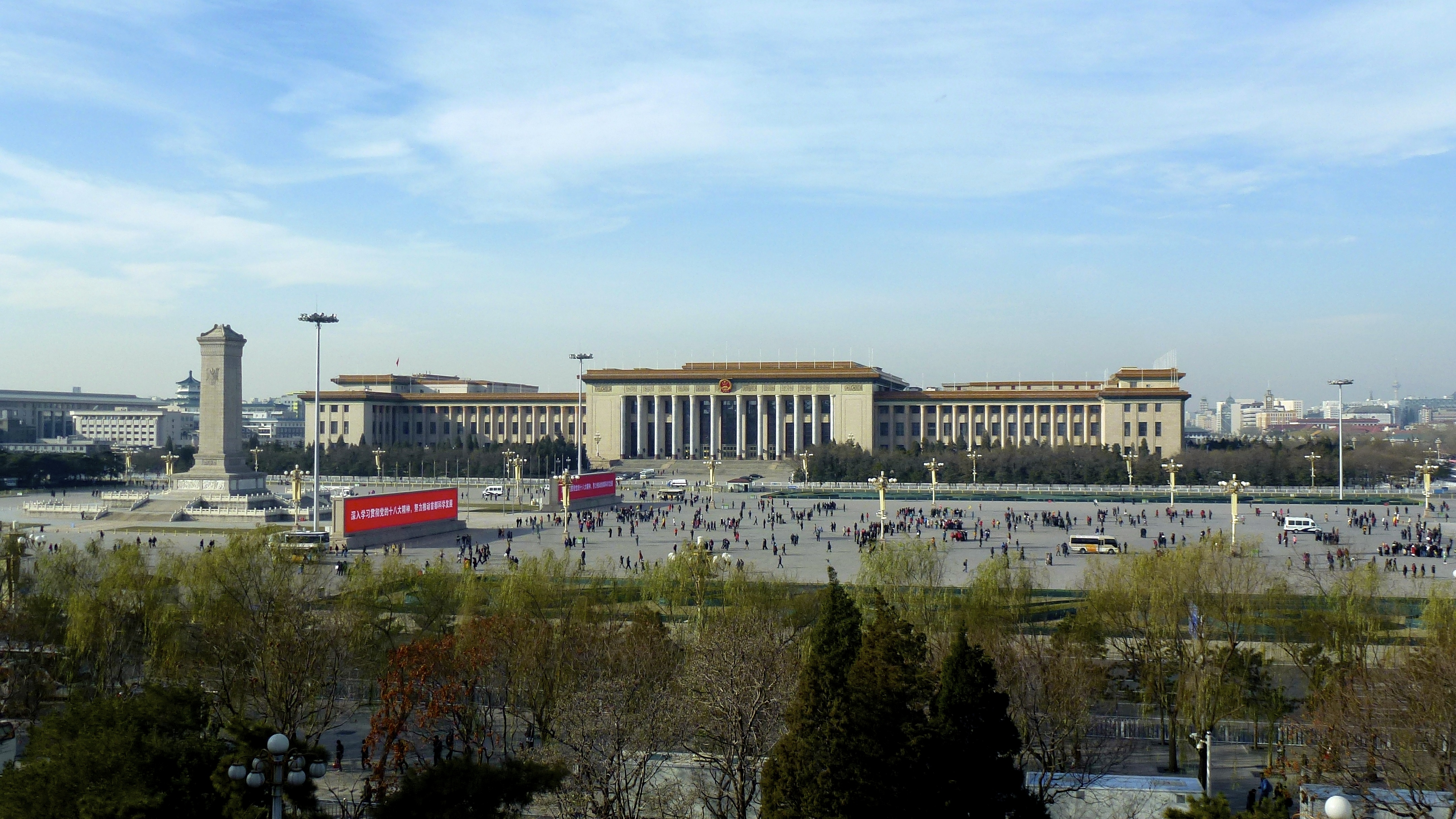
- Great Hall of the People; Beijing, China

National Congress of the Chinese Communist Party
- Simplified Chinese: 中国共产党全国代表大会
- Traditional Chinese: 中國共產黨全國代表大會
- Literal meaning: National Representative Assembly of the Chinese Communist Party
Transcriptions
Standard Mandarin
- Hanyu Pinyin: Zhōngguó Gòngchǎndǎng Quánguó Dàibiǎo Dàhuì

Commonly abbreviated as
- Simplified Chinese: 中共党代会
- Traditional Chinese: 中共黨代會
Transcriptions
Standard Mandarin
- Hanyu Pinyin: Zhōnggòng Dǎngdàihuì

The National Congress of the Chinese Communist Party (Chinese: 中国共产党全国代表大会; pinyin: Zhōngguó Gòngchǎndǎng Quánguó Dàibiǎo Dàhuì) is a party congress that is held every five years. The National Congress is formally the supreme body within the Chinese Communist Party (CCP).

Since 1987 the National Congress has been held in the months of October or November. The venue for the event, beginning in 1956, is the Great Hall of the People in Beijing. The Congress is the public venue for top-level leadership changes in the CCP and the formal event for changes to its constitution. In the past two decades the National Congress of the CCP has been pivotal at least as a symbolic part of leadership changes.

The Congress formally approves the membership of the Central Committee. Each five-year cycle of the National People's Congress also has a series of plenums of the Central Committee which since the mid-1990s have been held more or less regularly once every year.

== History ==
From the mid-1980s to the late-2010s, the CCP has attempted to maintain a smooth and orderly succession and avoiding a cult of personality, by having a major shift in personnel every ten years in even number party congresses, and by promoting people in preparation for this shift in odd number party congresses. In addition, as people at the top level of the party retire, there is room for younger members of the party to move up one level. Hence the party congress is a time of a general personnel reshuffle, and the climax of negotiations that involve not only the top leadership but practically all significant political positions in China. Because of the pyramid structure of the party and the existence of mandatory retirement ages, cadres who are not promoted at a party congress are likely to face the end of their political careers.

== Preparation ==
Similar to the practice of the NPC, the delegates to the Congress are formally selected from grassroots party organizations, and like the NPC, there is a system of staggered elections in which one level of the party votes for the delegates to the next higher level. For the National Congress, delegates are elected by the CCP's provincial level party congresses or their equivalent units in a selection process that is screened and supervised by the party's Organization Department as directed by the Politburo Standing Committee (PSC).

The party rules state that just before the National Congress, a preparatory committee must be established by the Politburo, with the current general secretary of the CCP generally chairing the committee. This committee oversees the election of the few thousand delegates to the National Congress and prepares a list of candidates to be elected to the Central Committee and its bodies, including the Politburo, PSC, Secretariat and the Central Military Commission. It additionally establishes a drafting committee that drafts the work report of the CCP general secretary, and also establishes a group that proposes amendments to the CCP constitution.

On the day before the first session of the National Congress, the incumbent General Secretary presides over a preparatory meeting of the congress's delegates. At this meeting he formally proposes the candidates for the Presidium of the National Congress (Chinese: 党代会主席团) and a Congress Secretary-General for approval as a single list. After undergoing the formality of election, the Presidium subsequently convenes on the same day and elects a Standing Committee to manage the procedural affairs of the National Congress during its sessions.

The Standing Committee of the Presidium of the National Congress (Chinese: 党代会主席团常委会) has been said to be the "leading core" of the Party Congress. It discusses and seeks consent on important issues related to the candidates and accordingly proposes solutions to the Presidium, chairs the plenary meetings of the Presidium and the electoral proceedings, reviews the rehearsal voting outcomes and submits a list of official candidates to the Presidium for discussion and approval. One of the major roles of the Presidium Standing Committee is to submit to the Party Congress Presidium a list of people who would chair the first plenary meeting of the newly elected Central Committee, thereby ensuring leadership continuity during the formal procedure that is used to elect the Politburo, the PSC and the General Secretary.

In recent elections, the members of the Standing Committee have included all members of the Politburo and the Secretariat. The size of the committee is not fixed and, in contingency situations, can also include other actors from the party and the state. Since 2002, all living and non-expelled former PSC members have also been members of the committee. This means that the Standing Committee of the National Congress Presidium essentially encompasses the de facto selectorate for the new Politburo and Standing Committee. According to Ling Li, who teaches Chinese studies in the University of Vienna, this system allows for peaceful transitions of power by allowing former and current party leaders to influence outcomes.

== The meeting ==
The National Congress gathers every five years in the Great Hall of the People in Beijing. At the opening of the meeting, the General Secretary delivers the political report of the incumbent Central Committee. According to the Center for Strategic Translation, the political report "recapitulates the victories and setbacks the Party experienced over the previous five years, announces changes in the Party’s ideological line, and establishes the goals intended to guide all party and state activity in the years to come". The political report is the most authoritative document in China's political system, and its drafting often lasts a year. It is drafted by a drafting group, which is often led by the person on track to be the next General Secretary. During the drafting process, hundreds of cadres provide feedback on the sections of the political report relevant to their responsibilities.

The Congress formally approves the membership of the Central Committee, a body composed of the top decision-makers in the party, state, and society. It also approves the membership of the Central Commission for Discipline Inspection and approves changes to the Party Constitution. Since the 3rd National Congress in 1923, The Internationale has been played at the closing ceremony of the National Congress.

== Keys ==
Abbreviations
CC	Central Committee
CCDI	Central Commission for Discipline Inspection
FM	Full member (a member with voting rights).
AM	Alternate member (a member without voting rights).
VD	Voting delegate (a delegate who can vote).
AD	Alternate delegate (a delegate who cannot vote).
DU	Data unavailable.
SID	Specially invited delegate (a party member who has retired, but given ordinary delegate rights).
Political Report	Political Report to the Central Committee, a document which briefs delegates about the period since the last congress and future work.
Constitution	Constitution of the Chinese Communist Party, the fundamental governing document of the CCP. Formerly known as the Charter.

== Convocations ==
Congress	Duration (start—end)	Delegates	Electoral units	Elected		Political Report (presented by)	Constitution (changes)
Congress	Duration (start—end)	Delegates	Electoral units	CC	CCDI	Political Report (presented by)	Constitution (changes)
1st National Congress; 8 days None	23–31 July 1921	12	7	—	—	Chen Duxiu	— (Note: The 1st National Congress conceived of a party program, a document which focuses on ideology rather than explaining the organizational structure of the party.)
2nd National Congress; 7 days CC consultations	16–23 July 1922	12	DU	5 FM – 3 AM	—	Chen Duxiu	1st Charter
3rd National Congress; 8 days CC appointments	12–20 June 1923	~30	DU	9 FM – 5 AM	—	Chen Duxiu	Amendment
4th National Congress; 11 days CC appointments	11–22 January 1925	20	DU	9 FM – 5 AM	—	Chen Duxiu	Amendment
5th National Congress; 13 days 1927 election	27 April–9 May 1927	~80	11	22 FM – 14 AM	—	Chen Duxiu	Amendment (Note: Decided by congress that the 5th Politburo would amend the constitution after the congress.)
6th National Congress; 23 days 1928 election	18 June–11 July 1928	84 VD – 34 AD	17	14 FM – 13 AM	—	Qu Qiubai	2nd Charter
7th National Congress; 49 days 1945 election	23 April–11 June 1945	544 VD – 208 AD	8	44 FM – 33 AM	—	Mao Zedong	3rd Constitution
8th National Congress; 30 days 1956 election	15–27 September 1956 – 5–23 May 1958	1,026 VD – 86 AD	31	97 FM – 73 AM	—	Liu Shaoqi	4th Constitution
9th National Congress; 23 days 1969 election	1–24 April 1969	1,512	DU	170 FM – 109 AM	—	Lin Biao	5th Constitution
10th National Congress; 4 days 1973 election	24–28 August 1973	1,249	DU	194 FM – 124 AM	—	Zhou Enlai	6th Constitution
11th National Congress; 6 days 1977 election	12–18 August 1977	1,510	DU	201 FM – 132 AM	—	Hua Guofeng	Amendment
12th National Congress; 6 days 1982 election	1–11 September 1982	1,600 VD – 149 AD	DU	210 FM – 138 AM	132	Hu Yaobang	7th Constitution
13th National Congress; 8 days 1987 election	25 October–1 November 1987	1,936 VD – 61 SID	33	175 FM – 110 AM	69	Zhao Ziyang	Amendment
14th National Congress; 6 days 1992 election	12–18 October 1992	1,989 VD – 46 SID	34	189 FM – 130 AM	108	Jiang Zemin	Amendment
15th National Congress; 7 days 1997 election	12 September – 18 September 1997	2,074 VD – 60 SID	36	193 FM – 151 AM	115	Jiang Zemin	Amendment
16th National Congress; 7 days 2002 election	8–14 November 2002	2,114 VD – 40 SID	38	198 FM – 158 AM	121	Jiang Zemin	Amendment
17th National Congress; 7 days 2007 election	15–21 October 2007	2,217 VD – 57 SID	38	204 FM – 167 AM	127	Hu Jintao	Amendment
18th National Congress; 7 days 2012 election	8–14 November 2012	2,270 VD – 57 SID	40	205 FM – 171 AM	130	Hu Jintao	Amendment
19th National Congress; 7 days 2017 election	18–24 October 2017	2,280 VD – 57 SID	40	204 FM – 172 AM	133	Xi Jinping	Amendment
20th National Congress; 7 days 2022 election	16–22 October 2022	2,296 VD – 83 SID	40	205 FM – 171 AM	133	Xi Jinping	Amendment
