= 5th Central Committee of the Chinese Communist Party =

Chinese political group (1927–28)

The 5th Central Committee of the Chinese Communist Party was in session from 1927 to 1928. It was set into motion by the 5th National Congress. It was followed by the 6th Central Committee of the Chinese Communist Party.

Beginning with this session, the CCP Central Executive Committee was renamed to the CCP Central Committee.

It had 33 members and 14 alternate members. It was preceded by the 4th Central Executive Committee of the Chinese Communist Party.

Its first plenary session elected the 5th Politburo of the Chinese Communist Party in 1927.

== Composition ==
=== Members ===
Members of the 5th Central Committee of the Chinese Communist Party
Name		4th CEC	6th CC	Birth	PM	Death	Birthplace	Gender	Ref.
Cai Hesen	蔡和森	Old	Elected	1895	1921	1931	Shanghai	Male	
Chen Duxiu	陳獨秀	Old	Not	1879	1921	1942	Anhui	Male	
Chen Qiaonian	陈乔年	New	Not	1902	1922	1928	Anhui	Male	
Chen Yannian	陈延年	New	Not	1898	1921	1927	Anhui	Male	
Deng Zhongxia	邓中夏	New	Alternate	1894	1921	1933	Hunan	Male	
Gu Shunzhang	顾顺章	New	Elected	1903	1925	1934	Jiangsu	Male	
He Chang	贺昌	New	Not	1906	1923	1935	Shanxi	Male	
Li Disheng	陈延年	New	Elected	1887	1922	1930	Hunan	Male	
Li Lisan	李立三	New	Elected	1899	1921	1967	Hunan	Male	
Li Weihan	李维汉	Old	Not	1896	1921	1984	Hunan	Male	
Liu Shaoqi	刘少奇	New	Not	1898	1921	1969	Henan	Male	
Luo Dengxian	罗登贤	By-elected	Elected	1905	1925	1933	Guangdong	Male	
Luo Yinong	罗亦农	New	Not	1902	1921	1928	Hunan	Male	
Luo Zhanglong	罗章龙	Member	Alternate	1896	1921	1995	Hunan	Male	
Luo Zhu	罗珠	New	Not	1902	1924	1970	Guangdong	Male	
Peng Gongda	彭公达	By-elected	Not	1903	1921	1928	Hunan	Male	
Peng Pai	杨殷	New	Elected	1896	1921	1929	Guangdong	Male	
Peng Shuzhi	彭述之	Old	Not	1896	1924	1983	Hunan	Male	
Qu Qiubai	瞿秋白	Old	Elected	1899	1921	1935	Fujian	Male	
Ren Bishi	任弼时	New	Elected	1904	1922	1950	Hunan	Male	
Su Zhaozheng	苏兆征	New	Elected	1885	1925	1929	Guangdong	Male	
Tan Pingshan	谭平山	Old	Not	1886	1921	1956	Guangdong	Male	
Xia Xi	夏曦	New	Not	1901	1921	1936	Hunan	Male	
Xiang Ying	项英	Old	Elected	1895	1921	1941	Anhui	Male	
Xiang Zhongfa	向忠发	New	Elected	1879	1921	1931	Shanghai	Male	
Yang Qishan	杨其珊	New	Not	1871	1925	1933	Guangdong	Male	
Yang Zhihua	杨之华	New	Not	1901	1924	1973	Zhejiang	Female	
Yi Lirong	易礼容	New	Not	1898	1921	1997	Hunan	Male	
Yun Daiying	恽代英	New	Not	1895	1921	1931	Hubei	Male	
Zhang Guotao	张国焘	Old	Elected	1897	1921	1979	Sichuan	Male	
Zhang Tailei	张太雷	Alternate	Not	1898	1921	1927	Jiangsu	Male	
Zhao Shiyan	赵世炎	New	Not	1901	1921	1927	Sichuan	Male	
Zhou Enlai	周恩来	New	Elected	1898	1921	1976	Jiangsu	Male	

=== Alternates ===
Alternates of the 5th Central Committee of the Chinese Communist Party
Name		4th CEC	6th CC	Birth	PM	Death	Birthplace	Gender	Ref.
Chen Tanqiu	陳潭秋	New	Alternate	1896	1921	1943	Hubei	Male	
Guo Liang	郭亮	New	Not	1901	1921	1928	Hunan	Male	
Huang Ping	黄平	New	Alternate	1901	1924	1981	Hubei	Male	
Li Zhenying	李震瀛	New	Not	1896	1921	1937	Hebei	Male	
Lin Yunan	林育南	New	Not	1898	1922	1931	Hubei	Male	
Liu Bozhuang	刘伯庄	New	Not	1895	1923	1947	Sichuan	Male	
Lu Shen	陆沉	New	Not	1900	1921	1940	Hubei	Male	
Mao Kewen	毛科文	New	Not	1898	1925	1929	Hunan	Male	
Mao Zedong	毛泽东	Return	Member	1893	1921	1976	Hunan	Male	
Wang Yazhang	王亚璋	New	Not	1902	1925	1990	Zhejiang	Female	
Wu Yuming	吴雨铭	New	Not	1898	1921	1959	Hunan	Male	
Xue Liu	薛六	New	Not	1903	1925	1930	Hubei	Male	
Yuan Dashi	袁达时	New	Not	1901	1921	?	Hunan	Male	
Zhuang Wengong	庄文恭	New	Not	1901	1921	1965	Hunan	Male	

== Bibliography ==
- Shen, Xueming; Zheng, Jianying (2001). 中共第一届至十五届中央委员 [Member of the 1st to 15th Central Committee of the Chinese Communist Party] (in Chinese). Central Literature Publishing House. ISBN 9787507310344.
