= 2nd Central Executive Committee of the Chinese Communist Party =

1922–1923 Chinese Communist Party gathering

The 2nd Central Executive Committee, officially the 2nd Central Executive Committee of the Communist Party of China (CPC, Traditional Chinese: 中共第二中央執行委員會), was elected by the 2nd National Congress and its electoral term started in 1922 and ended in 1923. This was the first form of a central committee organ elected by the CCP. Still, modern sessions of the Central Committee of the Chinese Communist Party are, by custom, numbered according to the session of the National Congress at which they are elected.

Because of the CCP's small size at the 1st National Congress, a Central Bureau was elected rather than a Central Committee. The name "Central Executive Committee" was used until the convocation of the 5th National Congress of the Chinese Communist Party in 1927, at which time it was shortened to Central Committee.

== Composition ==
=== Members ===
Members of the 2nd Central Executive Committee of the Chinese Communist Party
Name		1st CEB	3rd CEC	Birth	PM	Death	Portrait	Ref.
Cai Hesen	蔡和森	New	Elected	1895	1921	1931		
Chen Duxiu	陳獨秀	Old	Elected	1879	1921	1942		
Gao Junyu	高君宇	New	Not	1896	1921	1925		
Li Dazhao	李大釗	New	Elected	1889	1921	1927		
Zhang Guotao	张国焘	Old	Not	1897	1921	1979		

=== Alternates ===
Alternates of the 2nd Central Executive Committee of the Chinese Communist Party
Name		3rd CEC	Birth	PM	Death	Gender	Portrait	Ref.
Deng Zhongxia	邓中夏	Alternate	1894	1921	1933	Male		
Li Da	李达	Not	1890	1921	1966	Male		
Xiang Jingyu	向警予	Not	1895	1921	1928	Female		
Zhang Tailei	张太雷	Not	1898	1921	1927	Male		
