= Pavel Mif =

Soviet politician (1901–1939)

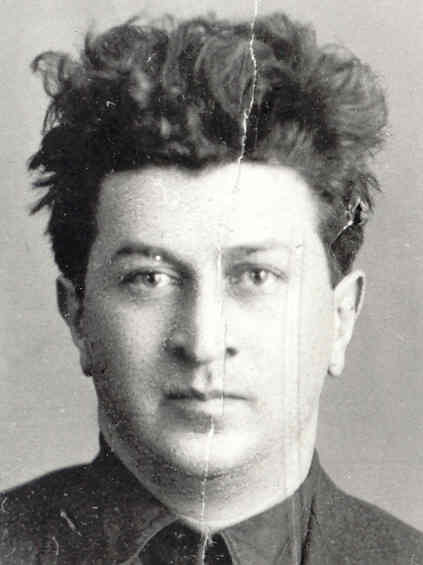
- Born: Mikhail Alexandrovich Fortus; 3 August 1901
- Died: 10 September 1939 (aged 38)
- Cause of death: Death by Execution
- Occupations: Comintern Agent and Adviser
- Organization: Comintern
- Political party: Communist Party of the Soviet Union
- Other political affiliations: Chinese Communist Party
- Criminal charges: "Membership in a counter-revolutionary terrorist organisation"
- Criminal penalty: Death
- Criminal status: Rehabilitated

Mikhail Alexandrovich Fortus (3 August 1901 – 10 September 1939), known under the pseudonym Pavel Mif, was an academic and specialist in Asian political policy to the government of the Soviet Union under Josef Stalin.

He was born in the Kherson area to a family of Jewish descent. He joined the Bolshevik party in May 1917 and served as a political commissar in the Russian civil war (1918–20). He studied history at Sverdlov Communist University from 1920 to 1921 and worked for the communist party in Ukraine from 1923 until 1925, when he became provost of Moscow Sun Yat-sen University under Karl Radek, and was promoted to its rector in 1927.

Pavel Mif was a member of the Executive Council of Comintern and its representative for China, in which capacity he attended the 5th and 6th National Congress of the Chinese Communist Party in 1927 and 1928 respectively, as well as the 4th Central Executive Committee of the Chinese Communist Party in 1931. He obtained a doctor's degree in economics in 1935.

Mif was arrested by the NKVD in December 1937, during Stalin's Great Purge, and sentenced to death in July 1938 for "membership of a counter-revolutionary terrorist organization". He was executed on 10 September 1939.

He was posthumously rehabilitated in 1956, following premier Nikita Khrushchev's denunciation of Stalin's purges at the 20th Congress of the Communist Party of the Soviet Union.
