= Cai Chang =

Chinese politician (1900–1990)

Chairperson of the All-China Women's Federation
- In office 1949–1978
- Preceded by: Position established
- Succeeded by: Kang Keqing

Personal details
- Born: 14 May 1900 Xiangxiang County, Changsha Prefecture, Hunan, Qing China (present-day Shuangfeng County, Hunan, China)
- Died: 11 September 1990 (aged 90) Beijing, China
- Party: Chinese Communist Party
- Spouse: Li Fuchun (m. 1923–1975)
- Children: Li Tete
- Relatives: Cai Hesen (brother); Xiang Jingyu (sister-in-law)
- Known for: First leader of the All-China Women's Federation

Chinese name
- Traditional Chinese: 蔡暢
- Simplified Chinese: 蔡畅
- Hanyu Pinyin: Cài Chàng
- Wade–Giles: Tsʻai^{4} Chʻang^{4}

Cai Chang (Chinese: 蔡畅; pinyin: Cài Chàng; EFEO: Ts'ai Tch'ang; 14 May 1900 – 11 September 1990) was a Chinese politician and women's rights activist who was the first chair of the All-China Women's Federation, a Chinese women's rights organization. She was among the leading women of the Chinese communist movement, and in 1937 the American writer Nym Wales called her the "Dean of Communist women". She was the first woman to become a member of the Central Committee of the Chinese Communist Party, and she chaired the All-China Women's Federation from 1949 to 1977.

== Early life ==
Cai Chang was born in 1900 in Xiangxiang County, Hunan (present-day Shuangfeng County, Hunan), to a lower middle class family in Qing China. Her mother, Ge Jianhao, came from a formerly wealthy family of scholars connected by marriage to Zeng Guofan, and was determined that all her children, daughters as well as sons, should be educated. Her father, Cai Rongfeng (1862–1932), was unsuccessful in business, working first in his family's chili sauce business and then at the Jiangnan Arsenal in Shanghai, before failing again as a farmer in the countryside. Her mother left her husband and paid for her children's schooling by selling her belongings. Cai was the youngest of six children, all of whom were very close to their mother, and two of whom died young. Her eldest sister, Cai Qingxi, born in 1884, returned to the family home soon after her own marriage. Two of her brothers, Cai Hesen (1895–1931) and Cai Luxian (1889–1925), later died as communist martyrs.

Known in childhood as Maomeizi, she took the name Cai Xianxi when she entered the Xiangxiang County First Girls' School at the age of thirteen. In 1915, she went to Changsha to escape a marriage arranged by her father, with her mother's support, and adopted the name Cai Chang. There she studied music and physical education at the Zhounan Girls' Normal School, graduating in 1916, and then taught physical education at a primary school for two or three years. Her mother often spoke admiringly of the late Qing revolutionary Qiu Jin, who had married into a Xiangxiang family.

Cai believed strongly in women's education and rejected marriage. She, her brother and Mao Zedong swore that they would never marry, a vow that none of them kept. Accounts differ on when she joined the New People's Study Society, which Cai Hesen and Mao founded in 1918. The historian Helen Rappaport writes that she became one of its first women members in the winter of 1917–1918. According to the Biographical Dictionary of Chinese Women, however, she was considered too young to join at the time and could only listen to the society's meetings at her family home, while her friend Xiang Jingyu, five years her senior, became one of its first women members. Cai later said that she did not become politically aware until she was a student in France.

== France and the Soviet Union ==
On 25 December 1919, Cai sailed from Shanghai to France with her mother, a brother and Xiang Jingyu, as part of a work-study programme arranged through the Sino-French Education Association. The women were placed at a girls' school in Montargis, south-east of Paris, where Cai took part in student protests that led to the deportation of more than a hundred Chinese students, including her brother. She sometimes worked in a factory during the day and studied at night. She studied anarchism, Marxism and Leninism alongside other Chinese socialist feminists. Her four years in France were in effect the period of her political awakening. There she met the Vietnamese revolutionary Ho Chi Minh and joined the New People's Study Society in 1920, the Chinese Socialist Youth League in 1922 and the French branch of the Chinese Communist Party (CCP) in 1923. The same year, she married Li Fuchun, a prominent communist, although Rappaport gives the year of the marriage as 1922.

Cai with her husband Li Fuchun (1925)

At the end of 1924, Cai and Li Fuchun left for the Soviet Union, and in February 1925 they enrolled at the Communist University of the Toilers of the East in Moscow.

== Revolutionary career ==
=== Women's work and the Northern Expedition ===
Cai returned to China with her husband in August 1925 and began decades of work on women's issues and on behalf of women workers. In Guangzhou, she became secretary of the Women's Committee of the CCP's Guangdong–Guangxi Area Committee and worked with He Xiangning in the Central Women's Department of the Kuomintang (KMT), which she had joined. For the following year, she was active in the women's liberation movement and in labour organising. Her Western dress and smoking, habits acquired in France, distanced her from the women factory workers she was trying to organise, and she changed her clothing as a result.

When the Northern Expedition began in 1926, Cai went to Nanchang, where she headed both the CCP's Jiangxi Women's Department and the propaganda section of the KMT's General Political Department. In 1927, she joined the Central Women's Committee and led it in Xiang Jingyu's absence. After the collapse of the alliance between the KMT and the CCP in mid-1927, she formally resigned from the KMT. From 1927 to 1931, she carried out women's work and underground party work in Wuhan, Wuchang, Shanghai and Hong Kong. The only interruption was a visit to Moscow in June and July 1928 to attend the CCP's Sixth National Congress and the Sixth Congress of the Communist International.

=== Jiangxi Soviet and the Long March ===
At the end of 1931, Cai was transferred to the Jiangxi Soviet, where she lectured on social history at the Red Army School in Ruijin. Earlier, she had helped to create the Marriage Decree of 1930, which declared that "free choice must be the basic principle of every marriage", and to write the Provisional Constitution of 1931. In February 1932, she became head of the Women's Department of the Jiangxi Provincial Central Committee and acting head of its Organisation Department. The marriage regulations that emerged from the First National Soviet Congress in 1931 had set out the principles of free choice in marriage and of monogamy. Under her leadership, the Women's Department encouraged women to become more self-reliant, to raise production and to take part in the military struggle to establish revolutionary bases.

In January 1934, shortly before the Long March, Cai and her husband were both elected to the Central Executive Committee of the Chinese Soviet Republic. During the Long March of 1934–1935, she was responsible for propaganda and for organising work among civilians, while her husband served as a political officer with the First Front Red Army. Her fellow marchers remembered her for singing "La Marseillaise" to raise morale and for staying cheerful despite constant hunger and fatigue.

=== Yan'an and the Civil War ===
Cai (bottom row, far right) with Zhou Enlai (top row, far left) and other members of the Chinese Comintern delegation in Moscow, USSR (1940)

The security that the communists gained in the northwest after the Long March allowed Cai and her husband, who like Mao were natives of Hunan, to strengthen their positions among the party's leaders. When the American journalist Edgar Snow met her in late 1936, Cai was responsible for winning the support of the local population in the Shaanxi–Gansu–Ningxia Border Region. She spent most of the period from 1936 to 1945 in Yan'an and the northwest, apart from about eighteen months in Moscow, from the autumn of 1938 to March 1940, when she studied at the Comintern school and received medical treatment. She became head of the Women's Committee of the CCP Central Committee in 1937 and served as its secretary from 1941 to 1953. In 1940, she was elected to the executive committee of the Shaanxi–Gansu–Ningxia Women's Federation. Her work, which combined organisation and propaganda, aimed to bring women into the party's general programmes and to establish childcare during the war, including through the National Refugee Children's Association.

Cai with Xu Yixin (left) and Chen Geng (1945)

During the Yan'an Rectification Movement in 1944, Cai criticised what she called the "feminist" position of some women and argued that men and women had to work together for the revolution to succeed. Her reply to Ding Ling's criticism of continuing patriarchal attitudes in Yan'an showed her firm support for Mao's party line. In 1945, Cai and her husband were elected full members of the CCP Central Committee, and she was the only woman to hold full membership, while Deng Yingchao and Chen Shaomin were elected as alternate members.

In 1945, Cai was elected head of the preparatory committee of the Women's Federation of China's Liberated Areas. The same year, she was elected in absentia to the executive committee of the Women's International Democratic Federation in Paris, and she became its vice-chair in 1948. She travelled abroad on its behalf, visiting Prague and Paris in 1947 and Budapest and the Soviet Union in 1948. After the end of the Second Sino-Japanese War and the outbreak of the Chinese Civil War, she was sent to Manchuria in December 1946, after her husband had been assigned to the Northeast Military Region, to begin women's work in areas newly taken by the communists. For the next two or three years, she was based in Harbin and travelled widely in the northeast, giving talks, attending conferences and looking into how women lived and worked in factories and villages.

== People's Republic of China ==
Cai with her grandson (1949)

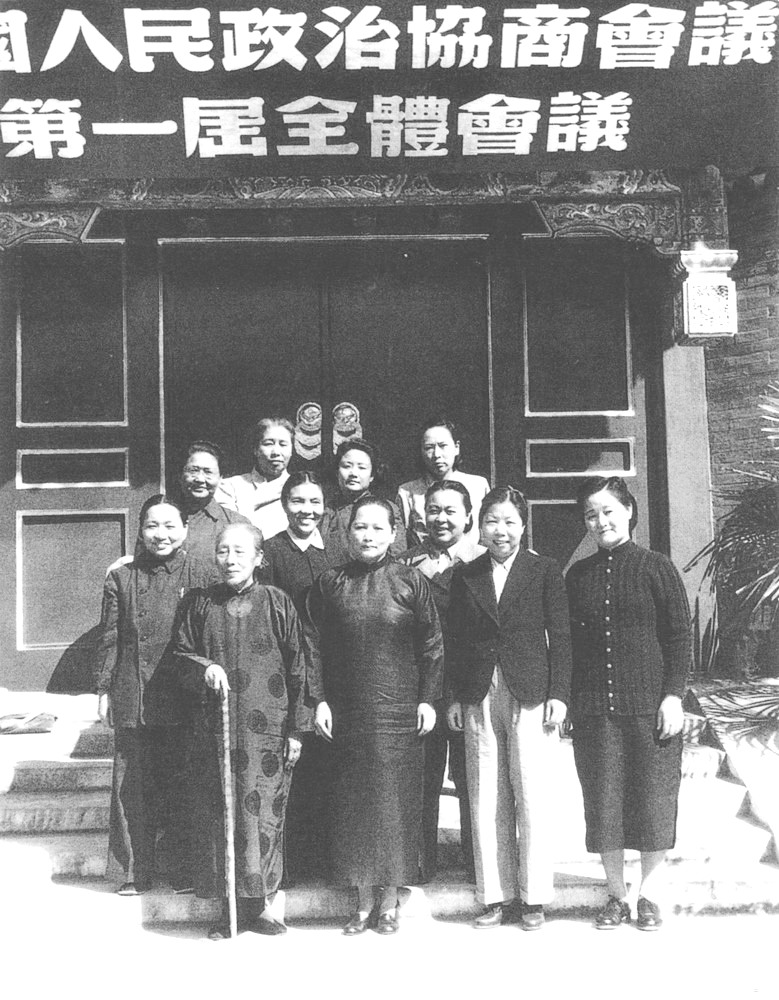
Cai (in the middle row, second from left) with other female members of the 1st National Committee of the Chinese People's Political Consultative Conference (1949)

After the founding of the People's Republic of China in 1949, Cai held many senior posts. She was a member of the CCP Central Committee from 1945 to 1977, a member of the presidium of the first Chinese People's Political Consultative Conference in 1949 and the only woman among the CCP's representatives on the Central People's Government Council. She chaired the All-China Women's Federation from 1949 to 1977 and was its honorary chair from 1978 to 1988. She also headed the Women Workers' Department of the All-China Federation of Trade Unions from 1948 to 1957 and was a member of the Standing Committee of the National People's Congress from 1954 to 1980. Part of her work in the federation included developing a strategy for privileged women to take a leading role in scientific and cultural improvements. Throughout the 1950s, she kept up a heavy schedule, speaking at International Women's Day events, chairing and attending meetings on women and work, publishing articles and statements and receiving foreign visitors. She largely stopped travelling abroad, but in 1953 she attended Joseph Stalin's funeral in Moscow and stayed there for a period to recover her health.

According to the Biographical Dictionary of Chinese Women, despite her high profile in the 1950s, Cai had little real role in governing China, and some regarded her as largely a symbolic figure for the country's women. From 1961, she largely withdrew from public life, possibly because of poor health and failing eyesight, or because, like her husband, she quietly disagreed with Mao's economic policies, although she remained a member of the Central Committee and the National People's Congress. Her husband opposed the Cultural Revolution from the start, and Cai, as a veteran of the Long March, was also in disgrace during that period. Her standing as a model revolutionary was restored from 1978.

== Later life and death ==
Cai had become completely blind by 1984. On International Women's Day in 1989, she was awarded a commemorative medal in recognition of her decades of service, which her long-time colleague Kang Keqing accepted on her behalf because of her blindness. Cai died of illness in Beijing on 11 September 1990. She was buried alongside her husband, who predeceased in 1975, at Babaoshan Revolutionary Cemetery in Beijing.

== Personal life ==
Cai's husband, Li Fuchun, held senior posts in the party's Organisation Department from 1935 to 1948 and later became one of its leading economic planners, helping to secure Soviet aid for China's heavy industry and chairing the State Planning Commission from 1954. In the mid-1920s, their marriage came under strain when Cai learned that he was having an affair with a factory worker, and she insisted that he end it.

Cai and Li Fuchun's only child, a daughter named Li Tete, was born in Paris on 25 April 1924 and was raised largely by Cai's mother in China. She went to the Soviet Union in 1938 and graduated from the Timiryazev Agricultural Academy in Moscow in 1952. After returning to China, she worked in agricultural research for the Chinese Academy of Agricultural Sciences, and after retiring she devoted herself to poverty relief through the China Foundation for Poverty Alleviation. She died on 16 February 2021.

== See also ==
- Historical Museum of French-Chinese Friendship
