= Wang Jinmei (revolutionary) =

Chinese revolutionary (1898–1925)

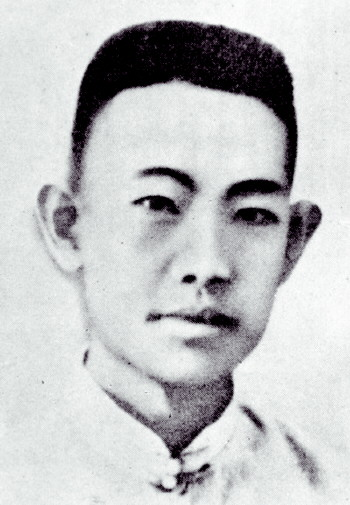

Wang Jinmei (Chinese: 王尽美; pinyin: Wáng Jìnměi; June 14, 1898 – August 19, 1925), born Wang Ruijun, courtesy name Zhuozai, was a Chinese revolutionary and an early participant of the Chinese Communist Party (CCP).

== Biography ==
Wang Jinmei was born in Ju County of Shandong on June 14, 1898. His birthdate remains disputed. During a visit to Moscow, an entry form at Manchuria in 1921 listed his birthdate as April 20, 1899.

In summer 1918, Wang enrolled in the 1st Shandong Normal School. He participated in the May Fourth Movement, where he was elected as a leader in an anti-Japanese students' association. In March 1920, Wang became a research member of the Marxism Research Group of Peking University. In autumn of the same year, he was involved in the formation of the Li Sin Society, along with Deng Enming and several other classmates in Shandong. The society published the Luoyuansinkan, a bi-weekly.

In spring 1921, he co-founded a branch of the CCP at Jinan. Representing the branch, in July 1921 he left for Shanghai to attend the 1st National Congress of the Chinese Communist Party. In January 1922, Wang was present at the 1st Congress of Far Eastern Revolutionary Organizations in Moscow and met Vladimir Lenin. In July 1922, he attended the 2nd National Congress of the CCP in Shanghai. In the same month, the CCP branch at Shandong was established. He was appointed as the Shandong division leader of the Chinese Labor Secretariat (predecessor of the All-China Federation of Trade Unions), and was involved in the drafting of the Labour Law Memorandum. In November 1922, Wang spearheaded the formation of a CCP branch at Shanhaiguan. He led labor strikes at Shanhaiguan and Qinhuangdao. In February 1923, he was arrested at Shanhaiguan and thrown in jail at Lingyu, which was responded by a protest that forced the magistrate official to order his release. Wang returned to Shandong and joined the CCP in October 1923.

In January 1924, he attended the 1st National Congress of the Kuomintang at Guangzhou. In November, he was appointed as the secretary of CCP Shandong. He met Sun Yat-sen, who promoted him as a commissioner for the Propaganda Unit of the National Assembly, responsible for propaganda production and National Assembly meetings at Shandong. In January 1925, he attended the 4th National Congress of the CCP. By February, despite contracting tuberculosis, he continued several strike efforts of railroad workers. On March 1, he went to Beijing to attend the National Assembly. By April, his sickness worsened, and he died at Qingdao on August 19, 1925, aged 27.

== Family ==
Wang had two children:

- Wang Naizheng (1919 - 2009), former vice-commander of the Jilin Military Region.
- Wang Nai-en (born 1922), former party vice-secretary of the Shanghai Municipal Transport Commission.

== See also ==
- All-China Federation of Trade Unions
