= 2nd National Congress of the Chinese Communist Party =

1922 Chinese Communist Party conference

2nd National Congress of the Chinese Communist Party 中国共产党第二次全国代表大会
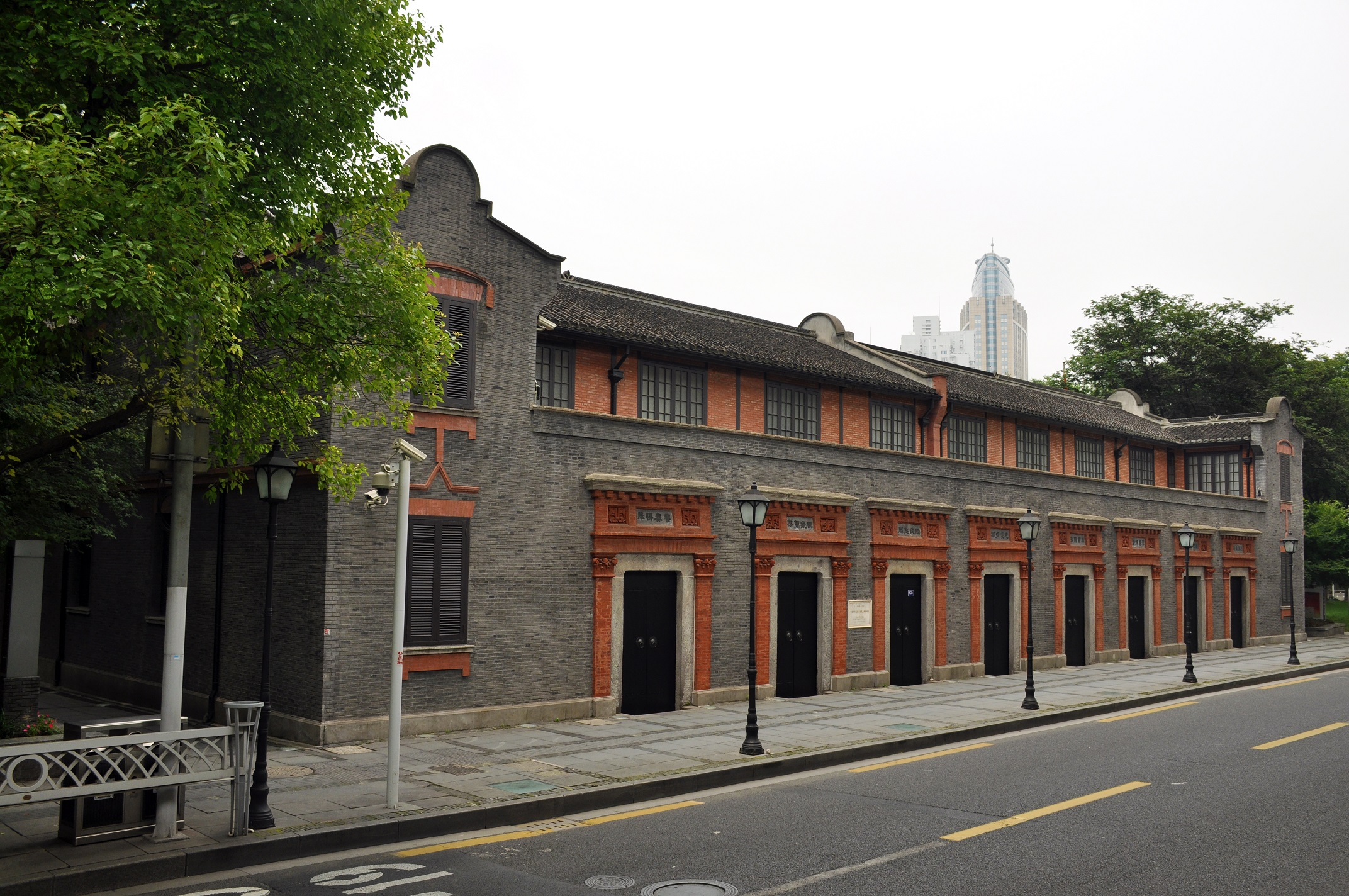
- Present site of 625 Pude Lane, where the 2nd Congress took place.
- Begins: July 16, 1922
- Ends: July 23, 1922
- Locations: Li Da's apartment, 625 Pude Lane, South Chengdu Road, Shanghai International Settlement
- Previous event: 1st National Congress of the Chinese Communist Party (1921)
- Next event: 3rd National Congress of the Chinese Communist Party (1923)
- Participants: 12 representatives
- Major events: Election held to form the 2nd Central Executive Committee of the Chinese Communist Party
- Leader: Chen Duxiu (Leader of the Chinese Communist Party)

2nd National Congress of the Chinese Communist Party
- Traditional Chinese: 中國共產黨第二次全國代表大會
- Simplified Chinese: 中国共产党第二次全国代表大会
Transcriptions
Standard Mandarin
- Hanyu Pinyin: Zhōngguó Gòngchǎndǎng Dìèrcì Quánguó Dàibiǎo Dàhuì

Abbreviated name
- Chinese: 二大
Transcriptions
Standard Mandarin
- Hanyu Pinyin: Èr dà

The 2nd National Congress of the Chinese Communist Party was held in the Shanghai International Settlement at the apartment of Li Da of 625 Pude Lane, South Chengdu Road, between July 16 and July 23, 1922. The congress was attended by 12 representatives, representing 195 members of the Chinese Communist Party (CCP). The congress succeeded the 1st National Congress of the Chinese Communist Party and preceded the 3rd National Congress of the Chinese Communist Party.

== Attendance ==
No credible attendance records of the event remain. When the 6th National Congress of the Chinese Communist Party was held in Moscow in 1928, the attendance list was reconstructed and noted 12 names: Chen Duxiu, Zhang Guotao, Li Da, Yang Mingzhai, Luo Zhanglong, Wang Jinmei, Xu Baihao, Mao Zedong, Tan Pingshan, Li Zhenying, and Shi Cuntong. However, this list, according to historians, only denoted the representatives of the congress and does not include the actual members that attended the congress in person. Mao, for instance, claimed to have received news to attend the congress, but failed to attend. In an interview by American journalist Edgar Snow published in his book Red Star Over China, Mao stated that his absence was due to miscommunication.

== Agenda ==
Congress affirmed the adoption of a constitution among several other resolutions that were passed during the congress. This included:

1. the Manifesto of the 2nd National Congress, which announced the CCP is a "branch of the Comintern", and clarified the responsibilities and executive powers held by each leadership position, for the creation of a "unified China" and the formation of a "Chinese democratic republic".
2. Resolution of the CCP on Imperialism and World Events;
3. Resolution On Participation in the Comintern, where the CCP formally accepted the Twenty-one Conditions and became the Chinese branch within the Comintern, contrasting the declarations made in the 1st National Congress which proclaimed the CCP was an "ally" of the Comintern;
4. Resolution on the United Front of Democracy;
5. Resolution on the Affairs of "Trade Union Movements and the CCP";
6. the Youths' Movement Resolution;
7. the Women's Movement Resolution;
8. the Resolution on the Constitution of the CCP, which adopted the Constitution of the CCP, formally accepting Leninist ideologies, and 9 other resolutions.

== Elections ==
The congress elected Chen, Zhang, Cai, Deng Zhongxia, and Gao Junyu to form the 2nd Central Executive Committee of the Chinese Communist Party. Another three backup members were selected. Chen was selected as the general secretary, while Cai and Zhang were given propaganda work. The congress decided to publish the weekly The Guide Weekly (Xiangdao), where Cai was nominated as the head editor.

At the congress, Xiang Jingyu was appointed to lead the CCP's women's movement.

== Other issues ==
During the 2nd National Congress, the CCP decided to establish an authoritative publication to disseminate its views on anti-imperialism and revolution. This resulted in the founding of The Guide Weekly in Shanghai. It was the first openly-published newspaper of the central organ of the CCP.
