= Zhu Shaolian =

Chinese politician (1887–1929)

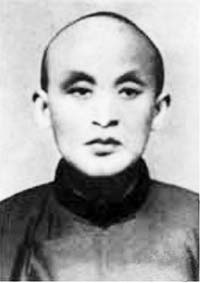
Zhu Shaolian

Zhu Shaolian (Chinese: 朱少连) (1887 – January 8, 1929) courtesy name Hanying (Chinese: 汉英) was a member of the 3rd Central Executive Committee of the Chinese Communist Party. Born in Hengyang, Hunan Province, Zhu joined the Communist Youth League of China in 1921 and the Chinese Communist Party in February 1922. He was introduced into the party by Li Lisan at Anyuan. Originally a railway engineer, Zhu was the first worker to join the party's central committee. At the beginning of September 1927, he was made commanding officer of the 4th Regiment, 1st Division of the Chinese Workers' and Peasants' Red Army in Hunan. He was captured by the Kuomintang on January 4, 1929, and killed 4 days later.
