= Xiang Zhongfa =

Chinese politician (1879–1931)

- 向忠发
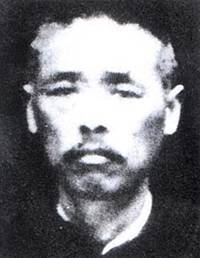
- Xiang, c. 1930s

General Secretary of the Chinese Communist Party
- In office 1 July 1928 – 24 June 1931
- Preceded by: Chen Duxiu
- Succeeded by: Bo Gu

Personal details
- Born: 1879 Shanghai, Qing dynasty
- Died: 24 June 1931 (aged 51–52) Shanghai, Republic of China
- Party: Chinese Communist Party

Xiang Zhongfa (Note: Chinese: 向忠发; pinyin: Xiàng Zhōngfǎ) (1879 – 24 June 1931) was a Chinese socialist who was one of the early senior leaders of the Chinese Communist Party (CCP).

== Early life ==
Xiang was born in 1879 to a poor family living in Hanchuan, Hubei. He dropped out of elementary school to move with his parents to their ancestral home in Hubei. When he was 14 years old, he became an apprentice in a weapons factory in Hanyang, a county of Wuhan.

When the factory closed, Xiang found work as a servant in Jiangxi. Three years later, he was recommended by his employer to work for a liner company in Wuhan. He received a promotion to Second Mate four months later and became Chief Mate after two years.

After several years, Xiang transferred to a ship of the major liner company Han Zhiping. There, he was elected as a labor union leader because of his literacy and activity in worker movements. In 1921, Xiang became the Vice Chairman of Han Zhiping's labor union and joined the CCP.

== Rise to power ==
During the Northern Expedition, the army of Kuomintang (KMT) took over some parts of Hubei and marched towards Wuhan. Xiang and Xu Baihao mobilized workers for strikes against local warlords and set up the labor union of the Hubei province, greatly assisting the KMT army. After the CCP headquarters moved to Wuhan, Xiang was elected a member of the CCP Central Committee for his contributions. Xiang was then among the most prominent worker activists, along with Su Zhaozheng, Wang Hebo and Deng Pei.

The CCP-KMT alliance (First United Front) was facing uncertainty with occasional conflicts arising between these two parties. Xiang expressed his discontent directly, as compared to the more compromising attitude of then party secretary Chen Duxiu, who did not attach much importance to worker leaders. The resolute standpoint of Xiang made a great impression on the Comintern, which issued a telegram on July 14, 1927, to denounce the central organs of the CCP, saying there were signs of opportunism in its compromise policy in relation to the KMT, and decreeing that all CCP members should fight against this opportunism. The basic task of reform "should make leaders of workers and peasants have decisive influence in the CCP", according to the Comintern. This view was more in line with Xiang's hard stance.

As a result, at the conference of the CCP on August 7, 1927, the CCP fired Chen Duxiu and selected Su and Xiang as interim members of the politburo of the CCP. Even so, the CCC's new leadership of Qu Qiubai and Li Weihan was still dominated by intellectuals, contrary to the Comintern's ideals.

In October 1927, the Comintern asked the CCP to organize a delegation to Moscow to attend the celebration ceremony of 10th anniversary of the October Revolution. Many CCP leaders had taken refuge in Guangdong and Hong Kong after the failure of the Nanchang Uprising, and were still there. Su and Li Weihan were still on their way from Wuhan to Shanghai. This left the CCP central organization in disarray, and Xiang was elected to be the director of the delegation to the Soviet Union.

On October 15, 1927, Xiang and eight other delegates left for the Soviet Union. They reached Moscow in November, and were warmly welcomed by their Russian counterparts. Xiang attended a celebration ceremony and several major conferences for joint Comintern and Soviet communist activities, and gave talks on Soviet radio.

His experience and understanding of workers' movements in China earned him prestige in the Comintern. The Eastern Department of the Comintern was happy to have Xiang help them handle Chinese affairs, such as stopping a Chinese student protest in Moscow Eastern University.

At the same time, the interim politburo of the CCP had an extended meeting in Shanghai with the new elected Zhou Enlai and Luo Yinong being intellectuals too, and with Wang Hebo being executed by the KMT early before and Su coming to Moscow as delegate to Comintern, there was no representative of worker in this central organ of CCP, which should be a direct violation of Comintern policy.

In January 1928 Xiang wrote letters to Joseph Stalin and Nikolai Bukharin, denouncing the CCP. These letters won attention of Stalin and Bukharin, who became concerned at what Xiang pointed out. Then in March 1928, the Comintern asked the CCP to hold its 6th National Congress in Moscow, which should have reshuffled the leadership of the CCP. With the opening of this congress on June 18, Xiang was appointed as the chairman of the opening and closing sessions, which implied that a promotion was at hand. In this congress, Xiang attacked both the leftism of Qu Qiubai and the rightism of Zhang Guotao, essentially claiming himself to be the only orthodox representative of Chinese revolution. The day before the closing session of this congress, Pavel Mif, the minister of the Eastern Department of the Comintern, also known as the president of Moscow Sun Yat-sen University and mentor of 28 Bolsheviks, on behalf of the Comintern brought forward a list of candidates for the Central Committee of the CCP. The Central Committee at that time consisted of 36 members, with 22 workers among them, and stressed obedience to Comintern policy. Xiang was elected as member of the Politburo and made General Secretary of the CCP, which was no great surprise. This ending was a certainty from the beginning, for of the 84 delegates attending this congress, 50 of them were proletariat, compared with the previous congress in 1926, when 71 of the 82 delegates were intellectuals. So it was no wonder that Zhou Enlai would express his discontent by saying there were "a lot of mobs" in this 6th National Congress.

== Decline and fall in Shanghai ==
Once Xiang was elected paramount leader of the CCP, it was inappropriate for him to stay in Moscow any longer. So Xiang came back to Shanghai to oversee the daily work of the CCP headquarters, assisted by new members of politburo Cai Hesen and alternate member Li Lisan.

Xiang officially ran the headquarters of the CCP after September 1928. There were several notable events under his direction. First, he sacked Cai's membership in the politburo for Cai's extremism towards the Sunzi Division of the CCP, which resulted in severe discontent at the CCP center. Second, Xiang issued the Paper of the Central Committee of the CCP to all CCP members, in which he emphasized that incorrect ideas in the revolution should be corrected, and that the CCP should fight against dangers of bourgeois thoughts and actions. Third, Xiang proposed a series reforms of CCP organs, such as a merger of the labor union with the worker committee, of the propaganda department with the peasant committee, and the establishment of a military committee in the politburo. The boldest proposed reform involved the CCP headquarters taking over the work of the Jiangsu Division of the CCP, which was very near Shanghai. But this last proposal was objected to by Zhou Enlai, who won support from other leaders. In the end, Xiang had to give up this proposal.

During the reign of Xiang, Li Lisan gradually began to play an important role. When Xiang sacked Cai, he chose Li to replace Cai, who became one of only four standing members of the politburo, and was named Minister of the Propaganda Department in October 1928. When in 1929 the Far East Bureau of the Comintern issued an order regarding anti-rightism, in which it blamed the CCP for not being active enough in this area, Xiang protested against this decision. He chose Li as an appropriate candidate for the Propaganda Department because he was eloquent and energetic. Thus, Li took the job of handling conflicts with the Comintern. When Xiang sent Zhou Enlai to Moscow to provide further explanations, Li took over Zhou's former role in the organization too, which gave Li a larger stage to prove his talent.

When Xiang learned of the Comintern's decision on anti-rightism, he claimed that the Chinese Communist Revolution was in its peak period. Li turned this blindness into extremism, which was later known as the Li Lisan line, calling for armed uprising in the cities and extension of revolution to whole country. From June 1930, the Li Lisan line matured under the support from Xiang. The CCP gave up the daily operation from its headquarters, turning it over to divisions in all provinces. It set up action committees in all provinces, and began preparing for a full-scale uprising in October. But the Comintern expressed its discontent by stating that it was working out systemic policies for Chinese revolution, and that the CCP should concentrate instead on the uprising in one or several provinces instead. Xiang stood by Li, both refuting that it was zero hour of Chinese revolution. In several rounds of discussion, the tension between Xiang, Li, and the Comintern rose greatly. The suspicion and criticism by the CCP towards the Comintern was the same as betrayal in the eyes of the Comintern.

As a result of the extremism and blindness of the Li Lisan line, the CCP suffered great losses. The Comintern sent Qu Qiubai and Zhou Enlai back to China to enforce its policies. The 28 Bolsheviks sent back by their mentors to take charge of the Chinese Communist Revolution took advantage of this opportunity to denounce Li. Xiang and Li still did not realize the clear and present danger and criticized these young, immature students heavily. Then the Comintern sent a telegram recalling Li to Moscow to account for his policies. Pavel Mif went to Shanghai as an envoy of the Comintern too. Under Mif's direction, the 4th Plenary Meeting of 6th National Congress of the CCP was held, Li was replaced by Mif's protégé Wang Ming, and his associates Bolsheviks took other important jobs. Although Xiang sought to tender his resignation, the Comintern and senior leaders of the CCP, such as Qu and Zhou, thought Xiang's symbolic value as a worker among the CCP leadership might still be helpful to the revolution, so they blocked his resignation.

But Xiang's role as paramount leader was put to an end with the key work of the CCP changing from cities to Soviet territories in the countryside, with which Xiang was unfamiliar and had no experience at all. Wang Ming, then serving as the leader of the CCP, despised the old CCP members, leading labor activists He Mengxiong (Chinese: 何孟雄) and Luo Zhanglong (Chinese: 罗章龙) to attempt to set up a rival Party center. Although this effort failed, He and the other 24 members of this group were arrested and executed by the KMT later, and the CCP's power in Shanghai was thereby greatly weakened. Aware of being a puppet, Xiang lost confidence in both the revolution and communism. He changed his interest to women and living a luxurious life. Using the party's expense account, Xiang lived in villa with his mistress, which brought about great criticisms from CCP members and made Zhou Enlai nervous, for it was already tough enough for Zhou to ensure the security of senior leaders.

Xiang's extravagant life lasted only a short time. With the arrest and defection in 1931 of one of Zhou's senior subordinate, Gu Shunzhang, who was the security guard boss of the CCP at that time, Gu sold Xiang out. Xiang was arrested on June 21, 1931, in the jewelry store he used as a front in the French Concession in the city of Shanghai. Xiang was captured in the company of his mistress, Yang Xiuzhen, a cabaret dancer at local Shanghai nightclubs. In short order, Xiang revealed all he knew about the CCP and its secret services to his KMT captors but was shot before a counterorder signed by Chiang Kai-shek to pardon him ever reached his jailers.

== Xiang’s role ==
As the only General Secretary to defect from the CCP and be executed by the Kuomintang, Xiang was regarded as a disgrace in CCP history. The CCP sought to erase any memory of him. It was said he had been already dead, only his body was still alive at the time of his execution; he used to be an ambitious and active revolutionist, but the power struggle made him desperate.

During the early years of the CCP, Xiang was not alone as a representative of the proletariat. In the 6th National Congress, the Central Committee elected 22 members from workers, 14 of which defected to the KMT later. It was no surprise that after Xiang's arrest and execution, another member of politburo, Lu Futan (Chinese: 卢福坦) who also came from the working class, expressed his wish to succeed Xiang as General Secretary. The Comintern rejected the proposal and chose students such as Wang Ming and Bo Gu, who had studied in the Soviet Union and were members of 28 Bolsheviks. They were seen as more trustworthy to take the leadership of the CCP, although they had no experience compared to the worker activists.

== Sources ==
- The Documents of Central Committee of CCP
- Xiang’s letter to Bukharin
- Gao Jun.Some issues on the defection of Xiang
- The Selected Works of Zhou Enlai

Party political offices
Preceded by Chen Duxiu	General Secretary of the Chinese Communist Party; 1928–1931	Succeeded by Li Lisan
