= Xu Meikun =

Chinese Communist Party member (1893–1997)

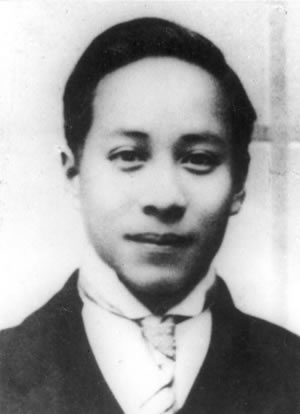
Xu Meikun

Xu Meikun (Chinese: 徐梅坤) (1893 – January 17, 1997) was an alternate member of the 3rd Central Executive Committee of the Chinese Communist Party. He was born in Xiaoshan District, Hangzhou, Zhejiang Province. He joined the Chinese Communist Party (CCP) in 1922 and was one of its earliest worker members. In 1927, he was betrayed to the Kuomintang and imprisoned for 8 years. In September 1935, he was released and left the CCP. He was reinstated in 1981, at the age of 88.
