= 3rd Central Executive Committee of the Chinese Communist Party =

The 3rd Central Executive Committee of the Chinese Communist Party (Chinese: 中国共产党第三届中央执行委员会) was in session from 1923 to 1925, while China was a republic. The 2nd Central Executive Committee of the Chinese Communist Party preceded it. The 4th Central Executive Committee of the Chinese Communist Party followed.

The 3rd Central Bureau of the Chinese Communist Party held a plenary session at this time.

== Composition ==
=== Members ===
Members of the 3rd Central Executive Committee of the Chinese Communist Party
Name		2nd CEC	4th CEC	Birth	PM	Death	Birthplace	Portrait	Ref.
Cai Hesen	蔡和森	Old	Elected	1895	1921	1931	Shanghai		
Chen Duxiu	陳獨秀	Old	Elected	1879	1921	1942	Anhui		
Li Dazhao	李大釗	Old	Elected	1889	1921	1927	Zhili		
Luo Zhanglong	罗章龙	New	Alternate	1896	1921	1995	Hunan		
Mao Zedong	毛泽东	New	Not	1893	1921	1976	Hunan		
Tan Pingshan	谭平山	New	Elected	1886	1921	1956	Guangdong		
Wang Hebo	王荷波	New	Alternate	1882	1922	1927	Fujian		
Xiang Ying	项英	New	Elected	1895	1921	1941	Anhui		
Zhu Shaolian	朱少连	New	Not	1887	1922	1929	Hunan		

=== Alternates ===
Alternates of the 3rd Central Executive Committee of the Chinese Communist Party
Name		2nd CEC	4th CEC	Birth	PM	Death	Birthplace	Portrait	Ref.
Deng Pei	邓培	New	Alternate	1884	1921	1927	Guangdong		
Deng Zhongxia	邓中夏	Alternate	Not	1894	1921	1933	Jiangsu		
Li Hanjun	李汉俊	New	Not	1890	1921	1927	Hubei		
Xu Meikun	徐梅坤	New	Not	1893	1921	1997	Zhejiang		
Zhang Lianguang	张连光	New	Not	?	?	?	Fujian		
