= Li Lisan =

Chinese politician (1899–1967)

- 李立三
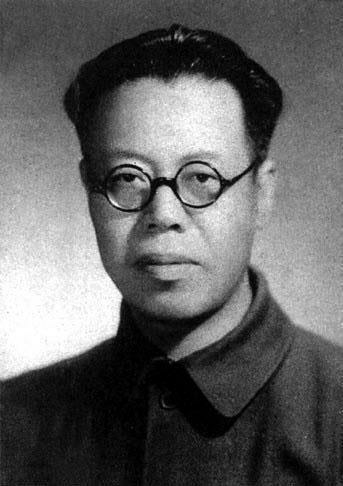

Member of the Central People's Government Committee of People's Republic of China
- In office 1st Plenary Session of the Chinese people's Political Consultative Conference
- In office 1949–1954
- Chairman: Mao Zedong
- Preceded by: He Long
- Succeeded by: Lin Boqu

Member of the Government Administration Council of the Central People's Government
- In office 21 October 1949 – 12 September 1954
- Premier: Zhou Enlai
- Preceded by: Zhang Bojun
- Succeeded by: Ma Xulun

President of the Soviet government in Hunan
- In office 1930–1931

Director of the Central Committee of the Chinese Communist Party
- In office March 1930 – August 1930
- Preceded by: Zhou Enlai
- Succeeded by: Zhou Enlai

Head of the Publicity Department of the Chinese Communist Party
- In office November 1928 – December 1930
- Preceded by: Cai Hesen
- Succeeded by: Shen Zemin

Alternate Member of the 6th Politburo of the Chinese Communist Party
- In office 1928–1945

Member of the 5th Politburo of the Chinese Communist Party
- In office 1927–1928

Personal details
- Born: Li Longzhi (李隆郅); 18 November 1899 Liling County, Zhuzhou, Hunan, Qing China
- Died: 22 June 1967 (aged 67) Beijing, China
- Party: Chinese Communist Party
- Spouse(s): Lin Xingxian; Li Yichun; Li Chongshan; Lisa Kishkin (d. 2015)
- Children: Li Renjun (李人俊); Li Renji (李人纪); Li Jing (李竞); Li Li (李力); Xie Zhipei (谢志佩); Li Yingnan (李英男); Li Yanlan (李雅兰)
- Parent: Li Changgui (李昌圭)
- Education: Lujiang Middle School; Changjun High School; Guangyi High School
- Occupation: Politician

Li Lisan (Chinese: 李立三; pinyin: Lǐ Lìsān; 18 November 1899 – 22 June 1967) was a Chinese communist leader and labour organiser. He joined the Chinese Communist Party (CCP) in 1921, led the 1922 strike at the Anyuan coal mines, and became one of the party's main labour organisers. From 1928, he was one of the party's effective leaders, and in 1930 he pursued a strategy of urban uprisings, later known as the "Li Lisan line", which ended in heavy losses. The Comintern recalled him to Moscow, where he spent about 15 years. After the founding of the People's Republic of China, he served as Minister of Labour and led the All-China Federation of Trade Unions, until he was criticised in 1951 over the role of trade unions. He died in 1967 during the Cultural Revolution, reportedly by suicide, after being persecuted, and the CCP rehabilitated him in 1980.

== Early life ==
Li was born on 18 November 1899 in Liling, Hunan, under the name Li Longzhi. His father was a rural schoolteacher. According to The Beijing News, in 1917, at the age of 18, Li publicly accused an education official in Liling of corruption, and his angry father sold land to pay for him to study in France.

== France ==
After the May Fourth Movement, Li went to France in 1919 as part of the work-study programme. He worked in a steel factory, took part in strikes and studied Marxism. In 1921, he founded a labour study society with Zhao Shiyan. He took part in the occupation of the Sino-French University in Lyon in 1921, and he was deported by the French authorities in October that year.

== Labour organiser ==
=== Anyuan ===
Li arrived in Shanghai in December 1921, and he joined the CCP soon afterwards. Mao Zedong then sent him to the Anyuan coal mines in Pingxiang, Jiangxi, where he was told to work first through legal channels under the banner of mass education. There, he set up a school for workers' children and a night school for workers, and in February 1922 he became secretary of the local party branch. He drew on local customs such as lion dances and lantern festivals to win a following, and he did not dispel rumours that he was invulnerable to bullets. He also negotiated with the leader of the Red Gang, a local secret society, who agreed to close its opium dens and gambling houses and to stop looting during the coming strike.

The Anyuan strike began on 14 September 1922 and lasted five days. Li was the strike's commander, and Liu Shaoqi was its chief negotiator. Li wrote the strike manifestos, with the slogan "Once beasts of burden, now we will be men!" The strikers won almost all of their demands, including recognition of the workers' club. The party's official history describes it as the first strike led independently by the CCP to end in complete victory. In 1928, a report prepared during a Kuomintang (KMT) pacification campaign credited Li's educational work for the strength of the CCP at Anyuan:

It was only after the Communist bandit Li Lisan went to Anyuan…that the knowledge of how to organise became widespread. Now workers were speaking up at public meetings and even giving lectures!

=== Shanghai and Wuhan ===
In April 1924, Li became head of the labour and peasant department of the CCP's Shanghai committee. The party gave Li and Liu Shaoqi joint responsibility for directing the strike wave of the May Thirtieth Movement in 1925. On the day after the May Thirtieth shootings, Li became chairman of the newly founded Shanghai General Labour Union. He was also initiated into the Green Gang. In September 1926, he became director of the Hankou office of the All-China Federation of Trade Unions, and in January 1927 he helped to recover the British concessions in Hankou and Jiujiang.

At the 5th National Congress of the CCP in 1927, he was elected to the Central Committee and the Politburo. After the split between the KMT and the CCP, he was appointed to the front committee led by Zhou Enlai and helped to plan the Nanchang uprising of August 1927. In October 1927, he wrote a report on its lessons. According to Time, he opposed the Canton uprising of December 1927, which was pressed by the Comintern agents Heinz Neumann and Besso Lominadze.

== Party leadership ==
At the 6th National Congress, held in Moscow in 1928, Li was elected to the Central Committee. In November 1928, he became a member of the Politburo and of its standing committee, and he was made head of the party's Propaganda Department. From then on, he was one of the party's effective leaders.

In June 1930, while presiding over the work of the Politburo, Li pushed a strategy of armed uprisings in China's major cities, which the party later condemned as "left adventurism" and named the "Li Lisan line". According to Encyclopædia Britannica, he carried out the strategy on the orders of the Comintern, and it differed from Mao's approach based on the peasantry. The historian James P. Harrison described the line as an attempt to use the rural Red Army to build an urban base for the revolution. In July 1930, a small communist force seized Changsha, the capital of Hunan, but government forces soon retook the city, and the communists suffered heavy losses. According to the historian Lawrence R. Sullivan, the urban uprisings were disastrous for the party, and its membership in Shanghai fell to about 500 by 1931–1932.

The Comintern blamed Li for the defeats. At the third plenary session of the 6th Central Committee in September 1930, he admitted his errors, made a self-criticism and left the party leadership. The Returned Students, a group of young party members who had studied in Moscow, and the labour organiser He Mengxiong criticised his centralised and "patriarchal" style of leadership. After the fourth plenary session in January 1931, the Returned Students controlled the party's provisional Central Committee in Shanghai.

At the request of the Comintern, Li went to Moscow, where he remained for about 15 years. He worked on Comintern publications, edited the Chinese-language newspaper Jiuguo Shibao, and handled the party's secret communication codes. According to Time, he also worked at the Far Eastern University in Moscow. In the 1930s, he met Lisa Kishkin, a Russian woman from an aristocratic family who had studied French, and they married in Moscow. During the Great Purge, he was arrested by the NKVD in 1938, and he was freed in 1940, reportedly with the help of Zhou Enlai. During the Second Sino-Japanese War, he repeatedly asked to return to China. He did not attend the 7th National Congress of the CCP in 1945, but he was re-elected to the Central Committee.

Li returned to China in early 1946, and his wife joined him there the same year. Time reported in September 1946 that he had reappeared in the top circles of the party after 14 years in Moscow. He served as the chief CCP representative in the north-eastern group of the Executive Headquarters, which supervised the truce between the KMT and the CCP, and he was a member of the party's Northeast Bureau. He later became vice-chairman of the All-China Federation of Trade Unions and secretary of its party group, and he headed the party's Central Workers' Movement Committee. In 1949, he was a member of the standing committee of the preparatory committee for the Chinese People's Political Consultative Conference.

== People's Republic of China ==
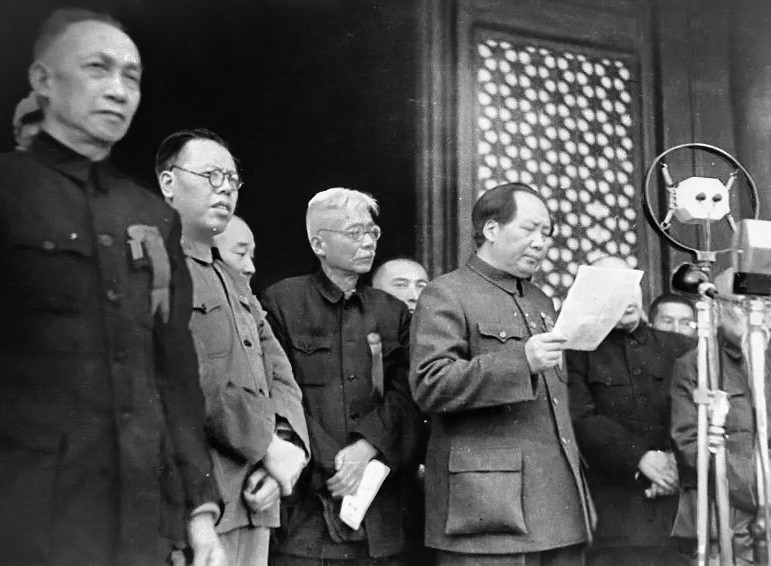
Li, second from left, at the proclamation of the People's Republic of China in 1949

After the founding of the People's Republic in October 1949, Li became a member of the Central People's Government Council and of the Government Administration Council, and he was appointed Minister of Labour. In 1951, Time described him as the head of all of China's labour organisations, and it expected his importance to grow as the country turned to industry.

=== Trade union dispute ===
In 1951, Li argued that trade unions were needed even in state-owned enterprises to represent the workers. In a speech that year, he said that the union had the function of "crying out" to keep management balanced between public and private interests. In October 1951, he sent Mao a report asking him to take a position in the debate over the role of the unions, but he received no reply. On 20 December 1951, the party group of the All-China Federation of Trade Unions criticised him at an enlarged meeting, accusing him of denying the leading role of the party. According to the historian Luo Xiaohui, he was charged with "syndicalism" and "narrow economism". He was removed from the trade union leadership and replaced by Lai Ruoyu, and he was dismissed as Minister of Labour about three years later.

=== Later career ===
Li later served as a deputy director of the party's industrial and transport work department, and he was secretary of the secretariat of the party's North China Bureau. He was a member of the 8th Central Committee and a member of the standing committees of the 3rd and 4th National Committees of the CPPCC. In a letter of 3 March 1957, he asked Mao whether a person who had once followed a mistaken line must always be regarded as a bad party member. According to his daughter Li Yingnan, Mao accepted the point and removed related passages from his speech On the Correct Handling of Contradictions Among the People. In 1964, after the Sino-Soviet split, Lisa Kishkin took Chinese citizenship with the approval of Zhou Enlai.

== Cultural Revolution and death ==
During the Cultural Revolution, Li was labelled a counter-revolutionary, and he was subjected to repeated struggle sessions and interrogations. On 21 June 1967, at a Red Guard rally, he and his wife were denounced as capitalist roaders, counter-revolutionaries and foreign spies. He died the next day, 22 June 1967. His last writing was an unfinished letter to Mao, dated 20 June 1967, in which he denied the charges against him. According to Britannica, his death was reportedly a suicide. The party's official history attributes his death to persecution by the groups of Lin Biao and Jiang Qing. A review in Publishers Weekly of a biography by the French journalist Patrick Lescot summarised Li's fate as death "at the hand of his own comrades".

After his death, his wife was held at Qincheng Prison until 1975, and she learned of his death from her daughter only in 1976.

== Rehabilitation and legacy ==
In 1980, the CCP rehabilitated Li. In November 2019, People's Daily published an article by the party's Institute of Party History and Literature to mark the 120th anniversary of his birth, which described him as "a loyal proletarian revolutionary fighter".

== Personal life ==
Li's wife Lisa Kishkin moved to China with him in 1946, and she stayed in China after her release from prison. The couple had two daughters, Li Yingnan and Li Yalan. Li Yingnan was three years old when the family moved to China. Both daughters later followed their mother into teaching. She died in a Beijing hospital in May 2015, at the age of 101.

Party political offices
| Previous: Cai Hesen | Head of the Publicity Department of the Chinese Communist Party; 1928-1930 | Next: Shen Zemin |
| Preceded by Xiang Zhongfa | General Secretary of the Chinese Communist Party (acting) under Xiang Zhongfa; 1929–1930 | Succeeded by Wang Ming |
