= Xiang Jingyu =

Chinese revolutionary (1895–1928)

- 向警予
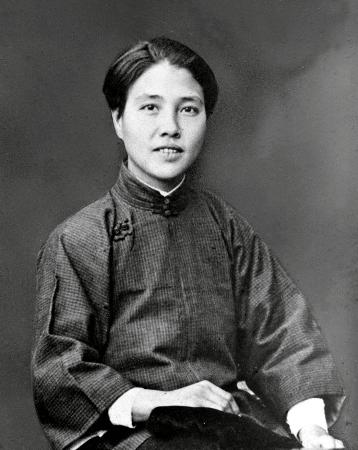

Member of the Central Committee of the Chinese Communist Party

Personal details
- Born: Xiang Junxian; 4 September 1895 Xupu, Hunan, Qing China
- Died: 1 May 1928 (aged 32) Wuhan, Hubei, Republic of China
- Party: Chinese Communist Party
- Spouse: Cai Hesen (1920-1925)
- Children: 2

Military service
- Allegiance: Chinese Communist Party
- Battles/wars: White Terror (China) (executed)

Xiang Jingyu (Chinese: 向警予; pinyin: Xiàng Jǐngyǔ; Wade–Giles: Hsiang Ching-yü, September 4, 1895 – May 1, 1928, née Xiang Junxian) was one of the earliest female members of the Chinese Communist Party (CCP), and described by Chairman Mao Zedong as the only female founder of the CCP, widely regarded as a pioneer of the women's movement of China.

Xiang sought to unite the various women's movements in China around women workers and principles of anti-imperialism. She worked to support labor strikes including those which were part of the May Thirtieth Movement.

In 1928, the Kuomintang (KMT) arrested and executed her.

== Early life ==
Xiang Jingyu was born in Xupu, Hunan province on 4 September 1895. Her father was Xiang Ruiling, may have been of the Tujia ethnicity, a successful businessman, and her mother was Deng Yugui, who died when Xiang Jingyu was young. She had ten siblings. Her brother, Xiang Xianyue, who had studied in Japan, was a leader of Tongmenghui in West Hunan. Xiang Xianyue founded a primary school in Wenchangge in 1903. Xiang Jingyu (then named Xiang Junxian) attended this school because of the influence of her brother and became the first girl who studied in a school in the imperial era of China. Xiang Jingyu was versed in both classical education and modern education.

Xiang Jingyu went to Changsha after the downfall of Qing dynasty with the 1911 Revolution. She renamed herself Xiang Jingyu and attended the First Provincial Women's Normal School of Hunan, but then left this school and attended Zhou Nan Women's School. In this period, Xiang Jingyu was concerned with state affairs. When the humiliating Twenty-One Demands was signed, she and other students made speeches in the streets, hoping to wake the patriotic enthusiasm of Chinese people. After graduating from Zhou Nan Women's School, Xiang Jingyu went back to her hometown. She thought that education could rescue China, so she founded Xupu Primary School under the support of some local progressives. As the principal of this school, she employed some progressive youths as teachers. In contrast to most other schools, her school taught new knowledge and new ideas. At the beginning, there was only one class and dozens of students. However, the numbers of students expanded quickly and reached up to 300.

In 1918, a warlord in Xupu named Zhou Zhelan proposed to marry Xiang and Xiang's father consented to the proposal. Xiang refused, stating that she would "marry the nation and be celibate for life."

In 1919, Xiang joined the New Citizen Study Society, which had been founded by Mao Zedong and Cai Hesen. Xiang Jingyu went to Beijing, and paid a visit to Mr. Cai Yuanpei, the principle of Peking University. In Beijing, Xiang Jingyu met with Cai Hesen and had a good relationship with him.

In January 1920, Xiang and Cai went on a work-study to France. While in France, they married. Their marriage became known as the "Xiang Cai Alliance" or the "looking upward alliance" as a model for marriage based on principles of individual freedom and shared revolutionary beliefs.

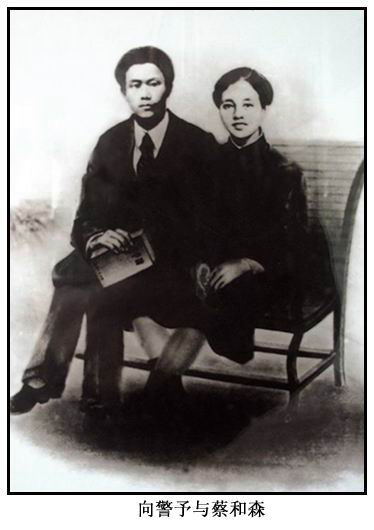
A wedding photo of Xiang Jingyu and Cai He sen

When Xiang Jingyu studied in France, she was concerned with the conditions of the world and China. In France, Xiang studied the works of Karl Marx and concluded that a socialist revolution was necessary to save China. In May 1920, she wrote her first essay analyzing women's issues in China from a Marxist viewpoint. The essay, A Discussion about Women's Issues and Transformation, contended that women's liberation could only be accomplished through the emancipation of the proletariat.

== Revolutionary ==
In 1921, part-time students were expelled from France due to a petition for rights of study and living. Xiang Jingyu went back to China in the same year. In early 1922, Xiang Jingyu was accepted by Chinese Communist Party (CCP) and became one of the earliest female party members. At the Party's 2nd National Congress in July 1922, Xiang was appointed to lead the Party's women's movement. Xiang viewed women laborers as the primary force to achieve a revolution for women in China.

Xiang led the various women's movements in the CCP and had a major impact on Chinese women's movements in the 1920s. Xiang wrote articles for Guide Weekly and Women's Weekly, two publications which aimed to disseminate communist ideals and feminist ideals. In her writing, she elaborated on Chinese women's problems and called for Chinese women to unite and fight for liberation.

On 1 April 1922, she gave birth to her daughter.

In August 1922, Xiang worked with women silk workers in Shanghai to support their strike.

In June 1923, Xiang attended the Party's 3rd National Congress. She drafted the Resolution about the Women's Movement, which emphasized the importance of women workers' movements and stated that shared anti-warlord and anti-imperialist themes could unite the various women's movements in China such as the feminist movement, the women's suffrage movement, and the movement to abolish prostitution. At the Congress, Xiang was appointed to lead the Party's women's movement.

After Party's 3rd National Congress, Xiang prepared a report detailing the women's movements in China. The report recognized the contributions of the feminist and women's suffrage movements in the areas of marriage, politics, and education. It stated however that these had not become mass movements and often involved only a few elite women representatives in government. Xiang's report noted that Christian women's movements in China had taken significant steps to focus on women workers, establishing schools and childcare in factories, and educating women about birth hygiene and discouraging habits like drinking, smoking, and gambling. Xiang stated that these movements relied on foreign capital, and therefore were not independent Chinese women's movements capable of achieving national salvation. These views were significant in shaping the Communist Party's early women's movements.

With the establishment of the United Front with Kuomintang (KMT) in 1923, Xiang became editor of a weekly supplement to The Republican Daily, a KMT newspaper. Xiang also became editor of Women's Weekly.

In 1924, she led a strike involving about ten thousand female workers from silk factories. Then, Xiang Jingyu founded the Committee of Women's Liberation, and trained many female cadres, who then became a force against feudalism and imperialism.

In January 1925, Xiang Jingyu was once again elected to the Central Committee now for the third time. She played a key role in the strikes and protests of the May Thirtieth Movement of 1925.

The growth of the Communist Party after the May Thirtieth Movement also created organizational challenges and disagreements within Party leadership. Some leaders, such as Peng Shuzhi and Chen Duxiu advocated for centralizing Party authority. Others, such as Cai Hesen and Qu Qiubai, advocated for the Party to allow greater flexibility to local bodies. The extramarital relationship between Xiang and Peng exacerbated these disagreements. In the period following the 5th National Congress, the affair harmed Xiang's standing in the Party and resulted in her removal from the Party's core leadership.

In late October 1925, Xiang and Cai were sent to Moscow by the Party, with the hope that they could reconcile. Their relationship dissolved. In late 1926, Cai remarried Li Yichun in Moscow. Xiang studied at the Communist University of the Toilers of the East. She had a relationship with a fellow student from Mongolia.

In March 1927, Xiang returned to China from Moscow. Beginning in April, she led the women's movement in Wuhan, worked at the Party's Hubei Publicity Department, and edit the Party underground newspaper Great River. On 12 April, Chiang Kai-shek started his counter-communism war in Shanghai, and Xiang Jingyu decided to flee to Wuhan and work in the Publicity Department of the Federation of Trade Unions of Wuhan. The Wuhan National Government under Wang Jingwei's administration also expelled the CCP in the July 15 Incident. Regardless of danger, Xiang Jingyu stayed on in Wuhan editing the party journal Chang Jiang and helping the workers' movement and underground Party.

== Capture, strike, and death ==
Xiang was arrested in Wuhan by the KMT during the White Terror, a purge of Communists and those who supported the Communists.

Xiang Jingyu was arrested in the French Concession Sandeli in Wuhan on 20 March 1928 due to the betrayal of members of her group to the police. In prison, she led her cellmates in a hunger strike to demand better treatment. The French officials turned her over to the Nationalist government in April. The KMT police executed her by firing squad on 1 May 1928. Xiang was singing the song "The International" on her way to the Yu Jili Kongping Execution Ground to the onlookers and kept raising slogans. The KMT policemen hurriedly put stones inside her mouth and forced a belt around her cheeks.

== Commemoration ==
Mao Zedong praised Xiang's legacy as a revolutionary. In a 1936 interview with Edgar Snow, he described her as the only female founder of the CCP. At a conference for International Women's Day in 1939, he described Xiang as someone from whom everyone should draw inspiration.

At the inauguration of the Chinese Women's University in the Yan'an Soviet, Zhou Enlai praised Xiang as an important role model for Chinese women.

In 2019 Time created 89 new magazine covers to celebrate women of the year starting from 1920; it chose Xiang for the year 1922, the third year of the magazine.

A statute on Tortoise Mountain in Wuhan honors Xiang.

== Personal life ==
She had two children with Cai Hesen: Cai Ni (蔡妮) and Cai Bo (蔡博).

== See also ==
- Women's rights#China
- Historical Museum of French-Chinese Friendship
