= 5th National Congress of the Chinese Communist Party =

1927 Chinese Communist Party conference

5th National Congress of the Chinese Communist Party 中国共产党第五次全国代表大会
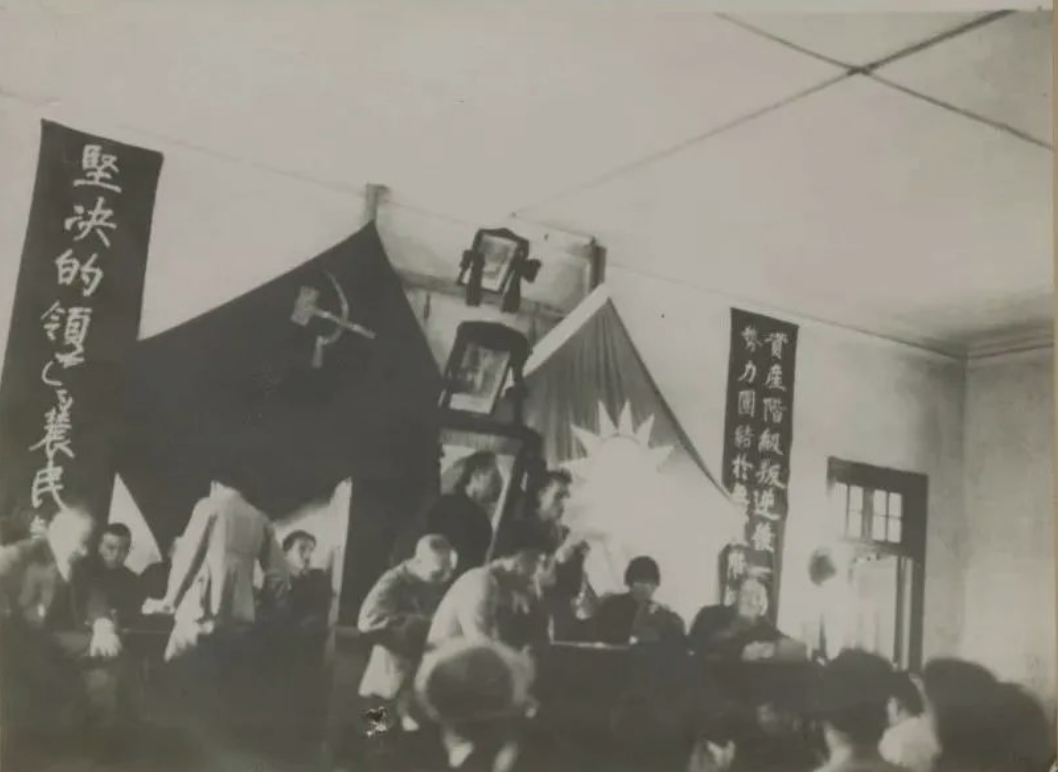
- The conference was held under both the KMT and CCP flags
- Begins: April 27, 1927
- Ends: May 9, 1927
- Location: Wuhan
- Previous event: 4th National Congress of the Chinese Communist Party (1925)
- Next event: 6th National Congress of the Chinese Communist Party (1928)
- Participants: 82 representatives
- Major events: Election held to form the 5th Central Committee of the Chinese Communist Party
- Leader: Chen Duxiu (Leader of the Chinese Communist Party)

The 5th National Congress of the Chinese Communist Party was convened from April 27 to May 9, 1927, in Wuhan, China. The 5th National Congress set in motion the 5th Central Committee. It was preceded by the 4th National Congress and succeeded by the 6th National Congress. The Chinese Civil War had begun following the collapse of the First United Front. 82 representatives were present at the congress.

== Dynamics ==
There were significant disagreement among CCP leadership during the 5th National Congress. During the 5th Congress, Qu Quibai and Cai Hesen criticized Chen Duxiu and Peng Shuzhi for what they described as rightist opportunism, contending that Chen and Peng's approach impeded the progress of worker's movements and leadership of the proletariat. Qu distributed a 70,000 word pamphlet titled Controversial Issues in the Chinese Revolution, asserting that "our party is sick, and the name of the illness is Peng Shuzhi-ism." Peng ceased to be a member of the Politburo after the Congress.

== Impact ==
In the months after the Congress, the CCP convened a meeting to correct what it deemed as Chen Duxiu's rightist opportunism. This also led to establishing the party's Northern Bureau, which was led by Peng, Cai, and Wang Hebo.
