= 6th National Congress of the Chinese Communist Party =

1928 Chinese Communist Party conference

6th National Congress of the Chinese Communist Party 中国共产党第六次全国代表大会
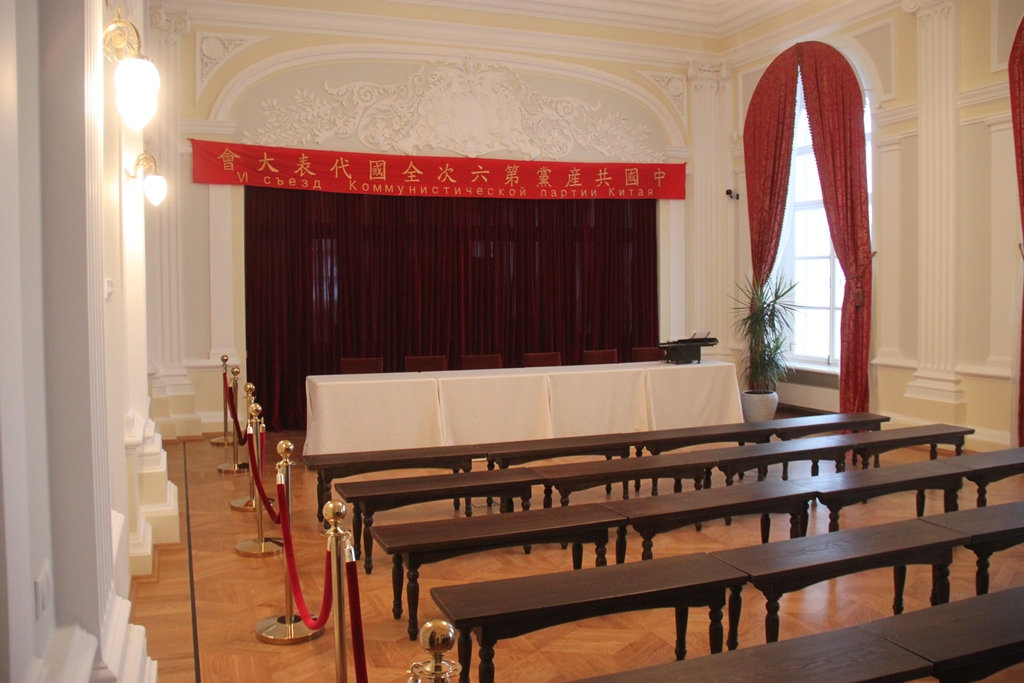
- The hall where the 6th Congress took place, now a museum
- Begins: June 18, 1928
- Ends: July 11, 1928
- Location: Moscow
- Previous event: 5th National Congress of the Chinese Communist Party (1927)
- Next event: 7th National Congress of the Chinese Communist Party (1945)
- Participants: 84 representatives
- Major events: Election held to form the 6th Central Committee of the Chinese Communist Party
- Leader: Xiang Zhongfa (Leader of the Chinese Communist Party)

The 6th National Congress of the Chinese Communist Party was held from June 18 - July 11, 1928 in Moscow, Soviet Union. It is the only national congress of the Chinese Communist Party (CCP) to be held abroad. 142 people attended the Congress, including 82 formal representatives with the right to vote.

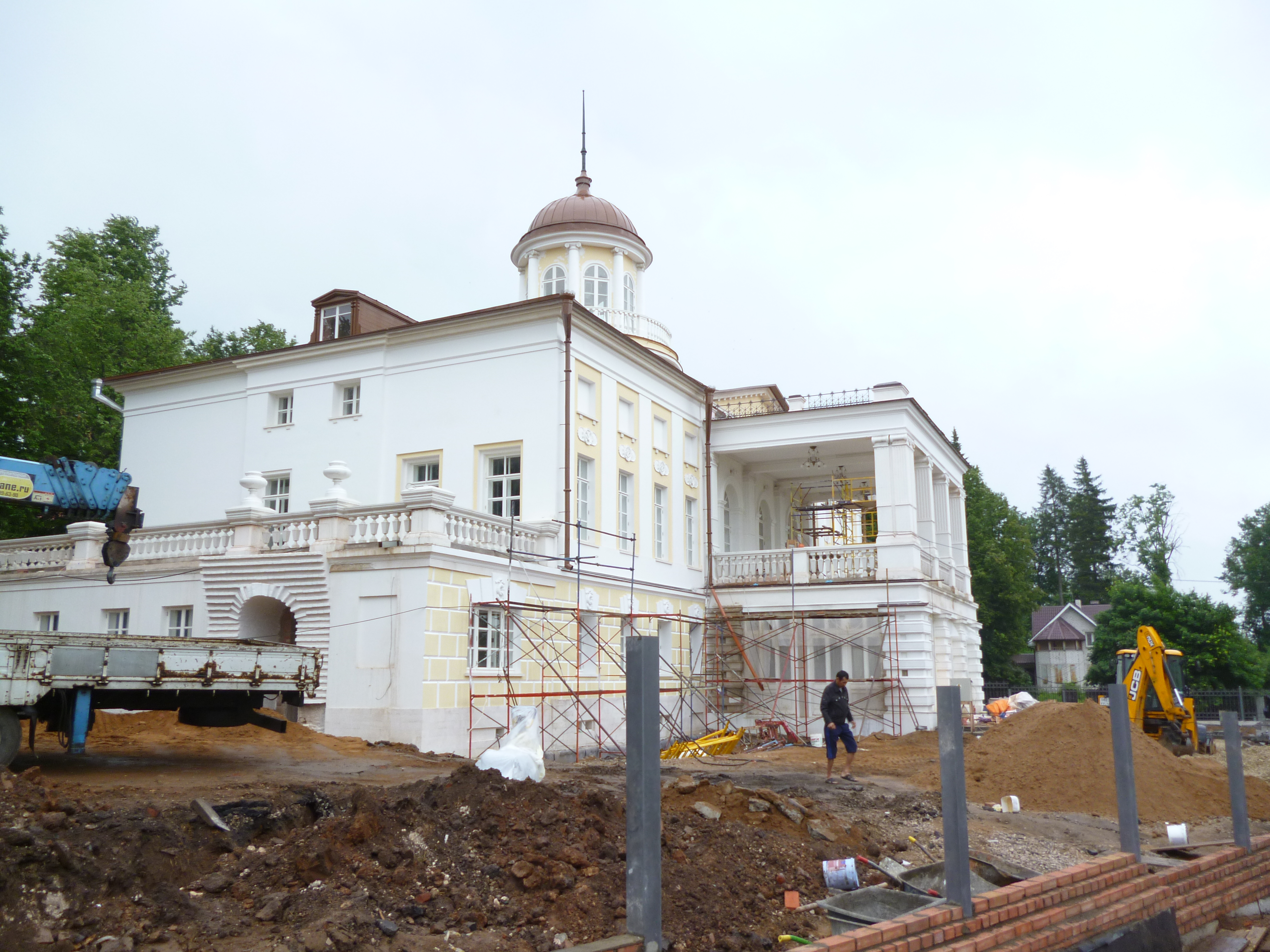
The Pervomayskoe Estate in Moscow where the congress convened.

== Background ==
After the breakup of the first KMT–CCP Alliance, there were disputes within the CCP over the nature of the society and the nature, target, motivation and future of the revolution that the CCP wished to launch. It was urgent to hold a national congress to solve the disputes.

Because the Nationalist Government of China led by Chiang Kai-shek had recently begun a massive wave of persecution against members of the CCP, it was hard to find a place to safely hold the Congress. What's more, the Fourth Congress of the Profintern, the Sixth Congress of the Comintern, and the Fifth Congress of the Young Communist International would be held in Moscow in the spring and summer of 1928. Considering that representatives would be sent to attend these conferences, the CCP decided to hold its sixth congress in Moscow.

In March 1928, the Comintern agreed to hold the 6th National Congress of the Chinese Communist Party in the Soviet Union. From late April, Qu Qiubai, Zhou Enlai and other CCP leaders and more than 100 representatives attending the Sixth Congress secretly went to Moscow in groups.

== Procedure ==
The 6th Congress of the CCP opened on June 18, 1928, hosted by Xiang Zhongfa.

Nikolai Bukharin, Chairman of the Executive Committee of the Communist International, delivered a report on behalf of the Communist International entitled "The Chinese Revolution and the Tasks of the Chinese Communist Party".

Under the direction of the Comintern, the delegates elected the 6th Central Committee of the Chinese Communist Party. The 6th Central Committee's First Plenum, in turn, chose Xiang Zhongfa as General Secretary and elected the 6th Politburo. The five permanent members of the Politburo Standing Committee were Xiang Zhongfa, Zhou Enlai, Su Zhaozheng, Xiang Ying, and Cai Hesen.

The most important topic of discussion was the breakdown of the First United Front between the CCP and the Kuomintang. The Chinese Civil War had begun and the CCP had largely been driven underground. The next National Congress would not take place until 1945.

During the 100th anniversary of the Chinese Communist Party in 2021, the Federal Archival Agency of Russia gave China documents on the 6th congress.

== Impact ==
The Congress has great historical significance to the CCP. It focused on solving two problems that were plaguing the CCP at that time.

Mao Zedong prepared two volumes of documents from the Congress, Before the Sixth Party Congress and After the Sixth Party Congress. Major readings for collective study during the Yan'an Rectification Movement (1942-1945), these volumes contended that Mao represented the correct political line of the CCP and contended that Wang Ming and other rivals of Mao were "rightists."

== Bibliography ==
- Kampen, Thomas (2000). Mao Zedong, Zhou Enlai and the Evolution of the Chinese Communist Leadership. Copenhagen: Nordic Institute of Asian Studies.
