= Luo Zhanglong =

Chinese educator

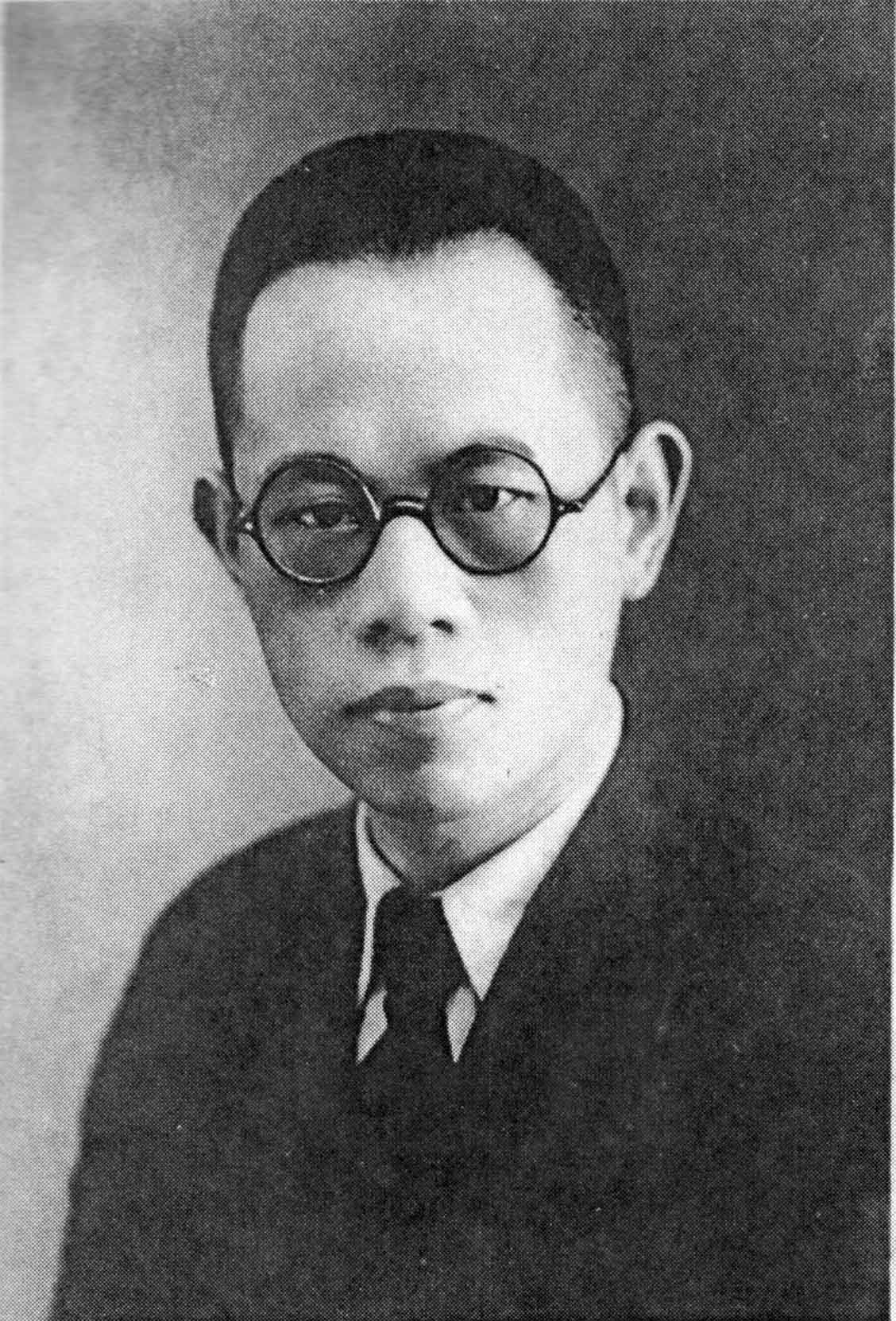
1936年，Luo Zhanglong at Kaifeng Henan University任教

Luo Zhanglong (Chinese: 罗章龙; 30 November 1896 – 3 February 1995) was a Chinese educator. He was born in Liuyang, Hunan Province. He was a member of the 3rd Central Executive Committee of the Chinese Communist Party and an alternate member of the 4th Central Executive Committee of the Chinese Communist Party.

== Bibliography ==
- 罗章龙回忆录，休斯敦：溪流出版社， 2005年
