= Deng Zhongxia =

Chinese trade unionist and politician (1894–1933)

- 邓中夏
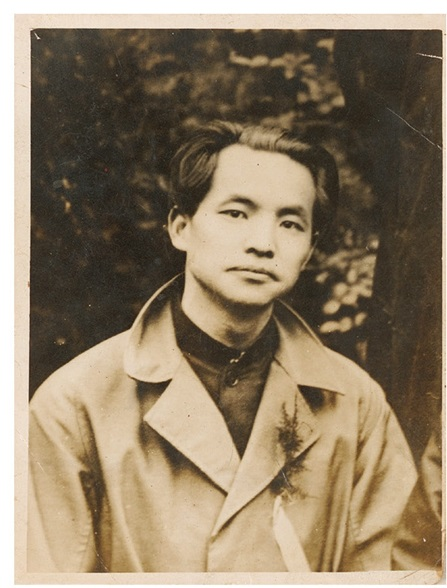

Personal details
- Born: 5 October 1894 Yizhang, Hunan, Qing Empire
- Died: 21 September 1933 (aged 38) Nanjing, Jiangsu, Republic of China
- Cause of death: Executed by the Kuomintang
- Party: Chinese Communist Party
- Education: Peking University

Deng Zhongxia
- Traditional Chinese: 鄧中夏
- Simplified Chinese: 邓中夏
Transcriptions
Standard Mandarin
- Hanyu Pinyin: Dèng Zhōngxià
- Wade–Giles: Teng Chung-hsia

Deng Zhongxia (or Teng Chung-hsia; October 5, 1894 – September 21, 1933) was an early member of the Chinese Communist Party and an important Marxist intellectual and labor movement leader. Having led many strikes and uprisings against Chiang Kai-shek's Kuomintang government, he became one of the most wanted CCP members by the Kuomintang. He was captured and executed in 1933.

== Biography ==
Born in October 1894 in Yizhang, Hunan, Deng was a philosophy graduate of Peking University. He joined the May 4th Movement in 1919 and initiated the Marxist Research Group in the university. In 1920, that group set up a communist organization in which Li Dazhao was elected as the party secretary and of which Deng became a member.

Inspired by communism, Deng became involved in the labor movement in Beijing during the same year. He set up workers' unions and provided education to the workers. In 1922, he was elected as the director of a nationwide labor organization at the First Chinese Labor Meeting held in Guangzhou. In July of the same year, he was elected as a member of the Central Committee of the Chinese Communist Party at the Second Party Congress. In 1923, under Li's recommendation, he received an administrative job from Shanghai University, which was co-founded by the CCP and the Kuomintang during their short-term cooperation. During Deng's tenure, he invited a number of communists, including Cai Hesen, Qu Qiubai and Li Da, to teach at the school. In 1925, after the establishment of the All-China Federation of Labor, Deng was designated as the publicity minister in Guangzhou and organized the Canton-Hong Kong strike, which lasted from June 1925 to October 1926.

When the Kuomintang and the CCP split, Deng proposed an uprising in Nanchang, Jiangxi, to fight against Kuomintang leader Chiang Kai-shek's massacre of CCP members. In the CCP's critical August 7 Meeting in 1927, Deng was a supporter of land revolution and armed struggle. He was also elected as an alternate member of the provisional Political Bureau of the Central Committee of CCP. After the meeting, he was sent to Shanghai to organize the surviving party members. In 1928, he was appointed to Guangzhou and Hong Kong to rebuild destroyed CCP organizations. In 1930, he joined the armed struggle in Hunan and the Western Hubei Communist Base as the political commissar of the No. 2 Red Army with He Long and Zhou Yiqun. In 1932, he secretly returned to Shanghai to continue the underground struggle in the Kuomintang controlled economic hub. However, his identity was discovered, and he was arrested in Shanghai in May 1933.

As Deng was an important CCP leader, his capture drew Chiang Kai-shek's attention. Chiang ordered Deng sent to Nanjing's prison camp and offered him a high position within the Kuomintang with good pay. But Deng refused the offer, and thus was severely tortured before being executed on September 21, 1933.
