= Zhang Tailei =

Chinese revolutionary (1898–1927)

- (simplified Chinese: 张太雷; traditional Chinese: 張太雷; pinyin: Zhāng Tàiléi)
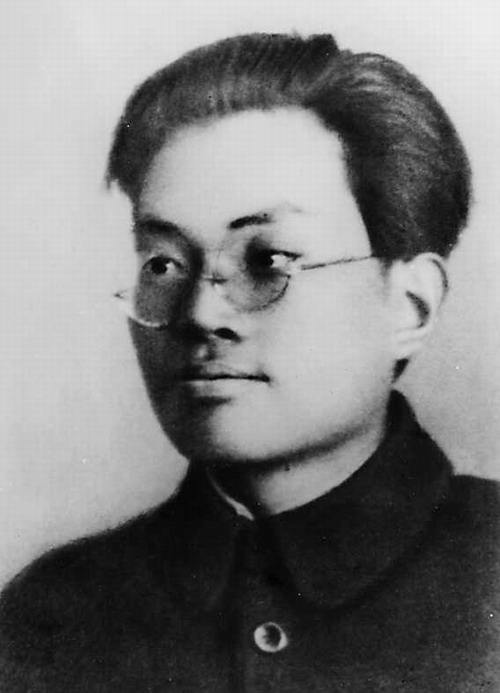
- Born: June 17, 1898; Changzhou, Jiangsu, Qing China
- Died: December 12, 1927 (aged 29); Guangzhou, Guangdong, Republic of China
- Education: Peiyang University (Tianjing University)
- Occupations: Revolutionary, political organizer
- Known for: Founding role in the Communist Youth League of China; leadership in the Guangzhou Uprising
- Political party: Chinese Communist Party

Zhang Tailei (simplified Chinese: 张太雷; traditional Chinese: 張太雷; pinyin: Zhāng Tàiléi; June 1898 – 12 December 1927) was a Chinese revolutionary and an early leader of the Chinese Communist movement. He was active in communist youth organization, served as a representative of the Communist International (Comintern), and was one of the principal leaders of the 1927 Guangzhou Uprising, during which he was killed in action.

== Early life and education ==
Zhang Tailei was born in 1898 in Changzhou, Jiangsu Province. He later attended Peiyang University (now Tianjin University), where he studied law. During his student years, Zhang became involved in political activism influenced by the May Fourth Movement and the spread of Marxist ideas among Chinese intellectuals.

== Revolutionary activities ==
=== Communist youth movement ===
In the early 1920s, Zhang played an important role in organizing socialist youth groups in northern China. These activities contributed to the establishment and early development of the Communist Youth League of China. Contemporary historical accounts describe him as one of the earliest organizers responsible for linking youth political education with party-building efforts.

=== Work with the Communist International ===
Historical records published by the Central Party History and Documentation Research Institute state that Zhang was sent to Soviet Russia in the early 1920s, where he worked with the Communist International (Comintern). According to contemporary historical accounts, he served as a liaison between the Comintern and Chinese communists, assisting in the coordination of organizational work and youth mobilization under Soviet guidance.

=== Guangzhou Uprising ===
Following the collapse of the First United Front in 1927, the Chinese Communist Party (CCP) launched a series of armed uprisings. Zhang Tailei was appointed chairman of the Revolutionary Military Council for the Guangzhou Uprising. The uprising began on 11 December 1927 and attempted to establish communist control of Guangzhou. Nationalist forces suppressed the rebellion within several days, and Zhang was killed in combat on 12 December 1927.

== Legacy ==
Zhang Tailei is remembered as a representative figure of the first generation of Chinese communist revolutionaries. He is particularly noted for his contributions to communist youth organization and for being one of the earliest senior CCP leaders to die during armed revolutionary action.

== Literature ==
- Rae Yang: Spider Eaters, Berkeley: University of California Press, 1997, s. 92.
- Dirlik, Arif (1997). "Narrativizing Revolution: The Guangzhou Uprising (11-13 December 1927) in Workers' Perspective". Modern China. 23 (4): 363–397. doi:10.1177/009770049702300401. JSTOR 189392. S2CID 149270822.
