= Wang Hebo =

Chinese politician (1882–1927)

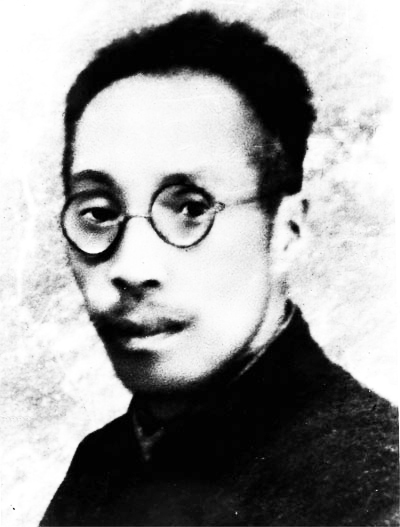
Wang Hebo.

Wang Hebo (Chinese: 王荷波; pinyin: Wáng Hébō) (1882–November 11, 1927) was an official and early leader in the Chinese Communist Party (CCP).

Wang Hebo, whose forebears had come from Taiyuan, Shanxi, was born in Minhou, Fujian, and joined the CCP in June 1922. He led the strike of the Tianjin–Pukou Railway workers in 1923, which effectively supported the General Strike of February 7. Later, he led labor movements in Nanjing, Shanghai, Henan and some other areas. He was one of the leaders of the Third Armed Uprising of Shanghai Workers. He took charge of the revolutionary movements of peasants and workers in the northern provinces as the secretary-general of the Northern Office of the CCP.

He was killed in Beijing on November 11, 1927 by the National Pacification Army government.
