= Cai Hesen =

Early leader of the Chinese Communist Party

- 蔡和森
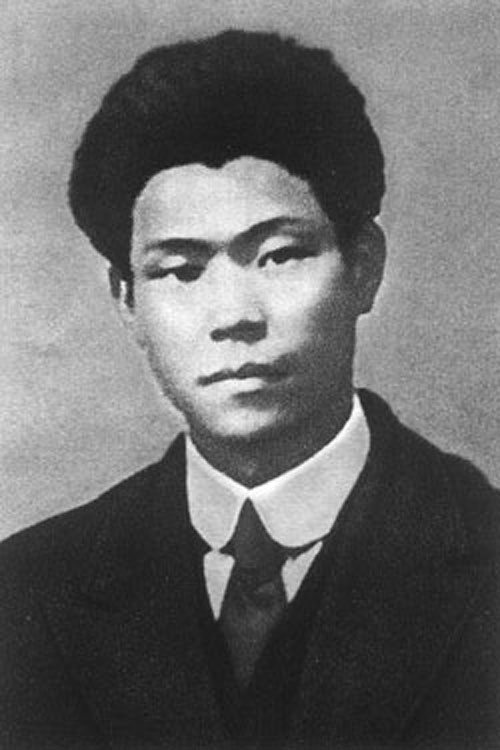
- Cai Hesen in 1931
- Born: March 30, 1895; Shanghai, Qing Empire
- Died: August 4, 1931 (aged 36); Guangzhou, Republic of China
- Cause of death: Executed by the Kuomintang
- Other names: Runhuan; Hexian; Zeying; Lin Bin
- Education: Hunan First Normal University
- Occupation: Communist Revolutionary
- Children: 4

Chinese name
- Simplified Chinese: 蔡和森
- Traditional Chinese: 蔡和森
Transcriptions
Standard Mandarin
- Hanyu Pinyin: Cài Hé Sēn
- Wade–Giles: Ts`ai Ho-sen

Cai Hesen (March 30, 1895 – August 4, 1931) was an early leader of the Chinese Communist Party (CCP), and a friend of Mao Zedong. Cai was born in Shanghai but grew up in Shuangfeng County in Hunan Province of China. He helped Mao organize the Changsha New People's Study Society. In 1919 he went to France on the Work-Study program, and his letters of advocacy were important in convincing Mao of the Bolshevik revolutionary approach. On his return to China, he was an important leader and organizer for the young Communist Party, spent several years in Moscow, and returned to China again in 1931. While organizing revolutionary activity in Hong Kong, he was arrested and given over to Canton authorities, who executed him in August 1931.

== Youth and education ==
Cai's family included both merchants and scholar-officials, but his father had not done well in the family business and instead obtained a job in the Jiangnan Arsenal in Shanghai, where Cai was born, March 30, 1895, the fifth of six children. Cai's mother, left her husband, apparently angered at his taking a "secondary wife." She returned to Hunan in the spring of 1899, taking Cai and his younger sister, Cai Chang (蔡畅), and refusing to live with her husband even when he too returned. The family had little money but Cai found his apprenticeship in his father's business to be unbearable. Cai's mother sold her personal possessions to enable Cai to attend a village school at the age of sixteen. He then studied at Hunan First Normal School and at the Hunan First Normal University in Changsha. Cai studied under Yang Changji, and joined student movements with his fellow student Mao Zedong. In June 1917, he graduated.

In April 1918, Cai, Mao Zedong, and a dozen others organized the New People's Study Society (Xin Min Xue Hui) in Changsha. It was said that "Hesen is the theorist and Mao the realist". Yang Changji had urged his students to stay away from holding public office and to serve society by maintaining independence and moral purity. Cai rejected this Neo-Confucian position. He declared that "what I advocate is to commit wrongs in order to achieve a greater good." When he heard that the anarchists and educators Cai Yuanpei and Li Shizeng had organized a Work-Study Program to send students to France who would finance their study by working in French factories, he and other members of the Society went to Beijing to seek their help.

== In France ==
In 1919, he traveled to France for the Work-Study Program with his mother and his sister Cai Chang (蔡畅). On the ship he met and fell in love with Xiang Jingyu. At a time when "free love," that is, individual choice, was considered indecent, the two discussed political problems and theories, leading to a romantic relationship. In Paris, Cai organized the Work and Study Cooperative Society (Gongxue huzhu she) and advocated Marxist communism. In May 1920, Cai and Xiang Jingyu married. Their marriage became known as the "Xiang Cai Alliance" or the "looking upward alliance" as a model for marriage based on principles of individual freedom and shared revolutionary beliefs.

Cai's conviction that only violent revolution could solve China's problems fractured the Work-Study student group, but Cai was determined to form a Marxist party among his Hunan fellow students. Cai's letters to Mao Zedong, who was then in Beijing, were influential in their advocacy of Bolshevism. Mao replied, "there is not one word with which I do not agree."

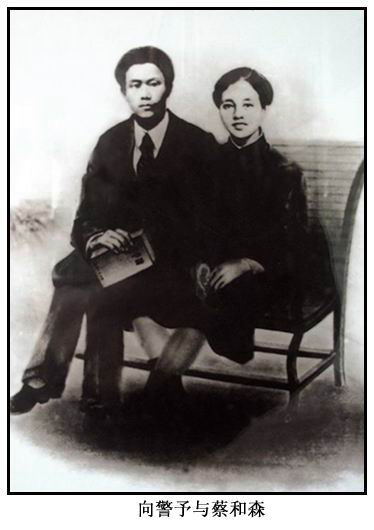
Cai Hesen and wife Xiang Jingyu

In July 1920, Cai and leaders of the New People's Study Society publicly attacked the leaders of the Work-Study Movement for their optimistic anarchist belief in cultural change, education, and communal values. After the Chinese Communist Party was founded, Cai wrote and gained permission to establish an official branch in Europe. In the latter half of 1921, Cai was arrested by the French government for organizing a wave of protests against the Work-Study leadership over admissions to the Sino-French Institute at the University of Lyons, and was deported soon after.

== Revolutionary career ==
Cai and Xiang Jingyu returned to China to work in the Chinese Communist Party's central organization.

The Communist Party during its 2nd National Congress in July 1922 decided to establish an authoritative publication to disseminate its views on anti-imperialism and revolution. This resulted in the founding of The Guide Weekly in Shanghai, the first openly-published newspaper of the central organ of the Communist Party. Cai was the paper's editor.

Cai was a member of the 2nd, 3rd, 4th, 5th, and 6th Central Committees of the Chinese Communist Party, as well as a member of the 5th and 6th Central Political Bureaus and other important positions.

During the May Thirtieth Movement, Cai's brother, Cai Linzheng, was shot and killed while leading a workers' picket team in the Guangzhou-Hong Kong strike.

Cai's work during the May Thirtieth Movement exacerbated his health problems and the Communist Party sent him to Beijing to recuperate.

In October 1925, Cai and Xiang were sent by the Party to Moscow, in part hoping that it would help them reconcile. In 1925, Cai served as the CCP's representative to the international Communist movement in Moscow. While in Moscow, his marriage with Xiang broke up and Cai married Li Yichun (In 1928, Xiang was betrayed to the police of the French concession in Wuhan and executed.) In 1927, Cai returned to China, but went to Moscow again in 1928 to cure disease.

== Death ==
In 1931 Cai returned to Shanghai to support the Guangdong provincial People's Committee. He then went to Hong Kong to direct party work there. He was betrayed by Gu Shunzhang when attending a meeting in Hong Kong, where he was arrested. Cai was extradited to the Chinese authorities in Guangzhou, which was controlled by the warlord Chen Jitang. He was tortured and executed in August 1931, aged 36. The ex-wife of Cai, Xiang Jingyu, was arrested a few years earlier in the Shanghai French Concession in Wuhan on March 20, 1928 due to the betrayal of members of her group to the police. The French officials turned her over to the Kuomintang in April 1928. On May 1 of the same year, Xiang Jingyu was executed by Kuomintang police.

== Family ==
Cai Hesen's father was Cai Rongfeng (蔡蓉峰), and his mother was Ge Jianhao (葛健豪). His first wife was Xiang Jingyu, second wife was Li Yichun (李一纯). His younger sister Cai Chang was the wife of Li Fuchun.

Cai had four children: Cai Ni (蔡妮) and Cai Bo (蔡博) by Xiang Jingyu, and Cai Zhuan (蔡转) and Cai Lin (蔡霖) by Li Yichun.

== See also ==
- Historical Museum of French-Chinese Friendship

== References and further reading ==
- Cai, Hesen (1983). "Lettre De Cai Hesen À Mao Zedong (13 Août 1920)". Extrême-Orient, Extrême-Occident: 143–149.
- Gipoulon, Catherine (1983). "Document I : De Montargis À Pékin, En Quête D'un Plan Pour La Révolution : Une Lettre De Cai Hesen À Mao Zedong (13 Août 1920)". Extrême-Orient, Extrême-Occident. 2 (2): 139–142. doi:10.3406/oroc.1983.890.
- "Ts'ai He-sen," in Klein, Donald W. and Anne B. Clark (1971). Biographic Dictionary of Chinese Communism 1921-1965. Vol 2. Cambridge, Mass.: Harvard University Press. ISBN 0674074106., pp. 851–852.
- Levine, Marilyn Avra (1993). The Found Generation: Chinese Communists in Europe During the Twenties. Seattle: University of Washington Press. ISBN 0295972408.
- Liu, Liyan (2007). "Cai Hesen: A Provincial Scholar Becomes a Young Radical". Twentieth-Century China. 32 (2): 84–110. doi:10.1179/tcc.2007.32.2.84. S2CID 143693034.
- Van de Ven, Hans J. (1991). From Friend to Comrade: The Founding of the Chinese Communist Party, 1920-1927. Berkeley: University of California Press. p. 262. ISBN 0520072715. "Cai Hesen."
