= Members of the 8th Central Committee of the Chinese Communist Party =

The 8th Central Committee of the Chinese Communist Party was elected by the 8th National Congress in 1956. 115 individuals served as members during this electoral term. During this electoral term, the plenary sessions of the 8th Central Committee organised several by-elections.

== Members ==
Members of the 8th Central Committee of the Chinese Communist Party
Ballot	Name		7th CC	9th CC	Birth	PM	Death	Birthplace	Ethnicity	Gender	Ref.
1	Mao Zedong	毛泽东	Member	Member	1893	1921	1976	Hunan	Han	Male	
2	Liu Shaoqi (Note: Liu Shaoqi was expelled from the party by a decision of the 12th Plenary Session of the 8th Central Committee, held on 13–31 October 1968. The session, which adopted the "Report on the Review of the Crimes of the Traitor, Mole, and Worker Thief Liu Shaoqi", condemned him as a "capitalist roader" who was championing an anti-communist line. He was subjected to repression during the Cultural Revolution, imprisoned by state authorities, and died of natural causes on 12 November 1969. The 5th Plenary Session of the 11th Central Committee, held on 23–29 February 1980, rehabilitated Liu with the adoption of the "Resolution on the Rehabilitation of Comrade Liu Shaoqi".)	刘少奇	Member	Expelled	1898	1921	1969	Henan	Han	Male	
3	Lin Boqu (Note: Lin Boqu died of natural causes on 29 May 1960.)	林伯渠	Member	Died	1886	1921	1960	Hunan	Han	Male	
4	Deng Xiaoping	邓小平	Member	Nonmember	1904	1924	1997	Sichuan	Han	Male	
5	Zhu De	朱德	Member	Member	1886	1925	1976	Sichuan	Han	Male	
6	Zhou Enlai	周恩来	Member	Member	1898	1921	1976	Jiangsu	Han	Male	
7	Dong Biwu	董必武	Member	Member	1886	1921	1975	Hubei	Han	Male	
8	Chen Yun	陈云	Member	Member	1905	1925	1995	Shanghai	Han	Male	
9	Lin Biao	林彪	Member	Member	1907	1925	1971	Hubei	Han	Male	
10	Wu Yuzhang (Note: Wu Yuzhang died of natural causes on 12 December 1966.)	吴玉章	Member	Died	1878	1925	1966	Hubei	Han	Male	
11	Chen Boda	陳伯達	Member	Member	1904	1927	1989	Fujian	Han	Male	
12	Cai Chang	蔡畅	Member	Member	1900	1923	1990	Hunan	Han	Female	
13	Li Fuchun	李富春	Member	Member	1900	1923	1975	Hunan	Han	Male	
14	Luo Ronghuan (Note: Luo Ronghuan died of natural causes on 16 December 1963.)	罗荣桓	Member	Died	1902	1927	1963	Hunan	Han	Male	
15	Xu Teli (Note: Xu Teli died of natural causes on 28 November 1968.)	徐特立	Member	Died	1877	1927	1968	Hunan	Han	Male	
16	Lu Dingyi	陆定一	Member	Nonmember	1906	1925	1996	Jiangsu	Han	Male	
17	Luo Ruiqing	罗瑞卿	Alternate	Nonmember	1906	1926	1978	Sichuan	Han	Male	
18	Xu Xiangqian	徐向前	Member	Member	1901	1927	1990	Shanxi	Han	Male	
19	Deng Yingchao	鄧穎超	Member	Member	1904	1924	1992	Guangxi	Han	Female	
20	Liu Bocheng	刘伯承	Member	Member	1892	1926	1986	Sichuan	Han	Male	
21	Chen Yi	陈毅	Member	Member	1901	1923	1972	Sichuan	Han	Male	
22	Peng Dehuai	彭德怀	Member	Nonmember	1898	1928	1974	Hunan	Han	Male	
23	Liao Chengzhi	廖承志	Member	Nonmember	1908	1928	1983	Tokyo	Han	Male	
24	Li Xiannian	李先念	Member	Member	1909	1927	1992	Hubei	Han	Male	
25	Chen Geng (Note: Chen Geng died of natural causes on 16 March 1961.)	陈赓	Alternate	Died	1903	1922	1961	Hunan	Han	Male	
26	Nie Rongzhen	聂荣臻	Member	Member	1899	1923	1992	Sichuan	Han	Male	
27	Lin Feng	林枫	Member	Nonmember	1906	1927	1977	Heilongjiang	Han	Male	
28	Zhang Dingcheng	张鼎丞	Member	Member	1898	1927	1981	Fujian	Han	Male	
29	Peng Zhen	彭真	Member	Nonmember	1902	1923	1997	Shanxi	Han	Male	
30	Ulanhu	乌兰夫	Alternate	Nonmember	1906	1925	1988	Suiyuan	Tümed	Male	
31	Huang Kecheng	黃克誠	Member	Nonmember	1902	1925	1986	Hunan	Han	Male	
32	Teng Daiyuan	滕代远	Member	Member	1904	1925	1974	Hunan	Han	Male	
33	Xiao Jinguang	萧劲光	Alternate	Member	1903	1922	1989	Hunan	Han	Male	
34	Tan Zheng	谭政	Alternate	Nonmember	1906	1927	1988	Hunan	Han	Male	
35	Ke Qingshi (Note: Ke Qingshi died of natural causes on 9 April 1965.)	柯庆施	Nonmember	Died	1902	1922	1965	Anhui	Han	Male	
36	Su Yu	粟裕	Alternate	Member	1907	1927	1984	Hunan	Dong	Male	
37	He Long	贺龙	Member	Nonmember	1896	1927	1969	Hunan	Han	Male	
38	Wang Shoudao	王首道	Member	Member	1906	1926	1996	Hunan	Han	Male	
39	Wang Weizhou	王维舟	Alternate	Nonmember	1887	1927	1970	Sichuan	Han	Male	
40	Deng Zihui	邓子恢	Member	Member	1896	1925	1972	Fujian	Han	Male	
41	Li Kenong (Note: Li Kenong died of natural causes on 9 February 1962.)	李克农	Nonmember	Died	1899	1926	1962	Anhui	Han	Male	
42	Yang Shangkun	杨尚昆	Comeback	Nonmember	1907	1926	1998	Chongqing	Han	Male	
43	Ye Jianying	叶剑英	Member	Member	1897	1927	1986	Guangdong	Han	Male	
44	Song Renqiong	宋任穷	Alternate	Nonmember	1909	1926	2005	Hunan	Han	Male	
45	Zhang Yunyi	张云逸	Member	Member	1892	1926	1974	Guangdong	Han	Male	
46	Liu Xiao	刘晓	Alternate	Nonmember	1908	1926	1988	Hunan	Han	Male	
47	Li Weihan	李维汉	Comeback	Nonmember	1896	1923	1984	Hunan	Han	Male	
48	Wang Jiaxiang	王稼祥	Member	Nonmember	1906	1928	1974	Anhui	Han	Male	
49	Kang Sheng	康生	Member	Member	1898	1925	1975	Shandong	Han	Male	
50	Ye Jizhuang (Note: Ye Jizhuang was repressed during the Cultural Revolution, but died of natural causes on 27 June 1967.)	叶季壮	Nonmember	Died	1893	1925	1967	Guangdong	Han	Male	
51	Liu Lantao	刘澜涛	Alternate	Nonmember	1910	1928	1997	Liaoning	Han	Male	
52	Liu Ningyi	刘宁一	Nonmember	Nonmember	1907	1925	1994	Hebei	Han	Male	
53	Bo Yibo	薄一波	Member	Nonmember	1908	1925	2007	Shanxi	Han	Male	
54	Hu Qiaomu	胡乔木	Nonmember	Nonmember	1912	1932	1992	Jiangsu	Han	Male	
55	Yang Xiufeng	杨秀峰	Nonmember	Nonmember	1897	1930	1983	Hebei	Han	Male	
56	Shu Tong	舒同	Nonmember	Nonmember	1905	1926	1998	Jiangxi	Han	Male	
57	Lai Ruoyu (Note: Lai Ruoyu died of natural causes on 20 May 1958.)	赖若愚	Nonmember	Died	1910	1929	1958	Shanxi	Han	Male	
58	Zhang Jichun (Note: Zhang Jichun died of natural causes on 12 September 1968.)	张际春	Alternate	Died	1900	1926	1968	Hunan	Han	Male	
59	Cheng Zihua	程子华	Alternate	Nonmember	1905	1926	1991	Shanxi	Han	Male	
60	Chen Yu	陈郁	Alternate	Member	1901	1925	1974	Guangdong	Han	Male	
61	Liu Changsheng (Note: Liu Changsheng was repressed during the Cultural Revolution, and died of natural causes on 20 January 1967.)	刘长胜	Alternate	Died	1903	1927	1967	Shandong	Han	Male	
62	Wu Xiuquan	伍修权	Nonmember	Nonmember	1908	1931	1997	Hubei	Han	Male	
63	Xiao Ke	萧克	Nonmember	Nonmember	1907	1927	2008	Hunan	Han	Male	
64	Qian Ying	钱瑛	Nonmember	Nonmember	1903	1927	1973	Hubei	Han	Female	
65	Wang Congwu	王从吾	Alternate	Nonmember	1910	1927	2001	Henan	Han	Male	
66	Deng Hua	邓华	Nonmember	Alternate	1910	1927	1980	Hunan	Han	Male	
67	Ma Mingfang	马明方	Alternate	Nonmember	1905	1925	1974	Shaanxi	Han	Male	
68	Zhang Wentian	张闻天	Member	Nonmember	1900	1925	1976	Shanghai	Han	Male	
69	Tan Zhenlin	谭震林	Member	Nonmember	1902	1926	1983	Hunan	Han	Male	
70	Liu Yalou (Note: Liu Yalou died of natural causes on 7 May 1965.)	刘亚楼	Nonmember	Died	1910	1929	1965	Fujian	Han	Male	
71	Li Xuefeng	李雪峰	Nonmember	Nonmember	1907	1933	2003	Shanxi	Han	Male	
72	Chen Shaomin (Note: Chen Shaomin was removed as a member for not voting in support of the resolution that expelled Liu Shaoqi from the party at the 12th Plenary Session of the 8th Central Committee, held on 13–31 October 1968.)	陈少敏	Member	Removed	1902	1928	1977	Shandong	Han	Female	
73	Li Baohua	李葆华	Alternate	Nonmember	1909	1931	2005	Hebei	Han	Male	
74	Xu Guangda	许光达	Nonmember	Nonmember	1908	1925	1969	Hunan	Han	Male	
75	Wang Zhen	王震	Alternate	Member	1908	1927	1993	Hunan	Han	Male	
76	Zeng Shan	曾山	Member	Member	1899	1926	1972	Jiangxi	Han	Male	
77	Lin Tie	林铁	Nonmember	Nonmember	1904	1926	1989	Chongqing	Han	Male	
78	Zheng Weisan	郑位三	Member	Nonmember	1902	1925	1975	Hubei	Han	Male	
79	Xu Haidong	徐海东	Nonmember	Member	1900	1925	1970	Hubei	Han	Male	
80	Xiao Hua	萧华	Nonmember	Nonmember	1916	1930	1985	Jiangxi	Han	Male	
81	Hu Yaobang	胡耀邦	Nonmember	Nonmember	1915	1929	1989	Hunan	Han	Male	
82	Zhao Erlu (Note: Zhao Erlu died of natural causes on 2 February 1967.)	赵尔陆	Nonmember	Died	1905	1927	1967	Shanxi	Han	Male	
83	Ouyang Qin	欧阳钦	Nonmember	Nonmember	1900	1924	1978	Hunan	Han	Male	
84	Xi Zhongxun	习仲勋	Alternate	Nonmember	1913	1928	2002	Shaanxi	Han	Male	
85	Liu Geping	刘格平	Nonmember	Member	1904	1926	1992	Hebei	Hui	Male	
86	Xie Fuzhi	谢富治	Nonmember	Member	1909	1931	1972	Hubei	Han	Male	
87	An Ziwen	安子文	Nonmember	Nonmember	1909	1927	1980	Shaanxi	Han	Male	
88	Jia Tuofu (Note: Jia Tuofu was accused of being a member of an anti-party clique and a rightist, and was as a result repressed during the Cultural Revolution. He was found dead on 7 May 1967.)	贾拓夫	Nonmember	Killed	1912	1928	1967	Shaanxi	Han	Male	
89	Li Lisan (Note: Li Lisan was repressed during the Cultural Revolution and committed suicide on 20 March 1980. He was rehabilitated in 1980.)	李立三	Member	Suicide	1899	1921	1967	Hunan	Han	Male	
90	Huang Jing (Note: Huang Jing committed suicide on 10 February 1958 after being accused of being a rightist during the Anti-Rightist Campaign.)	黄敬	Nonmember	Suicide	1912	1932	1958	Zhejiang	Han	Male	
91	Li Jingquan	李井泉	Nonmember	Nonmember	1909	1930	1989	Jiangxi	Han	Male	
92	Wu Zhipu (Note: Wu Zhipu died of natural causes on 19 October 1967.)	吴芝圃	Nonmember	Died	1906	1925	1967	Henan	Han	Male	
93	Lü Zhengcao	吕正操	Alternate	Nonmember	1905	1937	2009	Liaoning	Han	Male	
94	Wang Shusheng	王树声	Nonmember	Member	1905	1926	1974	Hubei	Han	Male	
95	Tao Zhu	陶铸	Nonmember	Nonmember	1908	1926	1969	Hunan	Han	Male	
96	Zeng Xisheng (Note: Zeng Xisheng was repressed during the Cultural Revolution. He died of natural causes on 15 July 1968.)	曾希圣	Nonmember	Died	1904	1927	1968	Hunan	Han	Male	
97	Wang Ming	陈绍禹	Member	Nonmember	1904	1925	1974	Anhui	Han	Male	
98	Yang Xianzhen (Note: Yang Xianzhen was elected as an alternate by the 8th National Congress in 1956. He was by-elected to member-status at the 5th Plenary Session of the 8th Central Committee, held on 25 May 1958.)	杨献珍	By-elected	Nonmember	1896	1926	1992	Hubei	Han	Male	
99	Wang Enmao (Note: Wang Enmao was elected as an alternate by the 8th National Congress in 1956. He was by-elected to member-status at the 5th Plenary Session of the 8th Central Committee, held on 25 May 1958.)	王恩茂	By-elected	Alternate	1913	1930	2001	Jiangxi	Han	Male	
100	Yang Dezhi (Note: Yang Dezhi was elected as an alternate by the 8th National Congress in 1956. He was by-elected to member-status at the 11th Plenary Session of the 8th Central Committee, held on 1–12 August 1966.)	楊得志	By-elected	Member	1911	1928	1994	Hunan	Han	Male	
101	Wei Guoqing (Note: Wei Guoqing was elected as an alternate by the 8th National Congress in 1956. He was by-elected to member-status at the 11th Plenary Session of the 8th Central Committee, held on 1–12 August 1966.)	韦国清	By-elected	Member	1913	1931	1989	Guangxi	Zhuang	Male	
102	Luo Guibo (Note: Luo Guibo was elected as an alternate by the 8th National Congress in 1956. He was by-elected to member-status at the 11th Plenary Session of the 8th Central Committee, held on 1–12 August 1966.)	罗贵波	By-elected	Nonmember	1907	1927	1995	Jiangxi	Han	Male	
103	Zhang Jingwu (Note: Zhang Jingwu was elected as an alternate by the 8th National Congress in 1956. He was by-elected to member-status at the 11th Plenary Session of the 8th Central Committee, held on 1–12 August 1966.)	张经武	By-elected	Nonmember	1906	1930	1971	Hunan	Han	Male	
104	Xie Juezai (Note: Xie Juezai was elected as an alternate by the 8th National Congress in 1956. He was by-elected to member-status at the 11th Plenary Session of the 8th Central Committee, held on 1–12 August 1966.)	谢觉哉	By-elected	Nonmember	1884	1925	1971	Hunan	Han	Male	
105	Ye Fei (Note: Ye Fei was elected as an alternate by the 8th National Congress in 1956. He was by-elected to member-status at the 11th Plenary Session of the 8th Central Committee, held on 1–12 August 1966.)	叶飞	By-elected	Nonmember	1914	1932	1999	Philippines	Han	Male	
106	Huang Yongsheng (Note: Huang Yongsheng was elected as an alternate by the 8th National Congress in 1956. He was by-elected to member-status at the 12th Plenary Session of the 8th Central Committee, held on 13–31 October 1968.)	黄永胜	By-elected	Member	1910	1927	1983	Hubei	Han	Male	
107	Xu Shiyou (Note: Xu Shiyou was elected as an alternate by the 8th National Congress in 1956. He was by-elected to member-status at the 12th Plenary Session of the 8th Central Committee, held on 13–31 October 1968.)	许世友	By-elected	Member	1905	1927	1985	Henan	Han	Male	
108	Chen Xilian (Note: Chen Xilian was elected as an alternate by the 8th National Congress in 1956. He was by-elected to member-status at the 12th Plenary Session of the 8th Central Committee, held on 13–31 October 1968.)	陈锡联	By-elected	Member	1915	1930	1999	Hubei	Han	Male	
109	Zhang Dazhi (Note: Zhang Dazhi was elected as an alternate by the 8th National Congress in 1956. He was by-elected to member-status at the 12th Plenary Session of the 8th Central Committee, held on 13–31 October 1968.)	张达志	By-elected	Member	1911	1929	1992	Shaanxi	Han	Male	
110	Han Xianchu (Note: Han Xianchu was elected as an alternate by the 8th National Congress in 1956. He was by-elected to member-status at the 12th Plenary Session of the 8th Central Committee, held on 13–31 October 1968.)	韩先楚	By-elected	Member	1913	1930	1986	Hubei	Han	Male	
111	Pan Fusheng (Note: Pan Fusheng was elected as an alternate by the 8th National Congress in 1956. He was by-elected to member-status at the 12th Plenary Session of the 8th Central Committee, held on 13–31 October 1968.)	潘復生	By-elected	Member	1908	1931	1980	Shandong	Han	Male	
112	Liu Jianxun (Note: Liu Jianxun was elected as an alternate by the 8th National Congress in 1956. He was by-elected to member-status at the 12th Plenary Session of the 8th Central Committee, held on 13–31 October 1968.)	刘建勋	By-elected	Member	1913	1931	1983	Hebei	Han	Male	
113	Liu Zihou (Note: Liu Zihou was elected as an alternate by the 8th National Congress in 1956. He was by-elected to member-status at the 12th Plenary Session of the 8th Central Committee, held on 13–31 October 1968.)	刘子厚	By-elected	Member	1911	1929	2001	Hebei	Han	Male	
114	Wu De (Note: Wu De was elected as an alternate by the 8th National Congress in 1956. He was by-elected to member-status at the 12th Plenary Session of the 8th Central Committee, held on 13–31 October 1968.)	吴德	By-elected	Member	1913	1933	1995	Hebei	Han	Male	
115	Li Dazhang (Note: Li Dazhang was elected as an alternate by the 8th National Congress in 1956. He was by-elected to member-status at the 12th Plenary Session of the 8th Central Committee, held on 13–31 October 1968.)	李大章	By-elected	Member	1900	1924	1976	Sichuan	Han	Male	
