= Alternates of the 7th Central Committee of the Chinese Communist Party =

The 7th Central Committee of the Chinese Communist Party was elected by the 7th National Congress in 1945. 33 individuals served as alternates during this electoral term. During this electoral term, the plenary sessions of the 7th Central Committee removed one alternate and by-elected seven to member-status.

== Composition ==
Alternates of the 7th Central Committee of the Chinese Communist Party
Ballot	Name		6th CC	8th CC	Birth	PM	Death	Birthplace	Ethnicity	Gender	Ref.
1	Liao Chengzhi (Note: Liao Chengzhi was by-elected to member-status at the 2nd Plenary Session of the 7th Central Committee, held on 5–13 March 1949.)	廖承志	Nonmember	By-elected	1908	1928	1983	Tokyo	Han	Male	
2	Wang Jiaxiang (Note: Wang Jiaxiang was by-elected to member-status at the 2nd Plenary Session of the 7th Central Committee, held on 5–13 March 1949.)	王稼祥	Member	By-elected	1906	1928	1974	Anhui	Han	Male	
3	Chen Boda (Note: Chen Boda was by-elected to member-status at the 2nd Plenary Session of the 7th Central Committee, held on 5–13 March 1949.)	陈伯达	Nonmember	By-elected	1904	1927	1989	Fujian	Han	Male	
4	Huang Kecheng (Note: Huang Kecheng was by-elected to member-status at the 2nd Plenary Session of the 7th Central Committee, held on 5–13 March 1949.)	黄克诚	Nonmember	By-elected	1902	1925	1986	Hunan	Han	Male	
5	Wang Shoudao (Note: Wang Shoudao was by-elected to member-status at the 7th Plenary Session of the 7th Central Committee, held on 22 August – 13 September 1956.)	王首道	Nonmember	By-elected	1906	1926	1996	Hunan	Han	Male	
6	Li Yu (Note: Li Yu was removed as an alternate at the 3rd Plenary Session of the 7th Central Committee, held on 6–9 June 1950.)	黎玉	Nonmember	Removed	1906	1926	1986	Shanxi	Han	Male	
7	Deng Yingchao (Note: Deng Yingchao was by-elected to member-status at the 7th Plenary Session of the 7th Central Committee, held on 22 August – 13 September 1956.)	邓颖超	Nonmember	By-elected	1904	1924	1992	Guangxi	Han	Female	
8	Chen Shaomin (Note: Chen Shaomin was by-elected to member-status at the 7th Plenary Session of the 7th Central Committee, held on 22 August – 13 September 1956.)	陈少敏	Nonmember	By-elected	1902	1928	1977	Shandong	Han	Female	
9	Liu Xiao	刘晓	Nonmember	Member	1908	1926	1988	Hunan	Han	Male	
10	Tan Zheng	谭政	Nonmember	Member	1906	1927	1988	Hunan	Han	Male	
11	Cheng Zihua	程子华	Nonmember	Member	1905	1926	1991	Shanxi	Han	Male	
12	Liu Changsheng	刘长胜	Nonmember	Member	1903	1927	1967	Shandong	Han	Male	
13	Su Yu	粟裕	Nonmember	Member	1907	1927	1984	Hunan	Dong	Male	
14	Wang Zhen	王震	Nonmember	Member	1908	1927	1993	Hunan	Han	Male	
15	Song Renqiong	宋任穷	Nonmember	Member	1909	1926	2005	Hunan	Han	Male	
16	Zhang Jichun	张际春	Nonmember	Member	1900	1926	1968	Hunan	Han	Male	
17	Ulanhu	乌兰夫	Nonmember	Member	1906	1925	1988	Suiyuan	Tümed	Male	
18	Li Baohua	李葆华	Nonmember	Member	1909	1931	2005	Hebei	Han	Male	
19	Wang Weizhou	王维舟	Nonmember	Member	1887	1927	1970	Sichuan	Han	Male	
20	Wan Yi	万毅	Nonmember	Alternate	1907	1938	1997	Liaoning	Manchu	Male	
21	Gu Dacun	古大存	Nonmember	Alternate	1896	1924	1966	Guangdong	Han	Male	
22	Zeng Jingbing	曾镜冰	Nonmember	Nonmember	1912	1931	1967	Hainan	Han	Male	
23	Chen Yu	陈郁	Member	Member	1901	1925	1974	Guangdong	Han	Male	
24	Ma Mingfang	马明方	Nonmember	Member	1905	1925	1974	Shaanxi	Han	Male	
25	Lü Zhengcao	吕正操	Nonmember	Member	1905	1937	2009	Liaoning	Han	Male	
26	Luo Ruiqing	罗瑞卿	Nonmember	Member	1906	1926	1978	Sichuan	Han	Male	
27	Liu Zijiu	刘子久	Nonmember	Nonmember	1901	1924	1988	Shandong	Han	Male	
28	Zhang Zongxun	张宗逊	Nonmember	Nonmember	1908	1926	1998	Shaanxi	Han	Male	
29	Chen Geng	陈赓	Nonmember	Member	1903	1922	1961	Hunan	Han	Male	
30	Wang Congwu	王从吾	Nonmember	Member	1910	1927	2001	Henan	Han	Male	
31	Xi Zhongxun	习仲勋	Nonmember	Member	1913	1928	2002	Shaanxi	Han	Male	
32	Xiao Jinguang	肖劲光	Nonmember	Member	1903	1922	1989	Hunan	Han	Male	
33	Liu Lantao	刘澜涛	Nonmember	Member	1910	1928	1997	Liaoning	Han	Male	
