= Alternates of the 6th Central Committee of the Chinese Communist Party =

The 6th Central Committee of the Chinese Communist Party was elected by the 6th National Congress in 1928. 34 individuals served as alternates during this electoral term. During this electoral term, the plenary sessions of the 6th Central Committee and sessions of the 6th Politburo organised several by-elections.

== Composition ==
Alternates of the 6th Central Committee of the Chinese Communist Party
Name		5th CC	7th CC	Birth	PM	Death	Birthplace	Ethnicity	Gender	Ref.
Chen Tanqiu (Note: Chen Tanqiu was by-elected as an alternate at the 3rd Plenary Session of the 6th Central Committee in September 1930. He was executed on 27 September 1943 on the orders of Sheng Shicai, a Xinjiang warlord.)	陳潭秋	Alternate	Member	1896	1921	1943	Hubei	Han	Male	
Chen Yun (Note: Chen Yun was by-elected as an alternate at the 3rd Plenary Session of the 6th Central Committee in September 1930. He was promoted to member at the 4th Plenary Session in January 1931.)	陈云	Nonmember	Nonmember	1905	1925	1995	Shanghai	Han	Male	
Deng Zhongxia (Note: Deng Zhongxia was arrested in May and executed by state authorities on 21 September 1933.)	邓中夏	Member	Nonmember	1894	1921	1933	Hunan	Han	Male	
Fu Zhong (Note: Fu Zhong was by-elected by a decision of the 6th Politburo in August 1935. Despite his by-election, he never attended a Central Committee plenary session as an alternate, and by the convocation of the 7th National Congress, held in 1945, he no longer served as an alternate.)	傅钟	Nonmember	Nonmember	1900	1921	1989	Sichuan	Han	Male	
Gan Zhuotang (Note: Gan Zhuotang was arrested and executed by state authorities in February 1929.)	甘卓棠	Nonmember	Nonmember	1899	1926	1929	Guangdong	Han	Male	
He Wei (Note: He Wei was by-elected by a decision of the 6th Politburo in August 1935. Despite his by-election, he never attended a Central Committee plenary session as an alternate. He Wei defected to the Kuomintang at the outbreak of the Second Sino-Japanese War in 1937.)	何畏	Nonmember	Nonmember	?	?	1949	Guangxi	Unknown	Male	
Huang Ping (Note: Huang Ping was by-elected as an alternate by the 3rd Plenary Session of the 6th Central Committee in September 1930. In January 1933, Huang Ping surrendered and defected to the Kuomintang.)	黄平	Alternate	Nonmember	1901	1924	1981	Hubei	Han	Male	
Kong Yuan (Note: Kong Yuan was by-elected by the 5th Plenary Session of the 6th Central Committee in January 1934.)	孔原	Nonmember	Nonmember	1906	1925	1990	Jiangxi	Han	Male	
Li Fuchun (Note: Li Fuchun was by-elected by the 5th Plenary Session of the 6th Central Committee in January 1934.)	李富春	Nonmember	Member	1900	1923	1975	Hunan	Han	Male	
Li Weihan (Note: Li Weihan was by-elected by the 5th Plenary Session of the 6th Central Committee in January 1934. He was promoted to member-status by a decision of the 6th Politburo in January 1935.)	李维汉	Nonmember	Nonmember	1896	1921	1984	Hunan	Han	Male	
Li Xiannian (Note: Li Xiannian was by-elected by a decision of the 6th Politburo in August 1935. Despite his by-election, he never attended a Central Committee plenary session as an alternate, and at the end of the 7th Plenary Session of the 6th Central Committee, held in 1944–1945, he was promoted to member-status.)	李先念	Nonmember	Nonmember	1909	1927	1992	Hubei	Han	Male	
Li Zhusheng (Note: Li Zhusheng was by-elected by the 6th Politburo in September 1931. State authorities arrested him in June 1934, and he shortly after defected to the Kuomintang.)	李竹声	Nonmember	Nonmember	1903	1925	1951	Anhui	Han	Male	
Li Zifen (Note: Li Zifen was arrested by state authorities in August 1932, and died in prison in December 1935.)	李子芬	Nonmember	Nonmember	1902	1923	1935	Hubei	Han	Male	
Lin Yuying (Note: Lin Yuying was given member-status by a decision of the 6th Plenary Session of the 6th Central Committee in November 1938.)	林育英	Nonmember	Nonmember	1897	1922	1942	Hubei	Han	Male	
Liu Jianyu (Note: Liu Jianyu was arrested by state authorities on 5 May and executed on 7 May 1930.)	刘坚予	Nonmember	Nonmember	1895	1925	1930	Shaanxi	Han	Male	
Luo Zhanglong (Note: Luo Zhanglong was expelled by the decision of the 6th Politburo, titled "Resolution on Expelling Luo Zhanglong from the Central Committee and the Party", in January 1931-elected by the 6th Plenary Session of the 6th Central Committee in November 1938.)	罗章龙	Member	Nonmember	1896	1921	1995	Hunan	Han	Male	
Peng Dehuai (Note: Peng Dehuai was by-elected by the 5th Plenary Session of the 6th Central Committee in January 1934. He was promoted to member-status by a decision of the 6th Politburo in 1936.)	彭德怀	Nonmember	Nonmember	1898	1928	1974	Hunan	Han	Male	
Shen Zemin (Note: Shen Zemin was by-elected as an alternate at the 4th Plenary Session of the 6th Central Committee in January 1931. He died of natural causes on 20 November 1933.)	沈泽民	Nonmember	Nonmember	1900	1921	1933	Zhejiang	Han	Male	
Shi Wenbin (Note: Shi Wenbin was removed from the Central Committee as an alternate and expelled from the party by a decision of the 6th Politburo in July 1931.)	史文彬	Nonmember	Nonmember	1887	1921	1942	Shandong	Han	Male	
Tang Hongjing (Note: Wang Zhuo was promoted to member-status by a decision of the 6th Politburo in November 1928.)	唐宏经	Nonmember	Nonmember	1901	1926	2005	Liaoning	Han	Male	
Wang Fengfei (Note: Wang Fengfei was promoted to member-status by a decision of the 6th Politburo in November 1928.)	王凤飞	Nonmember	Nonmember	1903	1926	1933	Jiangxi	Han	Male	
Wang Kequan (Note: Wang Kequan was by-elected as an alternate at the 3rd Plenary Session of the 6th Central Committee in September 1930. He was given member-status by a decision of the 4th Plenary Session of the 6th Central Committee in January 1931.)	王克全	Nonmember	Nonmember	1906	1924	1939	Anhui	Han	Male	
Wang Yinren (Note: Wang Yinren was by-elected as an alternate at the 3rd Plenary Session of the 6th Central Committee in September 1930. He was arrested by state authorities in 1933, and upon being released from prison, he returned to his hometown to farm.)	王荩仁	Nonmember	Nonmember	1901	1926	1981	Shandong	Han	Male	
Wang Zhongyi (Note: Wang Zhongyi was promoted to member-status by a decision of the 6th Politburo in November 1928.)	王仲一	Nonmember	Nonmember	1901	1921	1931	Shanxi	Han	Male	
Wang Zhuo (Note: Wang Zhuo was promoted to member-status by a decision of the 6th Politburo in November 1928.)	王灼	Nonmember	Nonmember	1898	1926	1932	Guangdong	Han	Male	
Xia Wenfa (Note: Xia Wenfa was arrested by state authorities in March and executed on 4 April 1929.)	夏文法	Nonmember	Nonmember	?	1926	1929	Hubei	Han	Male	
Xia Xi (Note: Xia Xi was by-elected as an alternate at the 4th Plenary Session of the 6th Central Committee in January 1931. He drowned while crossing a river in Guizhou on 28 February 1936.)	夏曦	Nonmember	Nonmember	1901	1921	1936	Hunan	Han	Male	
Xu Lanzhi (Note: Xu Lanzhi was promoted to member-status by a decision of the 6th Politburo in November 1928.)	徐兰芝	Nonmember	Nonmember	?	?	1931	Henan	Han	Female	
Yang Shangkun (Note: Yang Shangkun was by-elected by the 5th Plenary Session of the 6th Central Committee in January 1934.)	杨尚昆	Nonmember	Nonmember	1907	1926	1998	Chongqing	Han	Male	
Yuan Binghui (Note: Yuan Binghui was arrested by state authorities in October 1932 and defected to the Kuomintang later that year. His whereabouts since are unknown.)	袁炳輝	Nonmember	Nonmember	?	1926	1932	Guangdong	Han	Male	
Yun Daiying (Note: Yun Daiying was arrested in February 1930 and executed by state authorities on 29 April 1931.)	恬代英	Member	Nonmember	1895	1921	1931	Hubei	Han	Male	
Zeng Bingchun (Note: Zeng Bingchun was by-elected as an alternate at the 4th Plenary Session of the 6th Central Committee in January 1931. He was killed in a counter-revolutionary uprising in Jiangxi on 30 February 1932..)	曾炳春	Nonmember	Nonmember	1902	1927	1932	Jiangxi	Han	Male	
Zhou Xiuzhu (Note: Zhou Xiuzhu served as an alternate member until January 1931 when she was appointed head of the Women's Department of the Party Central Committee.)	周秀珠	Nonmember	Nonmember	1910	1926	1970	Guangdong	Han	Female	
Zhu De (Note: Zhu De was by-elected as an alternate at the 3rd Plenary Session of the 6th Central Committee in September 1930. In January 1934, he was given member-status by a decision of the 5th Plenary Session of the 6th Central Committee.)	朱德	Nonmember	Nonmember	1886	1925	1976	Sichuan	Han	Male	

== See also ==
- Members of the 6th Central Committee of the Chinese Communist Party

== Bibliography ==
- Organisation Department and the Party History Research Center (2004). 中国共产党历届中央委员大辞典, 1921-2003 [Dictionary of the Members of the Central Committee of the Communist Party of China, 1921–2003] (in Simplified Chinese). Central Literature Publishing House. ISBN 9787801369529.
- Shen, Xueming; Zheng, Jianying (2001). 中共第一届至十五届中央委员 [Member of the 1st to 15th Central Committee of the Communist Party of China] (in Simplified Chinese). Central Literature Publishing House. ISBN 9787507310344.
