= Members of the 7th Central Committee of the Chinese Communist Party =

The 7th Central Committee of the Chinese Communist Party was elected by the 7th National Congress in 1945. 51 individuals served as members during this electoral term. During this electoral term, the plenary sessions of the 7th Central Committee organised several by-elections.

== Members ==
Members of the 7th Central Committee of the Chinese Communist Party
Ballot	Name		6th CC	8th CC	Birth	PM	Death	Birthplace	Ethnicity	Gender	Ref.
1	Mao Zedong	毛泽东	Member	Member	1893	1921	1976	Hunan	Han	Male	
2	Zhu De	朱德	Member	Member	1886	1925	1976	Sichuan	Han	Male	
3	Liu Shaoqi	刘少奇	Member	Member	1898	1921	1969	Henan	Han	Male	
4	Ren Bishi	任弼时	Member	Nonmember	1904	1922	1950	Hunan	Han	Male	
5	Lin Boqu	林伯渠	Member	Member	1886	1921	1960	Hunan	Han	Male	
6	Lin Biao	林彪	Nonmember	Member	1907	1925	1971	Hubei	Han	Male	
7	Dong Biwu	董必武	Member	Member	1886	1921	1975	Hubei	Han	Male	
8	Chen Yun	陈云	Member	Member	1905	1925	1995	Shanghai	Han	Male	
9	Xu Xiangqian	徐向前	Member	Member	1901	1927	1990	Shanxi	Han	Male	
10	Guan Xiangying	关向应	Member	Nonmember	1902	1925	1946	Liaoning	Manchu	Male	
11	Chen Tanqiu (Note: Chen Tanqiu was executed on 27 September 1943 at the orders of Sheng Shicai, a Xinjiang warlord. The party was not aware of his death, and he was elected to the 7th Central Committee.)	陳潭秋	Alternate	Nonmember	1896	1921	1943	Hubei	Han	Male	
12	Gao Gang	高岗	Nonmember	Nonmember	1905	1926	1954	Shaanxi	Han	Male	
13	Li Fuchun	李富春	Alternate	Member	1900	1923	1975	Hunan	Han	Male	
14	Rao Shushi	饶漱石	Nonmember	Nonmember	1903	1925	1975	Jiangxi	Han	Male	
15	Li Lisan	李立三	Member	Member	1899	1921	1967	Hunan	Han	Male	
16	Luo Ronghuan	罗荣桓	Nonmember	Member	1902	1927	1963	Hunan	Han	Male	
17	Kang Sheng	康生	Member	Member	1898	1925	1975	Shandong	Han	Male	
18	Peng Zhen	彭真	Nonmember	Member	1902	1923	1997	Shanxi	Han	Male	
19	Wang Ruofei	王若飞	Nonmember	Nonmember	1896	1923	1946	Guizhou	Han	Male	
20	Zhang Yunyi	张云逸	Nonmember	Member	1892	1926	1974	Guangdong	Han	Male	
21	He Long	贺龙	Nonmember	Member	1896	1927	1969	Hunan	Han	Male	
22	Chen Yi	陈毅	Nonmember	Member	1901	1923	1972	Sichuan	Han	Male	
23	Zhou Enlai	周恩来	Member	Member	1898	1921	1976	Jiangsu	Han	Male	
24	Liu Bocheng	刘伯承	Nonmember	Member	1892	1926	1986	Sichuan	Han	Male	
25	Zheng Weisan	郑位三	Nonmember	Member	1902	1925	1975	Hubei	Han	Male	
26	Zhang Wentian	张闻天	Member	Member	1900	1925	1976	Shanghai	Han	Male	
27	Cai Chang	蔡畅	Nonmember	Member	1900	1923	1990	Hunan	Han	Female	
28	Deng Xiaoping	邓小平	Nonmember	Member	1904	1924	1997	Sichuan	Han	Male	
29	Lu Dingyi	陆定一	Nonmember	Member	1906	1925	1996	Jiangsu	Han	Male	
30	Zeng Shan	曾山	Nonmember	Member	1899	1926	1972	Jiangxi	Han	Male	
31	Ye Jianying	叶剑英	Nonmember	Member	1897	1927	1986	Guangdong	Han	Male	
32	Nie Rongzhen	聂荣臻	Nonmember	Member	1899	1923	1992	Sichuan	Han	Male	
33	Peng Dehuai	彭德怀	Member	Member	1898	1928	1974	Hunan	Han	Male	
34	Deng Zihui	邓子恢	Nonmember	Member	1896	1925	1972	Fujian	Han	Male	
35	Wu Yuzhang	吴玉章	Member	Member	1878	1925	1966	Hubei	Han	Male	
36	Lin Feng	林枫	Nonmember	Member	1906	1927	1977	Heilongjiang	Han	Male	
37	Teng Daiyuan	滕代远	Nonmember	Member	1904	1925	1974	Hunan	Han	Male	
38	Zhang Dingcheng	张鼎丞	Nonmember	Member	1898	1927	1981	Fujian	Han	Male	
39	Li Xiannian	李先念	Member	Member	1909	1927	1992	Hubei	Han	Male	
40	Xu Teli	徐特立	Nonmember	Member	1877	1927	1968	Hunan	Han	Male	
41	Tan Zhenlin	谭震林	Nonmember	Member	1902	1926	1983	Hunan	Han	Male	
42	Bo Yibo	薄一波	Nonmember	Member	1908	1925	2007	Shanxi	Han	Male	
43	Wang Ming	王明	Member	Member	1904	1925	1974	Anhui	Han	Male	
44	Bo Gu	博古	Member	Nonmember	1907	1925	1946	Jiangsu	Han	Male	
45	Liao Chengzhi (Note: Liao Chengzhi was elected as an alternate by the 7th National Congress in 1945. He was by-elected to member-status at the 2nd Plenary Session of the 7th Central Committee, held on 5–13 March 1949.)	廖承志	By-elected	Member	1908	1928	1983	Tokyo	Han	Male	
46	Wang Jiaxiang (Note: Wang Jiaxiang was elected as an alternate by the 7th National Congress in 1945. He was by-elected to member-status at the 2nd Plenary Session of the 7th Central Committee, held on 5–13 March 1949.)	王稼祥	By-elected	Member	1906	1928	1974	Anhui	Han	Male	
47	Chen Boda (Note: Chen Boda was elected as an alternate by the 7th National Congress in 1945. He was by-elected to member-status at the 2nd Plenary Session of the 7th Central Committee, held on 5–13 March 1949.)	陈伯达	By-elected	Member	1904	1927	1989	Fujian	Han	Male	
48	Huang Kecheng (Note: Huang Kecheng was elected as an alternate by the 7th National Congress in 1945. He was by-elected to member-status at the 2nd Plenary Session of the 7th Central Committee, held on 5–13 March 1949.)	黄克诚	By-elected	Member	1902	1925	1986	Hunan	Han	Male	
49	Wang Shoudao (Note: Wang Shoudao was elected as an alternate by the 7th National Congress in 1945. He was by-elected to member-status at the 7th Plenary Session of the 7th Central Committee, held on 22 August – 13 September 1956.)	王首道	By-elected	Member	1906	1926	1996	Hunan	Han	Male	
50	Deng Yingchao (Note: Deng Yingchao was elected as an alternate by the 7th National Congress in 1945. She was by-elected to member-status at the 7th Plenary Session of the 7th Central Committee, held on 22 August – 13 September 1956.)	邓颖超	By-elected	Member	1904	1924	1992	Guangxi	Han	Female	
51	Chen Shaomin (Note: Chen Shaomin was elected as an alternate by the 7th National Congress in 1945. She was by-elected to member-status at the 7th Plenary Session of the 7th Central Committee, held on 22 August – 13 September 1956.)	陈少敏	By-elected	Member	1902	1928	1977	Shandong	Han	Female	
