= Alternates of the 8th Central Committee of the Chinese Communist Party =

The 8th Central Committee of the Chinese Communist Party was elected by the 8th National Congress in 1956. 98 individuals served as alternates during this electoral term. During this electoral term, the plenary sessions of the 7th Central Committee by-elected 18 to member-status.

== Composition ==
Alternates of the 8th Central Committee of the Chinese Communist Party
Ballot	Name		7th CC	9th CC	Birth	PM	Death	Birthplace	Ethnicity	Gender	Ref.
1	Yang Xianzhen (Note: Yang Xianzhen was by-elected to member-status at the 5th Plenary Session of the 8th Central Committee, held on 25 May 1958.)	杨献珍	Nonmember	By-elected	1896	1926	1992	Hubei	Han	Male	
2	Wang Enmao (Note: Wang Enmao was by-elected to member-status at the 5th Plenary Session of the 8th Central Committee, held on 25 May 1958.)	王恩茂	Nonmember	By-elected	1913	1930	2001	Jiangxi	Han	Male	
3	Yang Dezhi (Note: Yang Dezhi was by-elected to member-status at the 11th Plenary Session of the 8th Central Committee, held on 1–12 August 1966.)	楊得志	Nonmember	By-elected	1911	1928	1994	Hunan	Han	Male	
4	Wei Guoqing (Note: Wei Guoqing was by-elected to member-status at the 11th Plenary Session of the 8th Central Committee, held on 1–12 August 1966.)	韋國清	Nonmember	By-elected	1913	1931	1989	Guangxi	Zhuang	Male	
5	Luo Guibo (Note: Luo Guibo was by-elected to member-status at the 11th Plenary Session of the 8th Central Committee, held on 1–12 August 1966.)	羅貴波	Nonmember	By-elected	1907	1927	1995	Jiangxi	Han	Male	
6	Zhang Jingwu (Note: Zhang Jingwu was by-elected to member-status at the 11th Plenary Session of the 8th Central Committee, held on 1–12 August 1966.)	張經武	Nonmember	By-elected	1906	1930	1971	Hunan	Han	Male	
7	Xie Juezai (Note: Xie Juezai was by-elected to member-status at the 11th Plenary Session of the 8th Central Committee, held on 1–12 August 1966.)	謝覺哉	Nonmember	By-elected	1884	1925	1971	Hunan	Han	Male	
8	Ye Fei (Note: Ye Fei was by-elected to member-status at the 11th Plenary Session of the 8th Central Committee, held on 1–12 August 1966.)	葉飛	Nonmember	By-elected	1914	1932	1999	Philippines	Han	Male	
9	Yang Chengwu	杨成武	Nonmember	Nonmember	1914	1930	2004	Fujian	Han	Male	
10	Gan Siqi	甘泗淇	Nonmember	Nonmember	1904	1926	1964	Hunan	Han	Male	
11	Zhang Hanfu	章汉夫	Nonmember	Nonmember	1905	1927	1972	Jiangsu	Han	Male	
12	Pan Zili	潘自力	Nonmember	Nonmember	1904	1926	1972	Shaanxi	Han	Male	
13	Li Dazhang (Note: Li Dazhang was by-elected to member-status at the 12th Plenary Session of the 8th Central Committee, held on 13–31 October 1968.)	李大章	Nonmember	By-elected	1900	1924	1976	Sichuan	Han	Male	
14	Xu Shiyou (Note: Xu Shiyou was by-elected to member-status at the 12th Plenary Session of the 8th Central Committee, held on 13–31 October 1968.)	許世友	Nonmember	By-elected	1905	1927	1985	Henan	Han	Male	
15	Shuai Mengqi	帅孟奇	Nonmember	Nonmember	1897	1926	1998	Hunan	Han	Female	
16	Yang Yong	杨勇	Nonmember	Nonmember	1913	1930	1983	Hunan	Han	Male	
17	Liu Ren	刘仁	Nonmember	Nonmember	1909	1927	1973	Chongqing	Han	Male	
18	Chen Xilian (Note: Chen Xilian was by-elected to member-status at the 12th Plenary Session of the 8th Central Committee, held on 13–31 October 1968.)	陈锡联	Nonmember	By-elected	1915	1930	1999	Hubei	Han	Male	
19	Wan Yi	万毅	Alternate	Nonmember	1907	1938	1997	Liaoning	Manchu	Male	
20	Zhang Zongxun	张宗逊	Nonmember	Nonmember	1908	1926	1998	Shaanxi	Han	Male	
21	Zhou Yang	周扬	Nonmember	Nonmember	1908	1927	1989	Hunan	Han	Male	
22	Huang Huoqing	黄火青	Nonmember	Nonmember	1901	1926	1999	Hubei	Han	Male	
23	Li Tao	李涛	Nonmember	Nonmember	1905	1926	1970	Hunan	Han	Male	
24	Chen Qihan	陈奇涵	Nonmember	Member	1897	1925	1981	Jiangxi	Han	Male	
25	Chen Manyuan	陈漫远	Nonmember	Nonmember	1911	1927	1986	Guangxi	Han	Male	
26	Xu Zirong	徐子榮	Nonmember	Nonmember	1907	1927	1969	Henan	Han	Male	
27	Huang Oudong	黄欧东	Nonmember	Nonmember	1905	1925	1993	Jiangxi	Han	Male	
28	Gu Dacun	古大存	Alternate	Nonmember	1896	1924	1966	Guangdong	Han	Male	
29	Li Zhimin	李志民	Nonmember	Nonmember	1906	1927	1987	Hunan	Han	Male	
30	Liu Lanbo	刘澜波	Nonmember	Nonmember	1904	1928	1982	Liaoning	Han	Male	
31	Su Zhenhua	苏振华	Nonmember	Nonmember	1912	1930	1979	Hunan	Han	Male	
32	Feng Baiju	冯白驹	Nonmember	Nonmember	1903	1926	1973	Hainan	Han	Male	
33	Zhou Baozhong	周保中	Nonmember	Nonmember	1902	1927	1964	Yunnan	Bai	Male	
34	Wu De (Note: Wu De was by-elected to member-status at the 12th Plenary Session of the 8th Central Committee, held on 13–31 October 1968.)	吳德	Nonmember	By-elected	1913	1933	1995	Hebei	Han	Male	
35	Kui Bi	奎璧	Nonmember	Nonmember	1903	1925	1986	Inner Mongolia	Mongolian	Male	
36	Zhang Desheng	张德生	Nonmember	Nonmember	1909	1930	1965	Shaanxi	Han	Male	
37	Qu Mengjue	区梦觉	Nonmember	Nonmember	1906	1926	1992	Guangdong	Han	Female	
38	Fan Wenlan	范文瀾	Nonmember	Member	1893	1926	1969	Zhejiang	Han	Male	
39	Zhu Dehai	朱德海	Nonmember	Nonmember	1911	1931	1972	Jilin	Korean	Male	
40	Shao Shiping	邵式平	Nonmember	Nonmember	1900	1925	1965	Jiangxi	Han	Male	
41	Zhang Qilong	張啟龍	Nonmember	Nonmember	1900	1926	1987	Hunan	Han	Male	
42	Huang Yongsheng (Note: Huang Yongsheng was by-elected to member-status at the 12th Plenary Session of the 8th Central Committee, held on 13–31 October 1968.)	黃永勝	Nonmember	By-elected	1910	1927	1983	Hubei	Han	Male	
43	Li Jianzhen	李堅真	Nonmember	Nonmember	1907	1927	1992	Guangdong	Han	Female	
44	Ma Wenrui	马文瑞	Nonmember	Nonmember	1912	1928	2004	Shaanxi	Han	Male	
45	Zhang Linzhi	张霖之	Nonmember	Nonmember	1908	1929	1967	Hebei	Han	Male	
46	Zhang Xi	張璽	Nonmember	Nonmember	1912	1934	1959	Hebei	Han	Male	
47	Wang Shitai	王世泰	Nonmember	Nonmember	1910	1929	2008	Shaanxi	Han	Male	
48	Yan Hongyan	閻紅彥	Nonmember	Nonmember	1909	1925	1967	Shaanxi	Han	Male	
49	Tian Bao	天宝	Nonmember	Member	1917	1935	2008	Sichuan	Tibetan	Male	
50	Zhang Dazhi (Note: Zhang Dazhi was by-elected to member-status at the 12th Plenary Session of the 8th Central Committee, held on 13–31 October 1968.)	张达志	Nonmember	By-elected	1911	1929	1992	Shaanxi	Han	Male	
51	Gao Kelin	高克林	Nonmember	Nonmember	1907	1925	2001	Shaanxi	Han	Male	
52	Seypidin	赛福鼎	Nonmember	Member	1915	1949	2003	Xinjiang	Uyghur	Male	
53	Liao Hansheng	廖漢生	Nonmember	Nonmember	1911	1933	2006	Hunan	Tujia	Male	
54	Hong Xuezhi	洪学智	Nonmember	Nonmember	1913	1929	2006	Anhui	Han	Male	
55	Zhang Yun	章蕴	Nonmember	Nonmember	1905	1925	1995	Hunan	Han	Female	
56	Xu Bing	徐冰	Nonmember	Nonmember	1903	1924	1972	Hebei	Han	Male	
57	Jiang Weiqing	江渭清	Nonmember	Nonmember	1910	1929	2000	Hunan	Han	Male	
58	Liao Luyan	廖鲁言	Nonmember	Nonmember	1913	1932	1972	Jiangsu	Han	Male	
59	Song Shilun	宋時輪	Nonmember	Nonmember	1907	1926	1991	Hunan	Han	Male	
60	Tan Qilong	譚啟龍	Nonmember	Nonmember	1913	1933	2003	Jiangxi	Han	Male	
61	Zhou Huan	周桓	Nonmember	Nonmember	1909	1930	1993	Liaoning	Han	Male	
62	Zhong Qiguang	钟期光	Nonmember	Nonmember	1909	1926	1991	Hunan	Han	Male	
63	Chen Pixian	陈丕显	Nonmember	Nonmember	1916	1931	1995	Fujian	Han	Male	
64	Zhao Jianmin	趙健民	Nonmember	Nonmember	1912	1932	2012	Shandong	Han	Male	
65	Cai Shufan	蔡树藩	Nonmember	Nonmember	1905	1925	1958	Hubei	Han	Male	
66	Qian Junrui	錢俊瑞	Nonmember	Nonmember	1908	1935	1985	Jiangsu	Han	Male	
67	Pan Fusheng (Note: Pan Fusheng was by-elected to member-status at the 12th Plenary Session of the 8th Central Committee, held on 13–31 October 1968.)	潘復生	Nonmember	By-elected	1908	1931	1980	Shandong	Han	Male	
68	Jiang Nanxiang	蔣南翔	Nonmember	Nonmember	1913	1933	1988	Jiangsu	Han	Male	
69	Jiang Hua	江华	Nonmember	Nonmember	1907	1926	1999	Hunan	Yao	Male	
70	Han Guang	韓光	Nonmember	Nonmember	1912	1931	2008	Heilongjiang	Han	Male	
71	Li Chang	李昌	Nonmember	Nonmember	1914	1936	2010	Hunan	Tujia	Male	
72	Wang Heshou	王鶴壽	Nonmember	Nonmember	1909	1925	1999	Hebei	Han	Male	
73	Chen Zhengren	陈正人	Nonmember	Nonmember	1907	1925	1972	Jiangxi	Han	Male	
74	Wang Renzhong (Note: Wang Renzhong was by-elected at the 2nd Session of the 8th National Congress, held on 5–23 May 1958.)	王任重	By-elected	Nonmember	1917	1933	1992	Hebei	Han	Male	
75	Zhang Zhongliang (Note: Zhang Zhongliang was by-elected at the 2nd Session of the 8th National Congress, held on 5–23 May 1958.)	张仲良	By-elected	Nonmember	1907	1931	1983	Shaanxi	Han	Male	
76	Tao Lujia (Note: Tao Lujia was by-elected at the 2nd Session of the 8th National Congress, held on 5–23 May 1958.)	陶鲁笳	By-elected	Nonmember	1917	1936	2011	Jiangsu	Han	Male	
77	Peng Tao (Note: Peng Tao was by-elected at the 2nd Session of the 8th National Congress, held on 5–23 May 1958.)	彭濤	By-elected	Nonmember	1913	1932	1961	Jiangxi	Han	Male	
78	Liu Jianxun (Note: Liu Jianxun was by-elected as an alternate at the 2nd Session of the 8th National Congress, held on 5–23 May 1958. Later, at the 12th Plenary Session of the 8th Central Committee held on 13–31 October 1968, he was elected to member-status.)	刘建勋	By-elected	By-elected	1913	1931	1983	Hebei	Han	Male	
79	Zhao Yimin (Note: Zhao Yimin was by-elected at the 2nd Session of the 8th National Congress, held on 5–23 May 1958.)	赵毅敏	By-elected	Nonmember	1904	1926	2002	Henan	Han	Male	
80	Kong Yuan (Note: Kong Yuan was by-elected at the 2nd Session of the 8th National Congress, held on 5–23 May 1958.)	孔原	By-elected	Nonmember	1906	1925	1990	Jiangxi	Han	Male	
81	Tang Liang (Note: Tang Liang was by-elected at the 2nd Session of the 8th National Congress, held on 5–23 May 1958.)	唐亮	By-elected	Alternate	1910	1930	1986	Hunan	Han	Male	
82	Liu Zihou (Note: Liu Zihou was by-elected as an alternate at the 2nd Session of the 8th National Congress, held on 5–23 May 1958. Later, at the 12th Plenary Session of the 8th Central Committee held on 13–31 October 1968, he was elected to member-status.)	劉子厚	By-elected	By-elected	1911	1929	2001	Hebei	Han	Male	
83	Zhang Su (Note: Zhang Su was by-elected at the 2nd Session of the 8th National Congress, held on 5–23 May 1958.)	張蘇	By-elected	Nonmember	1901	1927	1988	Hebei	Han	Male	
84	Yang Yichen (Note: Yang Yichen was by-elected at the 2nd Session of the 8th National Congress, held on 5–23 May 1958.)	楊一辰	By-elected	Nonmember	1905	1927	1980	Shandong	Han	Male	
85	Wang Feng (Note: Wang Feng was by-elected at the 2nd Session of the 8th National Congress, held on 5–23 May 1958.)	汪锋	By-elected	Nonmember	1910	1927	1998	Shaanxi	Han	Male	
86	Zhou Xiaozhou (Note: Zhou Xiaozhou was by-elected at the 2nd Session of the 8th National Congress, held on 5–23 May 1958.)	周小舟	By-elected	Nonmember	1912	1935	1966	Hunan	Han	Male	
87	Fang Yi (Note: Fang Yi was by-elected at the 2nd Session of the 8th National Congress, held on 5–23 May 1958.)	方毅	By-elected	Alternate	1916	1931	1997	Fujian	Han	Male	
88	Wang Shangrong (Note: Wang Shangrong was by-elected at the 2nd Session of the 8th National Congress, held on 5–23 May 1958.)	王尚榮	By-elected	Nonmember	1915	1932	2000	Hubei	Han	Male	
89	Liu Zhen (Note: Liu Zhen was by-elected at the 2nd Session of the 8th National Congress, held on 5–23 May 1958.)	刘震	By-elected	Nonmember	1915	1932	1995	Hubei	Han	Male	
90	Zhang Pinghua (Note: Zhang Pinghua was by-elected at the 2nd Session of the 8th National Congress, held on 5–23 May 1958.)	张平化	By-elected	Nonmember	1908	1927	2001	Hunan	Han	Male	
91	Zhang Xianfu (Note: Zhang Xianfu was by-elected at the 2nd Session of the 8th National Congress, held on 5–23 May 1958.)	張勁夫	By-elected	Nonmember	1914	1935	2015	Anhui	Han	Male	
92	Han Xianchu (Note: Han Xianchu was by-elected as an alternate at the 2nd Session of the 8th National Congress, held on 5–23 May 1958. Later, at the 12th Plenary Session of the 8th Central Committee held on 13–31 October 1968, he was elected to member-status.)	韓先楚	By-elected	By-elected	1913	1930	1986	Hubei	Han	Male	
93	Li Jiebo (Note: Li Jiebo was by-elected at the 2nd Session of the 8th National Congress, held on 5–23 May 1958.)	李颉伯	By-elected	Nonmember	1911	1932	1987	Hebei	Han	Male	
94	Liao Zhigao (Note: Liao Zhigao was by-elected at the 2nd Session of the 8th National Congress, held on 5–23 May 1958.)	廖志高	By-elected	Nonmember	1913	1934	2000	Sichuan	Han	Male	
95	Zhao Boping (Note: Zhao Boping was by-elected at the 2nd Session of the 8th National Congress, held on 5–23 May 1958.)	趙伯平	By-elected	Nonmember	1902	1927	1993	Shaanxi	Han	Male	
96	Sun Zhiyuan (Note: Sun Zhiyuan was by-elected at the 2nd Session of the 8th National Congress, held on 5–23 May 1958.)	孙志远	By-elected	Nonmember	1911	1930	1966	Hebei	Han	Male	
97	Zhang Aiping (Note: Zhang Aiping was by-elected at the 2nd Session of the 8th National Congress, held on 5–23 May 1958.)	張愛萍	By-elected	Nonmember	1910	1928	2003	Sichuan	Han	Male	
98	Yao Yilin (Note: Yao Yilin was by-elected at the 2nd Session of the 8th National Congress, held on 5–23 May 1958.)	姚依林	By-elected	Nonmember	1917	1935	1994	Anhui	Han	Male	
