= Members of the 6th Central Committee of the Chinese Communist Party =

The 6th Central Committee of the Chinese Communist Party was elected by the 6th National Congress in 1928. 58 individuals served as members during this electoral term. During this electoral term, the plenary sessions of the 6th Central Committee and sessions of the 6th Politburo organised several by-elections.

== Members ==
Members of the 6th Central Committee of the Chinese Communist Party
Name		5th CC	7th CC	Birth	PM	Death	Birthplace	Ethnicity	Gender	Ref.
Bo Gu (Note: Bo Gu was by-elected by the 4th Plenary Session of the 6th Central Committee in January 1931.)	博古	Nonmember	Member	1907	1925	1946	Jiangsu	Han	Male	
Cai Hesen (Note: Cai Hesen was executed by Kuomintang state authorities on 4 August 1931.)	蔡和森	Member	Nonmember	1895	1921	1931	Shanghai	Han	Male	
Chen Changhao (Note: Chen Changhao was by-elected by the 6th Politburo in August 1935.)	陈昌浩	Nonmember	Nonmember	1906	1927	1967	Hubei	Han	Male	
Chen Yu (Note: Chen Yu was by-elected by the 3rd Plenary Session of the 6th Central Committee in September 1930.)	陈郁	Nonmember	Nonmember	1901	1925	1974	Shenzhen	Han	Male	
Chen Yun (Note: Chen Yun was by-elected by the 4th Plenary Session of the 6th Central Committee in January 1931.)	陈云	Nonmember	Member	1905	1925	1995	Shanghai	Han	Male	
Deng Fa (Note: Deng Fa was by-elected by the 3rd Plenary Session of the 6th Central Committee in September 1930.)	邓发	Nonmember	Nonmember	1906	1928	1946	Guangdong	Han	Male	
Dong Biwu (Note: Dong Biwu was by-elected by the 6th Plenary Session of the 6th Central Committee in November 1938.)	董必武	Nonmember	Member	1886	1921	1975	Hubei	Han	Male	
Fang Zhimin (Note: Fang Zhimin was by-elected by the 5th Plenary Session of the 6th Central Committee in January 1934.)	方志敏	Nonmember	Nonmember	1899	1924	1935	Jiangxi	Han	Male	
Gu Shunzhang (Note: Gu Shunzhang was arrested by Kuomintang authorities on 24 April 1931 and later defected to their side.)	顾顺章	Member	Nonmember	1904	1924	1935	Jiangsu	Han	Male	
Gu Zuolin (Note: Gu Zuolin was by-elected by the 5th Plenary Session of the 6th Central Committee in January 1934. He died of natural causes on 28 May 1934.)	顾作霖	Nonmember	Nonmember	1908	1925	1934	Jiangsu	Han	Male	
Guan Xiangying	关向应	Nonmember	Member	1902	1925	1946	Liaoning	Manchu	Male	
Han Lianhui (Note: Han Lianhui was by-elected by the 4th Plenary Session of the 6th Central Committee in January 1931. He was arrested by Kuomintang state authorities in April 1931 and defected to their cause. He was executed after the founding of the People's Republic of China at an undisclosed date.)	韩连会	Nonmember	Nonmember	?	1926	?	Hebei	Hui	Male	
He Chang (Note: He Chang was by-elected by the 3rd Plenary Session of the 6th Central Committee in September 1930. He was removed as a member by a decision of the 4th Plenary Session in January 1931.)	贺昌	Member	Nonmember	1906	1923	1935	Shanxi	Han	Male	
Kai Feng (Note: Kai Feng was by-elected by the 5th Plenary Session of the 6th Central Committee in January 1934.)	凯丰	Nonmember	Nonmember	1906	1930	1955	Jiangxi	Han	Male	
Kang Sheng (Note: Kang Sheng was by-elected by the 6th Politburo in September 1931.)	康生	Nonmember	Member	1898	1925	1975	Shandong	Han	Male	
Li Disheng (Note: Li Disheng was unbeknown to the Communist Party arrested by Kuomintang state authorities in May–June 1928 and defected to their cause. This was discovered in November and publicly revealed in December 1928.)	李涤生	Member	Nonmember	1887	1922	1930	Hunan	Han	Male	
Li Lisan (Note: Li Lisan was arrested by Soviet state authorities and expelled from the Communist Party in April–May 1938.)	李立三	Member	Member	1899	1921	1967	Hunan	Han	Male	
Li Weihan (Note: Li Weihan was by-elected by the 3rd Plenary Session of the 6th Central Committee in September 1930. He was removed as a member by a decision of the 4th Plenary Session of the 6th Central Committee in January 1931. He was reelected by the 6th Politburo in January 1935.)	李维汉	Member	Nonmember	1896	1921	1984	Hunan	Han	Male	
Li Xiannian (Note: Li Xiannian was by-elected by a decision of the 7th Plenary Session of the 6th Central Committee in 1945.)	李先念	Nonmember	Member	1909	1927	1992	Hubei	Han	Male	
Li Yuan (Note: Li Yuan was arrested and executed by Kuomintang state authorities in September 1928.)	李源	Nonmember	Nonmember	1904	1925	1928	Guangdong	Han	Male	
Lin Boqu (Note: Lin Boqu was by-elected by the 6th Plenary Session of the 6th Central Committee in November 1938.)	林伯渠	Nonmember	Member	1886	1921	1960	Hunan	Han	Male	
Lin Yuying (Note: Lin Yuying was by-elected by the 6th Plenary Session of the 6th Central Committee in November 1938. He died of natural causes on 6 March 1942.)	林育英	Nonmember	Nonmember	1897	1922	1942	Hubei	Han	Male	
Liu Shaoqi (Note: Liu Shaoqi was by-elected by the 4th Plenary Session of the 6th Central Committee in January 1931.)	刘少奇	Member	Member	1898	1921	1969	Henan	Han	Male	
Lu Futan (Note: Lu Futan was arrested in January 1933 and later defected to the Kuomintang.)	卢福坦	Nonmember	Nonmember	1890	1926	1969	Shandong	Han	Male	
Lu Wenzhi (Note: Lu Wenzhi was by-elected by the 3rd Plenary Session of the 6th Central Committee in September 1930. His whereabouts have remained unknown since November 1931.)	陆文治	Nonmember	Nonmember	?	?	1931	Guangdong	Han	Male	
Luo Dengxian (Note: Luo Dengxian was arrested and executed by Kuomintang state authorities on 29 August 1933.)	罗登贤	Member	Nonmember	1905	1925	1933	Guangdong	Han	Male	
Mao Zedong	毛泽东	Alternate	Member	1893	1921	1976	Hunan	Han	Male	
Peng Dehuai (Note: Peng Dehuai was by-elected by the 6th Politburo in 1936.)	彭德怀	Nonmember	Member	1898	1928	1974	Hunan	Han	Male	
Peng Pai (Note: Peng Pai was arrested on 24 August and executed by Kuomintang state authorities on 30 August 1929.)	彭湃	Member	Nonmember	1896	1921	1929	Guangdong	Han	Male	
Qu Qiubai (Note: Qu Qiubai was arrested after the collapse of the Chinese Soviet Republic and executed by Kuomintang state authorities on 18 June 1935.)	瞿秋白	Member	Nonmember	1899	1921	1935	Fujian	Han	Male	
Ren Bishi	任弼时	Member	Member	1904	1922	1950	Hunan	Han	Male	
Shen Xianding (Note: Shen Xianding was by-elected by the 4th Plenary Session of the 6th Central Committee in January 1931. He was arrested and defected in March 1933, and his whereabouts have been unknown since.)	沈先定	Nonmember	Nonmember	?	?	1933	Zhejiang	Han	Male	
Su Zhaozheng (Note: Su Zhaozheng died of illness caused by overwork on 25 February 1929.)	苏兆征	Member	Nonmember	1885	1925	1929	Guangdong	Han	Male	
Tang Hongjing (Note: Tang Hongjing was by-elected by the 6th Politburo in November 1928. He was arrested by Kuomintang state authorities in January 1931.)	唐宏经	Nonmember	Nonmember	1901	1926	2005	Liaoning	Han	Male	
Wang Fengfei (Note: Wang Fengfei was by-elected by the 6th Politburo in November 1928. He died during the Chinese Civil War, presumably in January 1931.)	王凤飞	Nonmember	Nonmember	1903	1926	1933	Jiangxi	Han	Male	
Wang Jiaxiang (Note: Wang Jiaxiang was by-elected by the 5th Plenary Session of the 6th Central Committee in January 1934.)	王稼祥	Nonmember	Alternate	1906	1928	1974	Anhui	Han	Male	
Wang Kequan (Note: Wang Kequan was by-elected by the 4th Plenary Session of the 6th Central Committee in January 1931. He was removed on 27 January that same year for participating in factional activities.)	王克全	Nonmember	Nonmember	1906	1924	1939	Anhui	Han	Male	
Wang Ming (Note: Wang Ming was by-elected by the 4th Plenary Session of the 6th Central Committee in January 1931.)	王明	Nonmember	Member	1904	1925	1974	Anhui	Han	Male	
Wang Zaowen (Note: Wang Zaowen defected to the Kuomintang at one point in 1928/29, but was discovered and the Shunzhi Provincial Party Committee of the Communist Party tortured him as punishment, which caused faital injuries that caused his death on 31 May 1929.)	王藻文	Nonmember	Nonmember	?	1924	1929	Hebei	Han	Male	
Wang Zhuo (Note: Wang Zhuo was by-elected by the 6th Politburo in November 1928. He was arrested by Kuomintang state authorities in September 1931.)	王灼	Nonmember	Nonmember	1898	1926	1932	Guangdong	Han	Male	
Wen Yucheng (Note: Wen Yucheng was by-elected by the 3rd Plenary Session of the 6th Central Committee in September 1930. He died of natural causes in 1933.)	温裕成	Nonmember	Nonmember	1908	1927	1933	Jiangsu	Han	Male	
Wu Yuzhang (Note: Wu Yuzhang was by-elected by the 6th Plenary Session of the 6th Central Committee in November 1938.)	吴玉章	Nonmember	Member	1878	1925	1966	Hubei	Han	Male	
Xiang Ying (Note: Killed in action on 14 March 1941.)	项英	Member	Nonmember	1895	1921	1941	Anhui	Han	Male	
Xiang Zhongfa (Note: Xiang Zhongfa was killed on 24 June 1931.)	向忠发	Member	Nonmember	1879	1921	1931	Shanghai	Han	Male	
Xu Binggen (Note: Xu Binggen was by-elected by the 3rd Plenary Session of the 6th Central Committee in September 1930. He was arrested and defected in 1932, and his whereabouts have been unknown since.)	徐炳根	Nonmember	Nonmember	?	?	1932	Jiangsu	Han	Male	
Xu Lanzhi (Note: Xu Lanzhi was given member-status by a decision of the 6th Politburo in November 1928.)	徐兰芝	Nonmember	Nonmember	?	?	1931	Henan	Han	Female	
Xu Weisan (Note: Xu Weisan was by-elected by the 4th Plenary Session of the 6th Central Committee in January 1931. He was arrested in 1932 and defected to the side of the Kuomintang. Xu disappeared from public view in 1935.)	许畏三	Nonmember	Nonmember	?	?	1935	Zhejiang	Han	Male	
Xu Xiangqian (Note: Xu Xiangqian was by-elected by the 6th Politburo in August 1935.)	徐向前	Nonmember	Member	1901	1927	1990	Shanxi	Han	Male	
Xu Xigen (Note: Xu Xigen was arrested and defected in 1932, and his whereabouts have been unknown since.)	徐锡根	Nonmember	Nonmember	?	1926	1932	Jiangsu	Han	Male	
Yang Futao (Note: Yang Futao had died of June 1928 unbeknown to party, and the 6th National Congress elected him to the 6th Central Committee in July 1928.)	杨福涛	Nonmember	Nonmember	1893	1922	1928	Hunan	Han	Male	
Yang Yin (Note: Peng Pai was arrested on 24 August and executed on 30 August 1929.)	杨殷	Nonmember	Nonmember	1892	1922	1929	Guangdong	Han	Male	
Yu Maohuai (Note: Yu Maohuai was arrested and defected in 1932, and his whereabouts have been unknown since.)	余茂怀	Nonmember	Nonmember	?	?	1932	Hubei	Han	Male	
Zhang Guotao	张国焘	Member	Nonmember	1897	1921	1979	Sichuan	Han	Male	
Zhang Jinbao (Note: Zhang Jinbao was arrested in July 1931. She was later reelected as a member by the 7th Plenary Session of the 6th Central Committee in April–June 1945.)	张金保	Nonmember	Nonmember	1897	1926	1984	Zhejiang	Han	Female	
Zhang Wentian (Note: Zhang Wentian was by-elected by the 6th Politburo in September 1931.)	张闻天	Nonmember	Member	1907	1925	1946	Shanghai	Han	Male	
Zhou Chunquan (Note: Zhou Chunquan was by-elected by the 6th Politburo in August 1935.)	周纯全	Nonmember	Nonmember	1905	1926	1985	Hubei	Han	Male	
Zhou Enlai	周恩来	Member	Member	1898	1921	1976	Jiangsu	Han	Male	
Zhu De (Note: Zhu De was by-elected by the 5th Plenary Session of the 6th Central Committee in January 1934.)	朱德	Nonmember	Member	1886	1925	1976	Sichuan	Han	Male	

== See also ==
- Alternates of the 6th Central Committee of the Chinese Communist Party
