= Wu Zhongqi =

Wu Zhongqi (September 20, 1907 - March 29, 2006, Chinese: 武中奇), a native of Changqing County, Shandong Province. He was a member of the Standing Committee of the Jiangsu Provincial People's Congress, vice-president of the Jiangsu Academy of Chinese Painting and Calligraphy, director and advisor of the Chinese Calligraphers Association, advisor to the Jiangsu Provincial Federation of Literature and Art, chairman and advisor of the Jiangsu Calligraphers Association, and director of the Nanjing Cultural Relics Management Committee.

== Biography ==
He was born into an impoverished peasant family and accompanied his parents to Jinan as an adolescent to earn a livelihood. At the beginning of 1936, the CCP Eastern Provincial Committee's organs were situated in his residence, having been rebuilt shortly after being destroyed by the Kuomintang. He was introduced to the CCP by Li Yu (Chinese: 黎玉), the secretary of the CCP Eastern Provincial Committee, in the same year. Following the July 7th Incident in 1937, he traveled to Tai'an with the CCP Shandong Provincial Committee. In January 1938, he took part in the anti-Japanese armed uprising at Mount Culai (Chinese: 徂徕山). He held the positions of platoon leader, squadron leader, battalion commander, special forces brigade leader, and chief of the ninth detachment in the Shandong Column of the Eighth Route Army. In 1941, he enrolled in the second training course of the Party School of the CCP Shandong Branch.

Wu Zhongqi was dispatched as a member of the Jinan Work Committee and director of the Jinan Anti-Japanese Democratic Government Office in June 1943, when the Shandong branch of the CPC decided to re-establish the CPC Jinan Work Committee and establish the Jinan Anti-Japanese Democratic Government Office. Wu Zhongqi was also appointed as the first governor of the Anti-Japanese Democratic Government of Lixing County. The Jinan Municipal Democratic Government was established in September 1944 and the Jinan Anti-Japanese Democratic Government Office was abolished in August 1945. Wu was appointed as the secretary-general of the municipal government. The Jinan Democratic Government was established in August 1945, following the abolition of the Jinan Anti-Japanese Democratic Government Office. He was transferred to the Relief Branch of the United Nations Relief and Works Agency for the Liberated Areas of Shandong Province in November 1945, where he was responsible for the day-to-day operations of the Branch.

In 1949, Wu Zhongqi took part in the takeover of Shanghai and served as the chief of the Secretarial Section of the Shanghai Municipal People's Government. He also became the Chief of Staff of the Southern Cadre Column of the Third Field Army. Wuzhongqi was appointed director of the Nanjing Watch Factory in 1959 and served as director of the Nanjing Cultural Relics Custodian Committee in 1963. In the spring of 1973, he was vindicated and imprisoned in the Cultural Revolution. He was appointed vice president of the National Painting Institute of Jiangsu Province in 1979 and a member of the Standing Committee of the Jiangsu Provincial People's Congress in 1980. He perished in Nanjing on March 29, 2006, at the age of 98, after serving as the chairman of the Jiangsu Calligraphers Association.
