= Qian Jin Bao =

Chinese-language newspaper

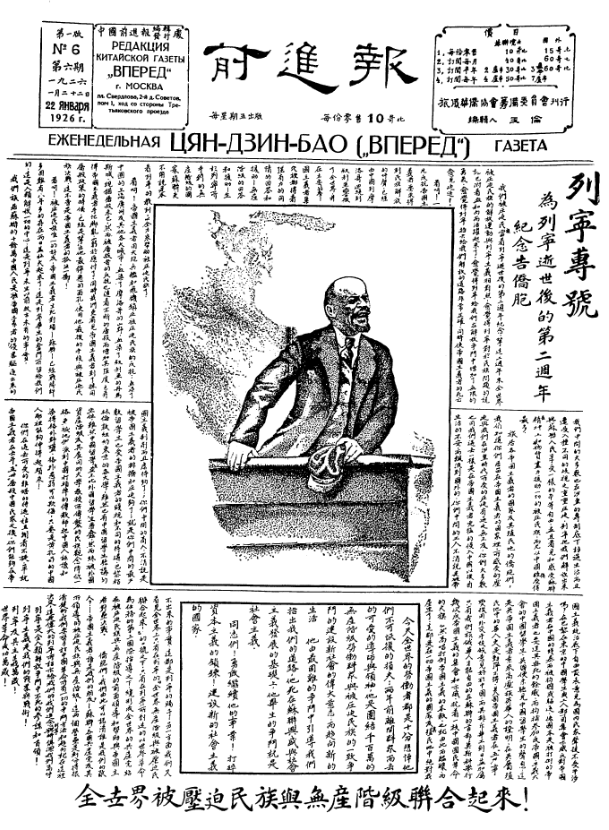
- January 22, 1926 issue of Qian Jin Bao, featuring an image of Vladimir Lenin
- Publisher: Fan Shideng
- Editor: Yu Lun
- Founded: December 18, 1925
- Ceased publication: May 28, 1926
- Language: Chinese
- Headquarters: Sverdlov Street
- City: Moscow
- Country: Soviet Union
- Circulation: 3,000-6,000

Qian Jin Bao (Chinese: 前進報, 'Forward Newspaper') was a Chinese language newspaper published from Moscow, Soviet Union, between December 18, 1925 and May 28, 1926. Qian Jin Bao was the organ of the Preparatory Committee of Chinese Emigrants in Russia. Two issues were published in 1925 and 18 issues were published in 1926.

After the 1925 May 30 Movement in Shanghai, groups like the Chinese Anti-Imperialist League in Russia and the Preparatory Committee of Chinese Emigrants in Russia emerged. The new organizational activities prompted the launch of new press outlets such as Qian Jin Bao. Qian Jin Bao was set up by Chinese students at the Sun Yat-sen Communist University of the Toilers of China (KUTK) and Communist University of the Toilers of the East (KUTV). Published weekly on Fridays by Fan Shideng, the editorial office was located at Sverdlov Street and Yu Lun served as the main editor of Qian Jin Bao, though Liang Kun also took part in editing. The newspaper had a print run of 3,000 to 6,000 and issues generally had four pages. The masthead of the newspaper, below the Chinese name, provided the transliterated the name in Cyrillic alphabet 'Цян-Дзин-Бао' and the Russian translated name 'Вперёд'. The newspaper was a handwritten lithograph.

The newspaper carried news from China, the Soviet Union, and other countries. Chinese news items generally originated from newspapers such as the Chenbao (Beijing), Ta Kung Pao (Tianjin) and Shen Bao (Shanghai). The newspaper was supportive of the Kuomintang movement. During Kuomintang leader Hu Hanmin's visit to the Soviet Union 1925-1926 Qian Jin Bao reported extensively on his activities in the countries and published various of his speeches in full. Soviet and international news were largely translations of articles from Pravda and Izvestia. Lectures on political economy at the KUTV and KUTK were translated into Chinese by university students and reprinted in Qian Jin Bao. Qian Jin Bao included illustrations, photos and advertisements. Unlike other similar Chinese-language publications at the time, Qian Jin Bao carried political cartoons. Interviews featured in the newspaper were generally done by Chinese students in Moscow or Leningrad. The newspaper would have special issues for occasions such as commemorations of the 1905 Russian Revolution, the October Revolution, International Women's Day and Sun Yat-sen's and Vladimir Lenin's respective death anniversaries.

Qian Jin Bao was distributed internationally at a cost of 15 kopeks (as opposed to 10 kopeks if sold in the Soviet Union). When French secret police searched the hotel room in Boulogne-Billancourt that had lodged the young Chinese communists Deng Xiaoping, Fu Zhong and Yang Pinsun in early 1926, they encountered copies of Qian Jin Bao. In 1996, the Institute of Modern History of Academia Sinica in Taiwan published a reprint of the issues of Qian Jin Bao.
