= Wu Yuzhang Honors College =

College of Sichuan University, China

Coordinates: 30°37′55″N 104°4′44″E

Wu Yuzhang Honors College (Chinese: 四川大学吴玉章学院) is an undergraduate college of Sichuan University.

== Introduction ==
Named after famous educator and former Sichuan University President Wu Yuzhang, Wuyuzhang Honorary College was founded in 2006 and the dean of the college is Professor Lin Zhang, the vice-president of Sichuan University.

The Wuyuzhang Honors College has The Honors College motto of "honor and erudition, modesty and kindness". The college principles of talent training are "value shaping, interdisciplinary training, potential unleashing, and international vision". Combining the university's multidisciplinary strengths with high-quality teaching, the Honors College creates an environment for undergraduate students to think, explore and innovate independently and critically. Combined with the college's sophisticated disciplines, faculty, and digital facilities, students can strive to become leaders, creators, inventors, and pioneers.
