= Fu Zhong =

General of the People's Republic of China

- 傅钟
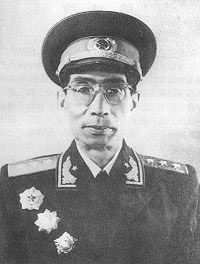

Deputy Director of the People's Liberation Army General Political Department
- In office September 1949 – March 1985
- Chairman: Mao Zedong
- Preceded by: Post established
- Succeeded by: Xiao Hua

Personal details
- Born: 23 June 1900 Luoyu County, Sichuan
- Died: July 28, 1989 (aged 89) Beijing
- Education: Moscow Sun Yat-sen University
- Awards: Order of Bayi (First Class) Order of Independence and Freedom (First Class) Order of Liberation (China) (First Class)

Military service
- Allegiance: China
- Branch/service: People's Liberation Army
- Years of service: 1921–1989
- Rank: General
- Commands: Red Fourth Army
- Battles/wars: Northern Expedition, Long March, Encirclement Campaigns, Second Sino-Japanese War, Chinese Civil War

Fu Zhong (simplified Chinese: 傅钟; traditional Chinese: 傅鍾; pinyin: Fù Zhōng; 23 June 1900 – 28 July 1989) was a general in the People's Liberation Army of the People's Republic of China from Sichuan.

Fu Zhong joined the Chinese Communist party in 1921, and graduated from the Moscow Sun Yat-sen University in 1930. He was appointed as the head of the political department in the Counter-Japanese Military and Political University and served in various positions in the Eighth Route Army as the political commissar. During the Chinese Civil War, he was the deputy head of the political department in the Central Military Commission. He was one of the earliest military leaders that joined the communist party.

== Biography ==
=== Early life ===
Fu enrolled to Secondary School in 1919 and went to Shanghai in 1921 to study French. During this period, he was affected by the May Fourth Movement and by the winter of 1921, he joined the newly founded Chinese Communist Party. After returning from Russia in 1930, he assisted Zhou Enlai in Shanghai's personnel and military transport work and at the same time participated in the translation of the "Soviet Infantry Fighting Order" and "Soviet Political Work Regulations".

During the Long March in 1935, Fu was responsible for communal distribution and conducting preparatory work for combat. In August, he was elected as an alternate member of the 6th Central Committee. Upon Zhang Guotao's attempt to set up an alternate communist base, Fu classified him as an "alternate member of the Politburo" but refused to work for his branch of the central committee. Following the rendezvous between the 4th Red and 2nd Red Armies in July 1937 he became the director for Central Committee Northwest Organization Department that was based in Shaanbei. He was then appointed as the head of the political department in the Counter-Japanese Military and Political University.

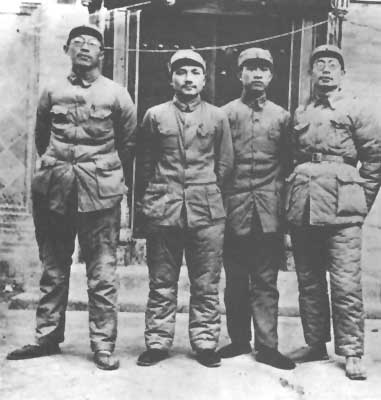
A picture of Eighth Route Army leaders during the Sino-Japanese War. From left, Huang Kecheng, Deng Xiaoping, Fu Zhong

=== During Sino-Japanese War ===
Fu attended the Luochuan Conference in August 1938 and was appointed as the director of civil affairs within the Eighth Route Army's political department. Simultaneously, he put forward the "Political Army Reform Program" which was published alongside "Political Military Order" that involved key leaders such as Zhu De, Peng Dehuai and Zuo Quan. In the spring of 1940, he issued orders for the Eighth Army to be involved in the communes and when he returned to Yan'an during winter, he was holding key positions such as being the deputy director of the CMC's and the Joint Defense Forces' (based at Yan'an) Political Department. In 1945, he participated in the 7th National Congress of the Chinese Communist Party, receiving praise from Mao Zedong for a speech regarding the unity of the party (增强党的团结，反对山头主义) at the meeting.

=== Chinese Civil War (1946–1950) ===
In the beginning of 1946, Fu was transferred to Chongqing to take charge as the President of Xinhua Daily and the Propaganda minister for Sichuan. He also contributed to key doctrines of the CCP's military and politics, such as being involved in the publishing of "The Chinese People's Liberation Army Party Committee Ordinance (Draft)", "Revolutionary Military Commission Regulations", "New Red Army Initial Summary" and other documents. In the 1st National Artists Congress during July 1949, he published a report on the "Contributions of the Army to Art".

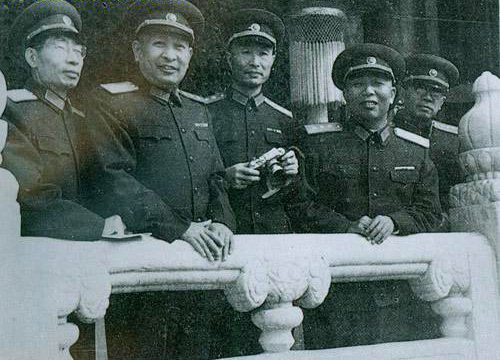
From left: Fu Zhong, Zhong Qiguang, Zhang Aiping, Song Shilun, Li Tao at Tiananmen, 1 October 1961.

=== After the establishment of the PRC ===
After the founding of the PRC, Fu was appointed as the deputy director of the People's Liberation Army General Political Department. He was a longtime contributor to the army's political and cultural framework. He was awarded first class medals in the Order of Bayi, Order of Independence and Freedom and Order of Liberation. He was proactive in publishing reports that moulded the political framework of the post war CCP. However, he was heavily criticized and checked during the Cultural Revolution. He was elected as the deputy director of the Political Work Department of the Central Military Commission, and was elected as a member of the Standing Committee of the Central Advisory Committee during the 12th CCP National Congress.

Fu was a member of the 1st, 2nd, 3rd Central Military Commission, the 3rd, 5th National People's Congress Standing Committee and was the 3rd and 4th vice chairman of the Chinese Federation for Arts. In 1988 he was awarded with the Honor Merit Medal of Red Star, first class.

Fu died in Beijing on 28 July 1989. He was praised by the CCP as "an outstanding member of the Communist Party of China, an experienced and loyal proletarian revolutionary and our military's outstanding political work leader".
