= Yun Daiying =

Chinese communist soldier

- 恽代英
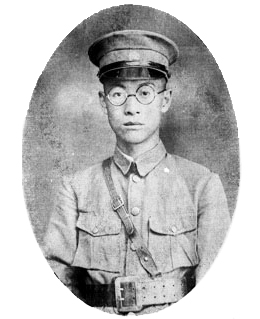

Personal details
- Born: 12 August 1895 Wuchang, Hubei, Qing Dynasty
- Died: 29 April 1931 (aged 35) Nanjing, Jiangsu, Republic of China
- Party: Chinese Communist Party

Yun Daiying
- Traditional Chinese: 惲代英
- Simplified Chinese: 恽代英
Transcriptions
Standard Mandarin
- Hanyu Pinyin: Yùn Dàiyīng

Yun Daiying (August 12, 1895 – April 29, 1931) was an early leader of the Chinese Communist Party.

== Early life ==
In 1913, Yun Daiying entered the private Zhonghua University in Wuchang, and after graduation in 1918, he stayed there as an instructor. In 1919, he participated in the May Fourth Movement in Wuhan. In 1920, he founded the Socialist Youth League of China with Xiao Chunü and others, and in 1921, he joined the Chinese Communist Party as one of the first batch of party members. In 1923, he became an instructor at Shanghai University. In Shanghai, he became a leader of the Communist Youth League of China and the chief editor of the periodical China Youth from 1925 to 1927.

== Political career ==
In 1924, he joined under orders the Kuomintang (First United Front), promoting cooperation between the Communist Party and the Kuomintang. In 1925, he led the May Thirtieth Movement in Shanghai. He went to the Whampoa Military Academy in Canton in 1926, where he became a military instructor in the political department, aiding the work of Zhou Enlai. In the Northern Expedition of July, he stayed in Canton. In September after the North Expedition forces liberated Wuhan, he went to Wuhan to become the chief military instructor of the Republic of China Military Academy. After Chiang Kai-shek and Wang Jingwei launched a purge against the communists in succession in April and July 1927, he was sent to Jiujiang, where he helped organize the Nanchang Uprising.

In the end of 1927, he led the Guangzhou Uprising and was appointed secretary-general of the Canton Soviet Government. After its failure, he fled first to Hong Kong and later to Shanghai. In the end of 1928, he started to direct propaganda work of the communist party, creating the periodical Red Flag. In June 1929, he was elected as a central committee member in the 2nd Plenary Session of 6th Central Committee of the Chinese Communist Party. Due to his opposition to leftist mistakes within the party, he was demoted and appointed communist party council secretary of Shanghai Ludong District.

== Execution ==
On May 6, 1930, he was captured and detained in Shanghai, and later in February 1931, he was detained in Nanjing. Initially, he did not reveal his identity. Right before he was to be rescued out of prison, he was identified and betrayed by Gu Shunzhang. After Chiang Kai-shek's men failed to entice or force surrender, Chiang ordered his execution on April 29.

Before his death, Yun Daiying wrote in prison a poem of martyrdom:

Having roamed far and wide, I recollect old comrades,

Old comrades are immortal regardless of life or death, I've dismissed personal loss, seeing it as negligible,

Preserving my heroic bent albeit serving as prisoner.

== Statue ==
His statue was erected at Central China Normal University.
