= Li Yu (politician) =

Chinese politician

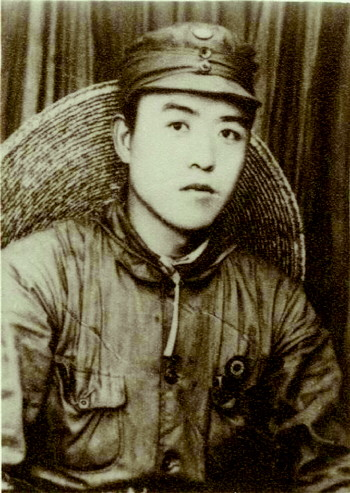
Li Yu in Shandong

Li Yu (Chinese: 黎玉; May 12, 1906 – May 30, 1986), formerly known as Li Xingtang (Chinese: 李兴唐), born in Guo County (now Yuanping), Shanxi Province, was a politician in the People's Republic of China, where he held the positions of Vice Minister of the Eighth Ministry of Machinery Industry and Vice Minister of the Ministry of Agricultural Machinery. He served as an alternate member of the 6th Central Committee of the Chinese Communist Party, and the Third, Fifth, and Sixth Standing Committee of the National Committee of the Chinese People's Political Consultative Conference (CPPCC).

== Biography ==
=== The First Kuomintang-Communist Civil War ===
In his early years, Li Yu was admitted to Guo County Middle School. Following the May Thirtieth Movement in 1925, he organized and led the students in participating in anti-imperialist and patriotic activities on the streets. In July 1926, the underground Chinese Communist Party (CCP) branch was established at Guo County Middle School. Li was introduced to the CCP by Liu Baocui (Chinese: 刘保粹) and Feng Hanying (Chinese: 冯汉瑛) in September 1926. In March 1928, the Kuomintang arrested and detained Li Yu and seven others in Taiyuan No.1 Prison. Li Yu was released on bail and returned home in April 1929. The same year, he was admitted to the Law and Politics College of Peking University (Chinese: 北平大学法政学院).

In October 1930, he was appointed the secretary of the Municipal Working Committee of the CCP Peking Municipal Committee and the minister of staff. He was appointed secretary of the Municipal Working Committee and Minister of Workers of the Beiping Municipal Committee in October 1930. Subsequently, he served as acting secretary of the CCP Tianjin Municipal Committee, secretary of the Shijiazhuang Central County Committee, and secretary of the Zhizhong Special Committee. He was appointed secretary of the CCP Tangshan Municipal Committee in 1933 and was subsequently tasked with the reconstruction of the party organizations that had been devastated in Tangshan. He organized an anti-imperialist strike that involved over 30,000 members of the General Union of the Kailuan Mine at the outset of 1934. Then, he assumed the roles of secretary of the Zhinan Special Committee, inspector of the CCP Hebei Provincial Committee in Zhizhong and Zhinan, and secretary of the Jiluyu Frontier Special Committee.

=== Second Sino-Japanese War ===
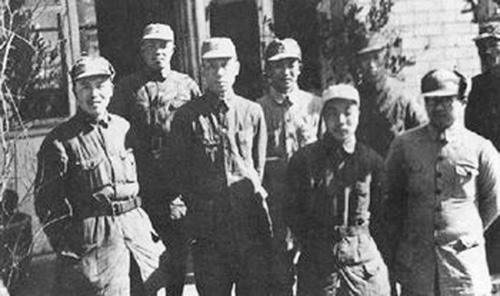
In 1942, Liu Shaoqi came to Shandong to inspect the work. From left: Li Yu, Zhou Changsheng, Liu Shaoqi, Chen Guang, Xiao Hua, Liang Xingchu, Luo Ronghuan.

In 1936, the CCP Central Committee North Bureau (Chinese: 中共中央北方局) dispatched him to Shandong to restore and reconstruct the CCP Shandong Provincial Committee, which had been severely injured by the Kuomintang. He served as the Provincial Committee's secretary. He commanded the Culai Mountain Uprising (Chinese: 徂徕山起义) and served as the political commissar of the uprising forces after the Shandong Provincial Committee launched an anti-Japanese armed uprising following the commencement of the Second Sino-Japanese War. In 1938, he was appointed as a member of the Shandong Branch of the CCP Central Committee and the political commissar of the Shandong Column of the Eighth Route Army. The Column, which was commanded by Zhang Jingwu, was active in the Central and South Shandong and Jiaodong regions and comprised over 40,000 soldiers.

He was appointed director of the Shandong wartime labor executive committee in 1940 and played a role in the establishment of the Shandong anti-Japanese base area. The Military Commission and the CCP Central Committee Secretariat determined in September 1941 that the Shandong sub-bureau would consist of Zhu Rui, Luo Ronghuan, Li Yu, and Chen Guang, with Zhu Rui serving as the secretary. Li assumed the positions of deputy political commissar of the Shandong Military Region, director of the Shandong wartime administrative committee, and deputy secretary of the Shandong sub-bureau of the CCP Central Committee from 1943 onward. He supported Luo Ronghuan in commanding the military and civilians in Shandong to conduct partial and full-scale counterattacks against the Japanese from 1944 to 1945, resulting in the liberation of the vast majority of Shandong, with the exception of a few significant cities, including Jinan and Qingdao.

=== The Second Kuomintang-Communist Civil War ===
The CCP Central Committee relocated the New Fourth Army to Shandong after the Second Sino-Japanese War. In December 1945, the Shandong Branch was reorganized as the East China Bureau of the CCP Central Committee, with Rao Shushi serving as the secretary and Li Yu as the deputy secretary. Rao relocated to Peking in January 1946 to work in the Military Coordination Department shortly after his arrival in Shandong. Li Yu, the deputy secretary of the East China Bureau of the CCP Central Committee in charge of land reform and chairman of the Shandong Provincial Government, headed the land reform movement in the liberated areas of Shandong during Rao's absence from the region. Beginning in January 1947, Rao returned to Shandong and assumed responsibility for the East China Bureau's operations. Rao and Li were embroiled in a bitter dispute regarding the land reform issue, and Rao and Kang Sheng began to criticize Li. Considering the wartime tension at the time, Li elected to endure the criticism himself and preserve the Party's unity. His labor authority was suspended following the Great Lunan Conference, with the exception of his role in support for the front line.

=== The People's Republic of China ===
Shanghai was seized by the Chinese People's Liberation Army in May 1949. Li Yu was dispatched to Shanghai with the CCP East China Bureau and served as a member of the East China Military and Political Committee and Secretary General of the CCP Shanghai Municipal Committee. He was appointed as the director of the Municipal Construction Committee of the Shanghai Municipal People's Government in September 1951 after being withdrawn from the 3rd plenary session of the 7th Central Committee of the Chinese Communist Party (Chinese: 中国共产党第七届中央委员会第三次全体会议) in June 1950 as an alternate member of the Central Committee. He was downgraded to the position of head of the Labor and Wage Division of the Shanghai Municipal Committee on February 29, 1952, and was subsequently withdrawn from the position of Secretary General of the Shanghai Municipal Committee.

Li was transferred to the Central Committee of Finance and Economy in 1953, and in 1954, he was appointed vice minister of the Ministry of First Machinery Industry. From 1959 to 1961, he served as the first executive vice minister and deputy party secretary of the Ministry of Agricultural Machinery (later the Ministry of the 8th Machinery Industry). In 1978, he was appointed as an advisor to the First Ministry of Machinery Industry and a member of the Party Group of the Ministry of Agricultural Machinery. He was persecuted during the Cultural Revolution. He served as an executive member of the Third, Fifth, and Sixth National Committees of the Chinese People's Political Consultative Conference (CPPCC).

Li Yu was vindicated by the CCP Central Committee in March 1986 for his unwarranted criticism of 1948. It revoked the portion of the erroneous conclusions that were made against Li Yu and Lin Hao in the Resolution on Strengthening Discipline by Overcoming the State of Indiscipline and Anarchy within the Party of the Enlarged Meeting of the East China Bureau, and it restored Li Yu's political honor.

Li Yu died in Beijing on May 30, 1986. In October 2012, the CCP Shanghai Municipal Committee reviewed the case of Li's dismissal from his post in Shanghai in 1950s. The committee revoked the decision of the CCP Shanghai Municipal Committee of February 29, 1952, and restored Lai Yu's political reputation.
