= Sun Zhiyuan =

Chinese politician

- 孙志远
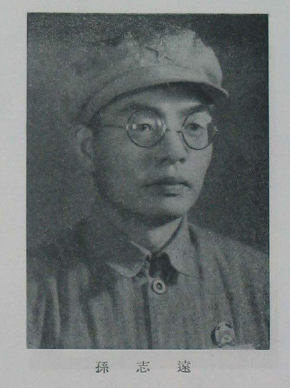
- Sun Zhiyuan

Minister of the Third Machinery Industry
- In office January 1961 – November 1965
- Premier: Zhou Enlai
- Preceded by: Zhang Liankui
- Succeeded by: Chen Huatang

Director of the Counselor's Office of the State Council
- In office December 1952 – November 1954
- Premier: Zhou Enlai
- Preceded by: Liao Luyan
- Succeeded by: Tao Xijin

Secretary-General of the Southwest Military and Political Commission
- In office June 1950 – 1952
- Preceded by: New title
- Succeeded by: Position revoked

Personal details
- Born: October 12, 1911 Ding County, Hebei, Qing China
- Died: 11 October 1966 (aged 54) Beijing, China
- Party: Chinese Communist Party
- Spouse: Zhao Lei
- Children: Li Juyi
- Education: Beiping Normal University; Central Party School of the Chinese Communist Party

Chinese name
- Simplified Chinese: 孙志远
- Traditional Chinese: 孫志遠
Transcriptions
Standard Mandarin
- Hanyu Pinyin: Sūn Zhìyuǎn

Sun Zhiyuan (Chinese: 孙志远; 12 October 1911 – 11 October 1966) was a Chinese politician who served as Minister of the Third Machinery Industry. He was an alternate member of the 8th Central Committee of the Chinese Communist Party. He was a member of the Standing Committee of the 3rd Chinese People's Political Consultative Conference.

== Biography ==
Sun was born Sun Bingzhe (孙秉哲) in Ding County (now Dingzhou), Hebei, on 12 October 1911. In 1929, while studying at Beiping Normal University (now Beijing Normal University), he joined the Communist Youth League of China. In 1930, he became a member of the Chinese Communist Party (CCP), and in November of the same year, he was appointed head of the Organization Department of the Beiping Municipal Committee of the Communist Youth League of China.

=== War of Resistance Against Japan ===
After the September 18 Incident in 1931, he was sent to work in the Counter-Japanese Volunteer Army in Liaoyang, northeast China. In the spring of 1932, he returned to his hometown and served as party secretary of Ding County. In February 1933, he became an instructor in the training class of the Second Cavalry Division of the Northeast Army, and later engaged in military transportation work in the 53rd Army. In August 1934, he was sent to study in Haishenwei. He returned to China in February 1935 and engaged in secret party work in Shenyang, Beiping, and other places. In August 1936, he was dispatched to work at the CCP 53rd Army Working Committee.

After the outbreak of the Second Sino-Japanese War, he was a representative of the People's Self Defense Army in central Hebei province, where he participated in the establishment of the Counter-Japanese Base. In May 1938, he was appointed director of the Political Department of the 3rd Column of the Eighth Route Army and a member of the Standing Committee of the CCP Central Hebei Military District Committee.

In 1940, he enrolled at the Central Party School of the Chinese Communist Party (CCP Central Party School) in Yan'an, and in 1942, he was chosen as deputy director of the Second Department of the CCP Central Party School.

He was deputy director of the Political Department of the Shanxi-Suiyuan Military District in 1943 and subsequently commander of the 3rd Military Division of the Shanxi-Suiyuan Military District and vice president of the Shanxi-Suiyuan Branch of the CCP Central Party School in 1944.

=== Chinese Civil War ===
In 1945, he became political commissar of the 2nd Independent Brigade of the Shanxi-Suiyuan Field Army. In May 1946, he was director of the Political Department and political commissar of the 3rd Column of the Shanxi-Suiyuan Field Army.

In 1947, he was made head of the Shanxi-Suiyuan Land Reform Work Group and secretary of the CCP Jingle County Committee. He was appointed political commissar of the 7th Column of the Northwest Field Army in July 1948 and subsequently political commissar of the 7th Army of the First Field Army in February 1949. In June of the same year, he was made director of the Political Department of the 1st Corps and participated in battles such as Fufeng Battle and Longdong Battle.

=== PRC era ===
After the establishment of the Communist State, in June 1950, he was appointed secretary-general of the Southwest Military and Political Commission. In November 1952, he was transferred to Beijing to serve as deputy secretary-general of the State Council and director of the Counselor's Office. He was director of the 2nd and 3rd Offices of the CCP Central Finance Commission in February 1954 and soon in October he was deputy director of the 3rd Office of the State Council and deputy director of the National Construction Commission. In October 1956, he became deputy director and deputy party branch secretary of the National Economic Commission, and later concurrently served as director of the General Administration of Materials Management. He was minister of the Third Machinery Industry in January 1961, in addition to serving as second secretary of the Party Group of the National Defense Industry Committee and deputy director of the National Defense Industry Office.

On 11 October 1966, he died of an illness in Beijing, at the age of 55.

== Family ==
Sun married Zhao Lei (赵磊), who once served as deputy party secretary of Beijing University of Posts and Telecommunications. Their adopted grandson Li Juyi (李巨一) served as a senior executive at China Merchants Group from 1993 to 2006.

Government offices
New title	Secretary-General of the Southwest Military and Political Commission; 1950–1952	Succeeded by Position revoked
Preceded by Liao Luyan	Director of the Counselor's Office of the State Council; 1952–1954	Succeeded by Tao Xijin
Preceded by Zhang Liankui	Minister of the Third Machinery Industry; 1961–1965	Succeeded by Chen Huatang
