= Political power grows out of the barrel of a gun =

Chinese Communist Party slogan

- Traditional Chinese: 槍桿子裏面出政權
- Simplified Chinese: 枪杆子里面出政权
Transcriptions
Standard Mandarin
- Hanyu Pinyin: qiānggǎnzi lǐmiàn chū zhèngquán

"Political power grows out of the barrel of a gun" (Chinese: 枪杆子里面出政权; pinyin: Qiānggǎnzi lǐmiàn chū zhèngquán) is a phrase and slogan which was coined by Chinese communist leader Mao Zedong. The phrase was originally used by Mao during an emergency meeting of the Chinese Communist Party (CCP) on 7 August 1927. Mao used the phrase following the decimation of CCP ranks by the Nationalist government's White Terror and the beginning of the Chinese Civil War, advocating that the party needed to establish "revolutionary base areas" in the mountains and develop its own military.

== History ==
In April 1927, Chiang Kai-shek broke the First United Front with the Chinese Communist Party (CCP), beginning the White Terror. The Nationalist government arrested, jailed, tortured, and executed tens of thousands of people. CCP membership declined from 60,000 to 10,000 people. Some members, including Mao Zedong, contended that if the CCP were to survive it must develop its own military.

With CCP ranks depleted, Mao advocated that "political power grows out of the barrel of a gun" and that the party should retreat into what it termed "revolutionary base areas" in the mountains. He first used the phrase during an emergency meeting of the CCP on 7 August 1927, during this early phase of the Chinese Civil War.

Mao employed the phrase a second time on 6 November 1938, during his concluding speech at the 6th Plenary Session of the CCP's 6th Central Committee. The speech was concerned with both the Civil War and the Second Sino-Japanese War, which had commenced the previous year.

In 1960, a portion of the 1938 speech was excerpted and included in Mao's Selected Works, with the title "Problems of War and Strategy". However, the central phrase was popularized largely as a result of its prominence in Mao's Quotations from Chairman Mao Tse-Tung (1964).

== Sixth plenary session ==
The 1938 paragraph containing the phrase is reproduced below; the central phrase (in bold), cited as deriving from the 1938 speech via the Selected Works of Mao Tse-Tung:

Communists do not fight for personal military power (they must in no circumstances do that, and let no one ever again follow the example of Zhang Guotao), but they must fight for military power for the Party, for military power for the people. As a national war of resistance is going on, we must also fight for military power for the nation. Where there is naivete on the question of military power, nothing whatsoever can be achieved. It is very difficult for the labouring people, who have been deceived and intimidated by the reactionary ruling classes for thousands of years, to awaken to the importance of having guns in their own hands. Now that Japanese imperialist oppression and the nation-wide resistance to it have pushed our labouring people into the arena of war, Communists should prove themselves the most politically conscious leaders in this war. Every Communist must grasp the truth, "Political power grows out of the barrel of a gun." Our principle is that the Party commands the gun, and the gun must never be allowed to command the Party. Yet, having guns, we can create Party organizations, as witness the powerful Party organizations which the Eighth Route Army has created in northern China. We can also create cadres, create schools, create culture, create mass movements. Everything in Yan'an has been created by having guns. All things grow out of the barrel of a gun. According to the Marxist theory of the state, the army is the chief component of state power. Whoever wants to seize and retain state power must have a strong army. Some people ridicule us as advocates of the "omnipotence of war". Yes, we are advocates of the omnipotence of revolutionary war; that is good, not bad, it is Marxist. The guns of the Russian Communist Party created socialism. We shall create a democratic republic. Experience in the class struggle in the era of imperialism teaches us that it is only by the power of the gun that the working class and the labouring masses can defeat the armed bourgeoisie and landlords; in this sense we may say that only with guns can the whole world be transformed. We are advocates of the abolition of war, we do not want war; but war can only be abolished through war, and in order to get rid of the gun it is necessary to take up the gun.

— Selected Works of Mao Tse-tung, Vol. II, pp. 224-225; transcription by the Maoist Documentation Project, hosted by Marxists Internet Archive.

== See also ==
- Civil control of the military
- No War but the Class War
- Workers of the world, unite!
- Serve the People
- Si vis pacem, para bellum
- War is a continuation of politics by other means
