= 7th Central Committee of the Chinese Communist Party =

The 7th Central Committee of the Chinese Communist Party was in session from 1945 to 1956. It was a product of the convening of the 7th National Congress of the Chinese Communist Party. It held seven plenary sessions in this 11-year period. It began in June 1945, before the end of the Second Sino-Japanese War, and the resumption of the Chinese Civil War. This committee would be succeeded by the 8th Central Committee.

51 individuals served as members while the 7th National Congress elected 33 individuals as alternates.

Its 1st Plenary Session, convened in 1945, elected the 7th Politburo and the 7th Secretariat.

Its second plenary session was held in 1949, at about the same time as the establishment of the People's Republic of China.

== Chronology ==
1. 1st Plenary Session
  - Date: June 19, 1945
  - Location: Yan'an
  - Significance: Mao Zedong was appointed Chairman of the CCP Central Committee, aided by a Secretariat made up by Zhou Enlai, Ren Bishi, Liu Shaoqi and Zhu De. A 13-members Politburo and other central organs were elected.
2. 2nd Plenary Session
  - Date: March 5–13, 1949
  - Location: Xibaipo, Pingshan County
  - Significance: This meeting was held just before the victory over the Kuomintang. Mao Zedong delivered a report focusing on the post-victory activity of the Communist Party, emphasizing the need to guard from "unarmed enemies" and "sugar-covered bullets". The decision to convene the Chinese People's Political Consultative Conference with "democratic parties" was also taken.
3. 3rd Plenary Session
  - Date: June 6–9, 1950
  - Location: Beijing
  - Significance: First meeting of the CCP Central Committee to be held in Beijing and after the nationwide victory. It focused on the Central People's Government work, with reports delivered by Mao Zedong, Liu Shaoqi and Chen Yun. Nie Rongzhen made a report on the reorganization of the People's Liberation Army from guerilla formations towards becoming the armed forces of the new Republic.
4. 4th Plenary Session
  - Date: February 6–10, 1954
  - Location: Beijing
  - Significance: Gao Gang was criticized. Mao Zedong did not participate, and the report by the Politburo was delivered by Liu Shaoqi.
5. 5th Plenary Session
  - Date: April 4, 1955
  - Location: Beijing
  - Significance: The meeting was held after a Party national conference held in March. It approved the conference's resolutions on the Five-Year Plan and expelling Gao Gang (posthumously) and Rao Shushi. Lin Biao and Deng Xiaoping were elected to the Politburo for the first time.
6. 6th Plenary Session
  - Date: October 4–11, 1955
  - Location: Beijing
  - Significance: Resolutions on the collectivization and socialist transformation of agriculture were taken. A decision on the convening of the Party's 8th National Congress was adopted.
7. 7th Plenary Session
  - Date: August 22–September 13, 1956
  - Location: Beijing
  - Significance: Preparations for the 8th Congress were made.
