= Shuai Mengqi =

Chinese politician (1897–1998)

- 帅孟奇
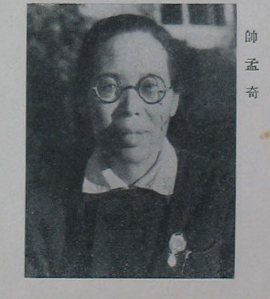
- Shuai Mengqi, photographed c. 1949

Personal details
- Born: January 3, 1897 Hanshou, Hunan, Qing Empire
- Died: 13 April 1998 (aged 101) Beijing, People's Republic of China
- Party: Chinese Communist Party (1926-1975; 1978-1985)

Shuai Mengqi (Chinese: 帅孟奇; pinyin: Shuài Mèngqi; 3 January 1897 – 13 April 1998) was a Chinese politician.

== Early life ==
Shuai Mengqi was born on 3 January 1897 in Hanshou County, Hunan. Her father was a shengyuan and Tongmenghui member who organised local revolutionary demonstrations. At age 20, Shuai married her cousin Xu Zhizhen (许之桢) who became acquainted with Chinese Communist Party (CCP) founders Chen Duxiu and Li Dazhao while studying in Shanghai.

== Career ==
Xu Zhizhen became a CCP member a year after the party's founding conference in 1921 and encouraged Shuai to follow suit; she joined the CCP in 1926, when Xu returned to Hunan and became the Hunan Peasants' Association secretary-general. Shuai was a local county committee leader and staged numerous protests for women while chairing the committee's Women's Department. At the onset of the Chinese Civil War, Shuai fled from Hunan to Wuhan where she frequently corresponded with Hubei CCP members. However, she was separated from Xu; whereas Shuai was sent to Moscow in 1947 for her education, her husband was assigned another Russian city.

Shuai returned to China in 1930 and was politically active in both Shanghai and Jiangsu; she was arrested at the former city in 1932 while staging a women's rally at a cotton mill and sentenced to life imprisonment at a Kuomintang prison in Nanjing. A protracted period of torture in prison left her crippled in the right leg and blind in the right eye; during this time, it was widespread belief among the CCP membership that Shuai had died in prison. Xu remarried in Russia while tragedy befell Shuai's family: her mother was diagnosed with schizophrenia; her father was expelled from Hunan; and her thirteen-year-old daughter was poisoned to death.

After her release from prison in 1937, Shuai moved back to Hunan; appointed as secretary-general of the Workers' Committee and Hunan Provincial Party Committee, she also served as secretary to the local administrations in Changde, Yiyang, and Zhongxin. In 1939, she moved to Yan'an, Shaanxi and was involved in several committees at the seventh National People's Congress, including as secretary-general of the CCP Central Committee's Women's Committee, as minute secretary and general branch secretary for the Central Committee's Agricultural Committee, and as member of the Party Committee's Shaan-Gan-Ning Border Region government.

However, Shuai's life as a distinguished party member abruptly ended in 1966 when, as part of the Cultural Revolution, she was singled out for being a potential traitor and imprisoned for some seven years, during which she was tortured until she was blind in the left eye. Thereafter, Shuai was exiled to Pingxiang, Jiangxi; her CCP membership was officially revoked in 1975, but was reinstated three years later. She was subsequently appointed to the Central Committee's Organisation Department as an advisor. Shuai Mengqi retired from her political career in 1978 at age 88.

== Later years and death ==
Xu Zhizhen died in 1964 aged 71. Shuai never remarried after he left her but single-handedly raised many orphans, some of whom grew up to become notable CCP members. In 1995, Shuai was invited to the fourteenth National People's Congress; at age 95, she was among the oldest attendees. She celebrated her hundredth birthday on 3 January 1997. Shuai Mengqi died at 12:02 local time on 13 April 1998 at age 101; in accordance with her wishes, half of her ashes were scattered at sea in Hanshou County and the remainder under a pine tree at the Babaoshan Revolutionary Cemetery in Beijing.

== In popular culture ==
Zhao Zihui played the eponymous character in the television series Shuai Mengqi (2011) which focuses on Shuai's early political career from 1919 to 1940; the 20-episode series was commissioned by the China Women's Development Foundation and had its launch ceremony at the Great Hall of the People on 26 May 2011.
