= Chen Shaomin =

Chinese Communist Party politician

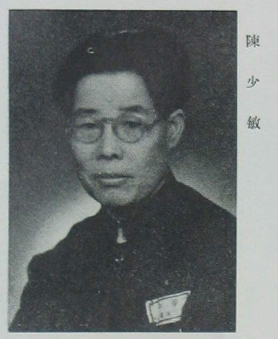

Chen Shaomin (Chinese: 陈少敏; 1902 – 14 December 1977) was a Chinese Communist Party politician.

At the twelfth plenary session of the 8th Central Committee of the Chinese Communist Party in October 1968, Chen was the only delegate to not raise her hand in support of a motion to expel Liu Shaoqi. When questioned by Kang Sheng about her stance, Chen replied "that was my right". As a result, she was persecuted and sent to work on a farm in Henan. She was only allowed to return to Beijing for medical treatment after the death of Lin Biao.
