= 6th Central Committee of the Chinese Communist Party =

Chinese Communist party committee

The 6th Central Committee of the Chinese Communist Party was in session from 1928 to 1945, during most of the Chinese Civil War, and during the Second Sino-Japanese War. It held seven plenary sessions in this period. It was formally preceded by the 5th Central Committee of the Chinese Communist Party. It was the first central committee to have Mao Zedong as a high-ranking member. It was succeeded by the 7th Central Committee.

58 individuals served as members and 34 individuals as alternates.

Its first plenary session elected the 6th Politburo of the Chinese Communist Party in Moscow in 1928, as it would not have been safe to have the session in the Republic of China.

== Chronology ==
=== 1st Plenary Session ===
- Date: July 18, 1928
- Location: Moscow, USSR
- Significance: The meeting was held in Moscow, as the 6th National Congress of the Chinese Communist Party was held there concurrently with the 6th Congress of the Comintern. Xiang Zhongfa was elected General Secretary under Li Lisan's influence; a 14-member Politburo and an 8-member Politburo Standing Committee were appointed as well. Qu Qiubai and Zhang Guotao were elected representatives to the Comintern. Mao Zedong was appointed chairman of the Front Committee, and Zhou Enlai head of the Central Organization Department.

=== 2nd Plenary Session ===
- Date: June 25–30, 1929
- Location: Shanghai
- Significance: The meeting adopted several resolutions on international and internal issues, aligning with the Communist Party of the Soviet Union.

=== 3rd Plenary Session ===
- Date: September 24–28, 1930
- Location: Shanghai
- Significance: Li Lisan's "left opportunist line" was repudiated. Mao Zedong was elected to the Politburo. A Central Soviet Bureau was established, replacing the Front Committee.

=== 4th Plenary Session ===
- Date: January 7, 1931
- Location: Shanghai
- Significance: Wang Ming's line gained the majority, and seizing the cities was proclaimed as the major task of the guerrilla army, against Mao Zedong's idea that the Red Army had to take control the countryside firstly in order to encircle the cities.

=== 5th Plenary Session ===
- Date: January 15–18, 1934
- Location: Ruijin
- Significance: Wang Ming and the "28 Bolsheviks" continued to hold the leadership, opposing any national alliance against Japan (Wang Ming's line was later branded as "left adventurism"). A "Central Secretariat" was established with Bo Gu, Zhang Wentian, Zhou Enlai and Xiang Ying as secretaries.

=== 6th Plenary Session ===
- Date: September 29–November 6, 1938
- Location: Qiao'ergou Catholic Church, Yan'an
- Significance: First meeting held after Mao Zedong was proclaimed leader of the CCP at the Zunyi Conference in 1935, and after the Long March. Mao Zedong delivered a report on the CCP's role in the Second Sino-Japanese War. Several organizational measures were taken. During a closing speech, Mao employed the notable phrase, "Political power grows out of the barrel of a gun", which he had previously coined in August 1927.

=== 7th Plenary Session ===
- Date: May 21, 1944 – April 20, 1945
- Location: Yan'an
- Significance: First meeting after 6 years. Although it officially lasted 11 months, it just held 8 meetings. The Secretariat and the Politburo were suspended and replaced by a Presidium of the 7th Plenary Session, with Mao Zedong as chairman and Zhu De, Liu Shaoqi, Ren Bishi and Zhou Enlai as members. Reports on the Chongqing negotiations and on party urban activity were delivered by Zhou Enlai and Mao Zedong. A Resolution on Certain Questions in the History of Our Party praising Mao Zedong and repudiating Chen Duxiu, Li Lisan and Wang Ming was adopted. Preparations for the Party's 7th National Congress were made, after 17 years since the previous congress.
