= Zhang Dazhi =

Chinese politician (1911–1992)

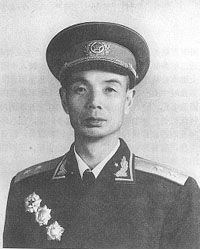

Zhang Dazhi (Chinese: 张达志, April 14, 1911 – January 15, 1992) was a Chinese military officer and politician, lieutenant general of the People's Liberation Army (PLA). He served, most notably, as Commander of the Lanzhou Military Region from 1955 to 1969, and Commander of the PLA Artillery Forces from 1969 to 1977.

== Life ==
Zhang Dazhi was born in Jia County, Shaanxi. In the spring of 1927, he was admitted to the Shaanxi Provincial Fourth Teacher Training School. In March of the same year, he joined the Communist Youth League of China. In the spring of 1928, he graduated as a schoolteacher and began teaching at primary schools, while in February 1929, he became a member of the Chinese Communist Party (CCP). In February 1934, he joined the Chinese Red Army and assisted in the formation of guerrilla detachments in northern Shaanxi, beginning his military career.

He fought in both the Second Sino-Japanese War and the Chinese Civil War, and by 1949 he had risen to become commander of the 4th Army of the First Field Army.

He studied at the Counter-Japanese Military and Political University from 1936 to 1937 and, after the founding of the People's Republic of China, at the Nanjing Advanced Military Academy from 1953 to 1954.

In the early years of the People's Republic, Zhang served as Commander of the paramilitary Public Security Forces in Northwest China. From 1955 to 1969 he commanded the Lanzhou Military Region and from 1969 to 1977 he was Central Commander of the PLA Artillery Forces. His loyalty to Mao Zedong meant that he managed to avoid persecution during the Cultural Revolution.

Zhang also held important positions in the CCP and the political system of the People's Republic:

- member of the Standing Committee of the 4th National People's Congress
- member of the Standing Committee of the National Committee of the 5th Chinese People's Political Consultative Conference
- member of the 9th and 10th Central Committees of the Chinese Communist Party
- member of the Central Advisory Commission

He was awarded numerous military and CCP medals. Zhang Dazhi died on January 15, 1992.
