= Chen Tanqiu =

Chinese politician (1896–1943)

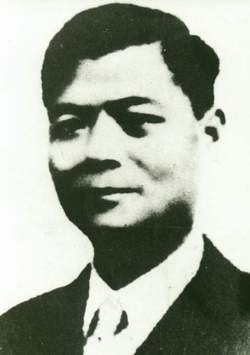
Chen Tanqiu

Chen Tanqiu (Chinese: 陳潭秋; pinyin: Chén Tánqiū; 4 January 1896 – 27 September 1943) was a Chinese politician and founding member of the Chinese Communist Party (CCP).

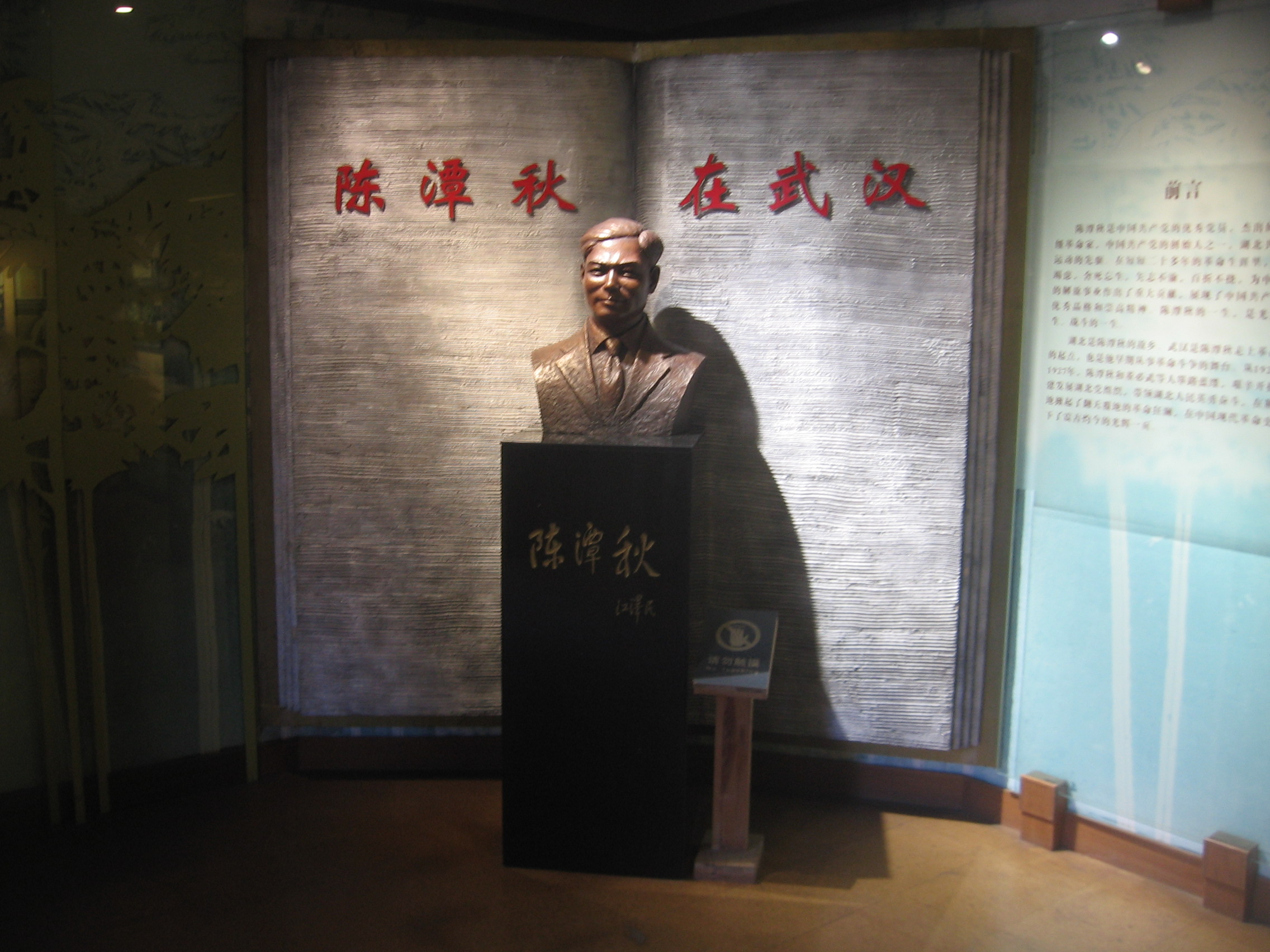
Statue of Chen Tanqiu at the Memorial Hall of the 5th National Congress of the Chinese Communist Party

Chen Tanqiu graduated from Wuhan Higher Normal School (present day Wuhan University) after which he played a leadership role in the May Fourth Movement in 1919. Chen then created the Wuhan Communist group with Dong Biwu in 1920. In 1921, Chen and Dong Biwu went to the meeting that established the CCP, later known as the first National Congress of the Chinese Communist Party.

He and Mao Zemin were arrested by the warlord Sheng Shicai while at Ürümqi, Sinkiang. Chen was executed on September 27, 1943.
