= 8th Central Committee of the Chinese Communist Party =

1956–1969 political body

The 8th Central Committee of the Chinese Communist Party was in session from 1956 to 1969. It was preceded by the 7th Central Committee of the Chinese Communist Party. It held 12 plenary sessions in this period of 13 years. It was the longest-serving central committee ever held by the Communist Party. 115 individuals served as members and 98 individuals served as alternates.

It elected the 8th Politburo of the Chinese Communist Party in 1956. This politburo was dysfunctional from 1967 to 1969. This committee was succeeded by the 9th Central Committee of the Chinese Communist Party.

== Chronology ==
1. 1st Plenary Session
  - Date: September 28, 1956
  - Location: Beijing
  - Significance: Mao Zedong was appointed Chairman of the CCP Central Committee, with Liu Shaoqi, Zhou Enlai, Zhu De and Chen Yun as vice-chairmen and Deng Xiaoping as general secretary. A 23-members Politburo, the 6-members Politburo Standing Committee and other central organs were elected.
2. 2nd Plenary Session
  - Date: November 10–15, 1956
  - Location: Beijing
  - Significance: Liu Shaoqi made a report on the Suez Crisis and the anti-communist revolts in Hungary and Poland; Zhou Enlai made a report on the 1957 economic plan; Chen Yun made a report on food issues. Mao Zedong delivered a closing speech focusing on the relations with the Soviet Union and upholding Joseph Stalin's legacy.
3. 3rd Plenary Session
  - Date: September 20–October 9, 1957
  - Location: Beijing
  - Significance: Deng Xiaoping made a report on the Anti-Rightist Campaign; Chen Yun made a report on State governance and development of agriculture; Zhou Enlai made a report on labor insurances. The Great Leap Forward was first outlined.
4. 4th Plenary Session
  - Date: May 3, 1958
  - Location: Beijing
  - Significance: The meeting approved the report which was to be delivered to the 2nd Session of the Party's 8th National Congress as well as a resolution on the meeting of communist and workers' parties held in Moscow in 1957.
5. 5th Plenary Session
  - Date: May 25, 1958
  - Location: Beijing
  - Significance: The meeting focused on organizational issues, particularly appointing Lin Biao an additional vice-chairman of the CCP Central Committee, and starting the publication of Hongqi with Chen Boda as editor-in-chief.
6. 6th Plenary Session
  - Date: November 28–December 10, 1958
  - Location: Wuchang, Hubei
  - Significance: The people's commune were proclaimed. Mao Zedong decided not propose himself as President of the People's Republic of China to the 2nd National People's Congress, paving the way for Liu Shaoqi.
7. 7th Plenary Session
  - Date: April 2–5, 1959
  - Location: Shanghai
  - Significance: Meeting focused on economic and financial work. Reports were submitted by Bo Yibo, Li Xiannian, Deng Xiaoping and Li Fuchun.
8. 8th Plenary Session
  - Date: August 2–16, 1959
  - Location: Lushan
  - Significance: Also known as "Lushan Conference", a debate on the Great Leap Forward occurred. In the end, Peng Dehuai (who criticized the Leap and the people's commune) was accused of being a counter-revolutionary and removed along with other Party leaders like PLA Chief-of-Staff Huang Kecheng and former General Secretary Zhang Wentian. The plenary meeting followed a central conference started on July 2.
9. 9th Plenary Session
  - Date: January 14–18, 1961
  - Location: Beijing
  - Significance: Chen Yun made a report on the 1961 economic plan; Deng Xiaoping made a report on the 1960 Moscow meeting of communist parties. Regional bureaux of the CCP Central Committee were established at this session.
10. 10th Plenary Session
  - Date: September 24–27, 1962
  - Location: Beijing
  - Significance: The meeting repeated Mao Zedong's assessment that Chinese economy was to take agriculture as basis to develop industry. The session's official communique also started to outline Mao Zedong's "theory of continued revolution under proletarian dictatorship" which led to the Cultural Revolution.
11. 11th Plenary Session
  - Date: August 1–12, 1966
  - Location: Beijing
  - Significance: First plenary meeting after 4 years. It approved the Decision of the Central Committee of the Chinese Communist Party Concerning the Great Proletarian Cultural Revolution, setting the course for the Cultural Revolution, which had started in May. The Politburo Standing Committee was expanded from 7 to 11 members, with Lin Biao as the single vice-chairman and Liu Shaoqi severely demoted.
12. 12th Plenary Session
  - Date: October 13–31, 1968
  - Location: Beijing
  - Significance: Liu Shaoqi—the main target of the Cultural Revolution—was condemned as "renegade, traitor and scab" and expelled from the Party. A decision to convene the Party's 9th National Congress (after 12 years since the 8th Congress) was adopted.
