= Lin Boqu =

Chinese politician and poet (1886–1960)

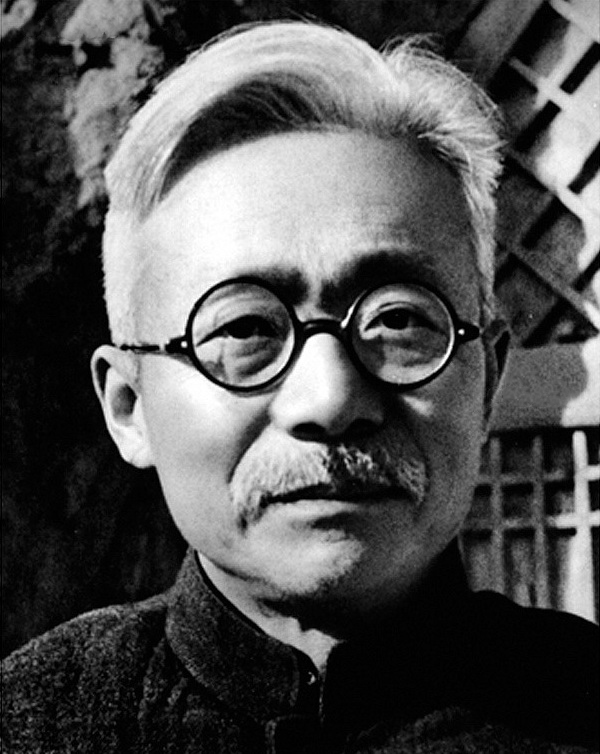
Lin Boqu in 1941

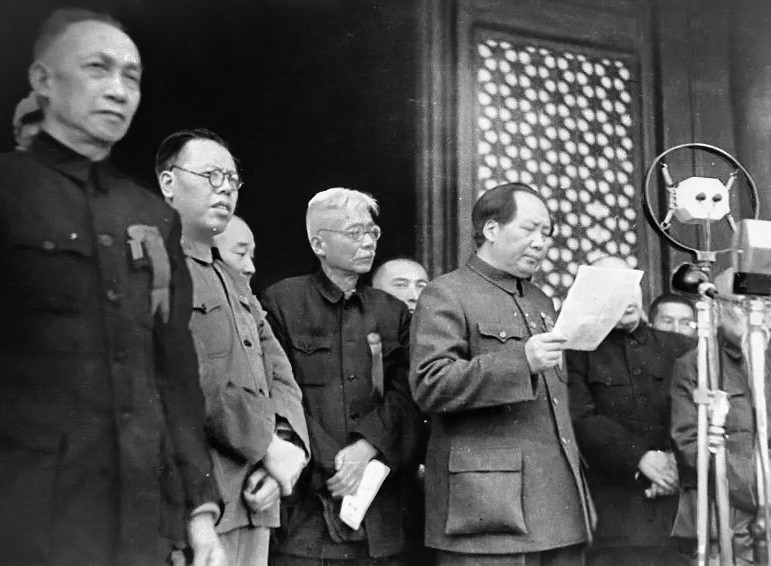
Lin standing behind Mao during the founding ceremony of the People's Republic of China in 1949

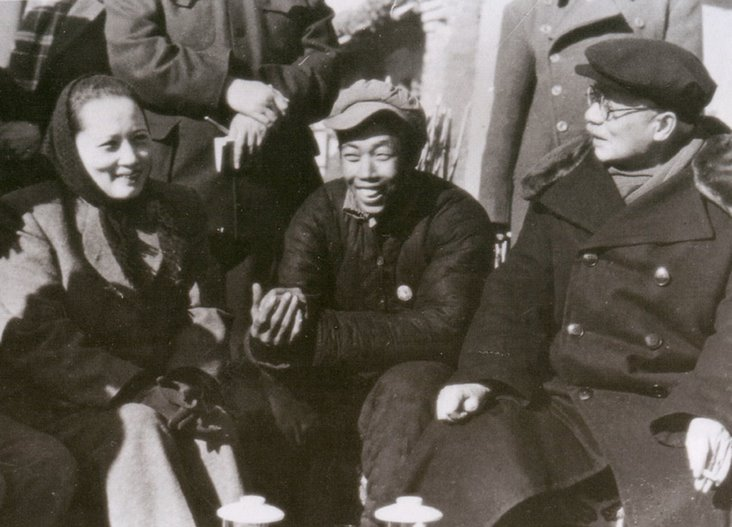
Lin on one of his many inspection tours, here accompanied by Soong Ching-ling

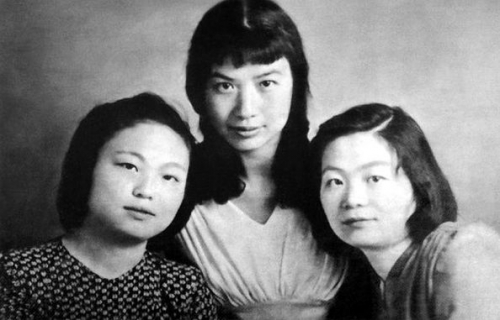
Lin's daughters and Sun Weishi: Lin Lin (left), Lin Li (right)

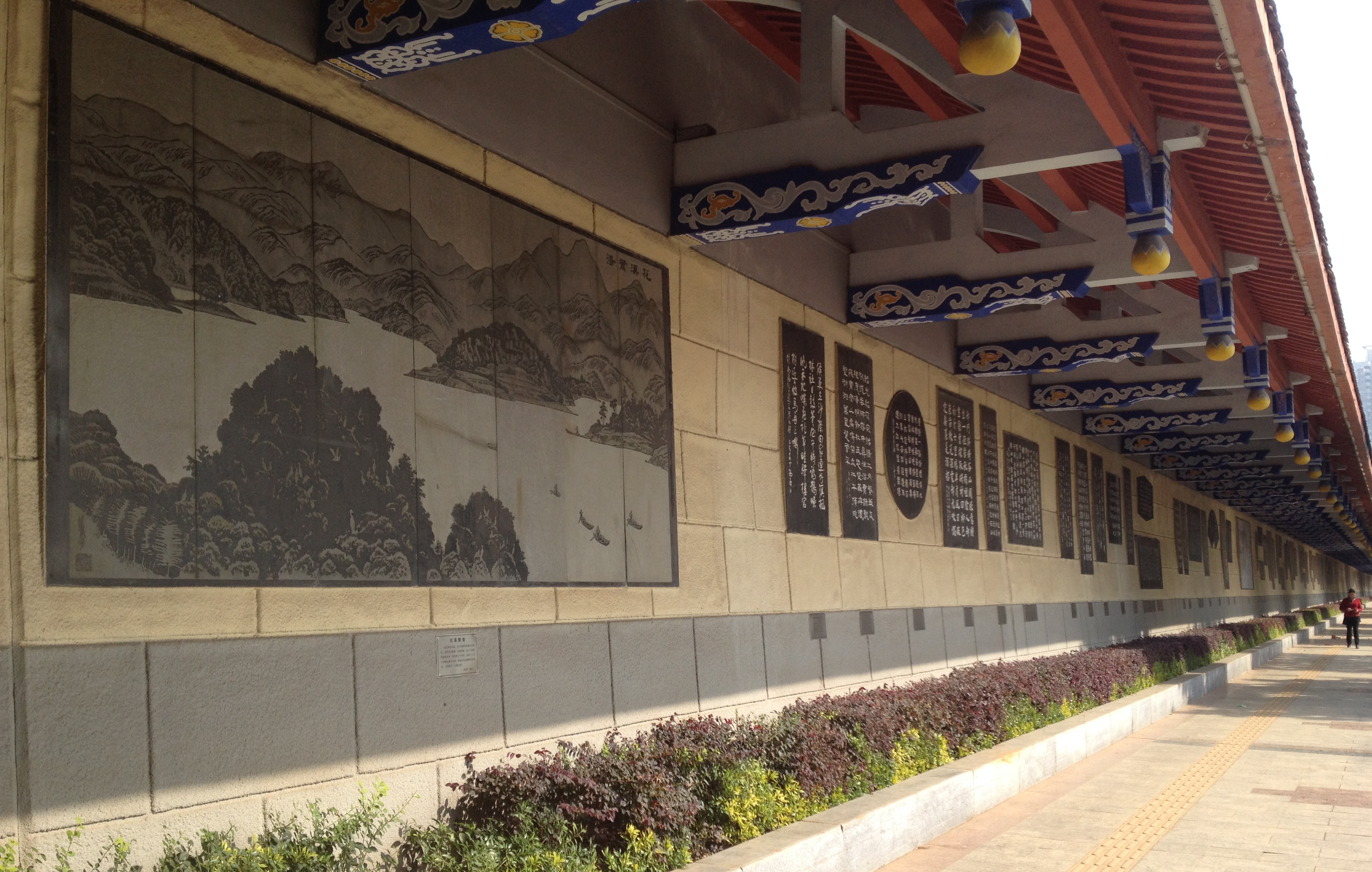
Changde Poetry Wall in Lin's hometown

Lin Boqu (Chinese: 林伯渠; Pinyin: Lín Bóqú; Wade-Giles: Lin Po-ch'u; March 20, 1886 – May 29, 1960) was a Chinese politician and poet. An early supporter of Sun Yat-sen and member of the Tongmenghui, as well as a later participant in the Nanchang Uprising and the Long March, Lin came to be seen as one of the elder statesmen of the Chinese Communist Party.

On October 1, 1949, Lin presided over the Communist Party's victory ceremony in Tiananmen Square, and stood on the right-hand side of Mao Zedong as he proclaimed the foundation of the People's Republic of China.

== Biography ==
Lin Boqu, born Lin Zuhan (林祖涵), was raised in a rural family in a village near Changde, Hunan, and received a state grant to study in Tokyo at the age of 16. There, he joined the Tongmenghui, the revolutionary group founded by Sun Yat-sen. After returning to China, Lin worked as a school teacher, before he was recruited to the Dongbei region for revolutionary work on behalf of the Tongmenghui. After the fall of the Qing dynasty, Lin found himself persecuted by the Yuan Shikai regime, and was forced to escape to Japan, where he joined Sun Yat-sen's newly formed Chinese Revolutionary Party (later to become the Kuomintang). Returning to China again, he joined the Communist Party in 1921.

Throughout the first half of the 1920s, Lin continued working with the Kuomintang in different capacities, most significantly as Minister of Agriculture. Eventually shifting his allegiances to the communists, he took part in the Nanchang Uprising in 1927. Shortly afterwards, he left China for a six-year stay in the Soviet Union, where he studied at the Moscow Sun Yat-sen University. He returned in late 1933, and became active in the Jiangxi Soviet, serving as Minister of Finance and presiding over the Council of Agriculture. After taking part in the Long March, he resumed his duties as Minister of Finance from Yan'an and was also elected Chairman of the Shaanxi-Gansu-Ningxia Border Region. In this period, Lin came to be known as one of the Five Elders of Yan'an (Chinese: 延安五老), along with Dong Biwu, Xu Teli, Wu Yuzhang, and Xie Juezai.

Due to his seniority and early allegiance to Sun Yat-sen, Lin was often drawn upon as a resource for diplomatic needs with the Kuomintang. In 1936, he assisted Zhou Enlai in the negotiations with Chiang Kai-shek during the Xi'an Incident, and in the alliance that followed generally helped to facilitate the United Front against the Japanese. In February 1944, Lin traveled to Chongqing for negotiations with the Nationalist government, and in April 1949, he was again paired with Zhou Enlai for peace talks with Kuomintang general Zhang Zhizhong in Beijing. As the preparations for the formation of the People's Republic of China were underway in the latter half of 1949, Lin was appointed Secretary General of the Central People's Government Committee. In that role, he presided over the founding ceremony of the new nation on October 1, 1949 - sometimes referred to as the "host" of the celebrations.

After the foundation of the PRC, Lin took up a variety of positions, though preferred to stay out of the political limelight. In September 1954, he was elected Vice Chairman of the Standing Committee of the National People's Congress. In the years that followed, he undertook lengthy inspection tours of primarily rural provinces, beginning with his native Hunan and continuing to Guangxi, Jiangxi, Hubei, Shanxi, Inner Mongolia, and Ningxia.

Lin died in a Beijing hospital on May 26, 1960. In a memorial poem, Marshal Chen Yi eulogized him as "a hero always upholding the correct line in his glorious revolutionary career." Lin's fellow "Yan'an Elder" Dong Biwu memorialized his friend in two poems following his passing, focusing more on the personal than the political. Deng Xiaoping gave the following tribute, highlighting the breadth of Lin's experience as well as the depth of his contribution: "He [went] through three historical stages: the old democratic revolution led by the bourgeoisie, the new democratic revolution led by the proletariat, and the socialist revolution. In every stage of the revolution, he was a complete revolutionary and made an indelible contribution to the liberation of the Chinese people."

Lin is buried at the Babaoshan Revolutionary Cemetery in Beijing, along with other first-generation CCP leaders such as Zhu De, Ren Bishi, Peng Dehuai, and Chen Yun.

== Posthumous purge ==
Lin was posthumously purged during the Cultural Revolution for allegedly opposing the marriage between Mao and Jiang Qing during the Yan'an years. As a result, he was removed from his iconic spot in the official portrait of the 1949 foundation ceremony, like Gao Gang and Liu Shaoqi before him. He was not restored to the painting until 1979.

== Family and personal life ==
Lin was married four times and had eight children. One of his marriages was to Zhu Ming in May 1945. After Lin's death in 1960 she killed herself in 1961 following her identification as the author of an anonymous letter about Jiang Qing.

His youngest son, Lin Yongsan (林用三), was elected to the Eleventh National Committee of the Chinese People's Political Consultative Conference in 2008, and has served in a variety of government posts. Lin's daughter Lin Li studied with Zhou Enlai's adopted daughter Sun Weishi in Moscow, and was later imprisoned for seven years during the Cultural Revolution for supposed associations with Li Lisan.

According to his niece, Lin was a personal friend of Sun Yat-sen, and was with Dr. Sun when he died.

== Poetry ==
Lin was an avid poet, composing prolifically throughout his life. According to the curator of his museum, he wrote over a thousand poems. His work has been published in Chinese as Lin Boqu Collection and Selected Poems of Lin Boqu. His poem "The Dream of Going Back Home" can be found prominently inscribed on the two-mile long Poetry Wall in his hometown of Changde, listed in the Guinness Book of World Records as the longest wall with engraved arts in the world.
