= Chen Yu (politician) =

Chinese politician (1901–1974)

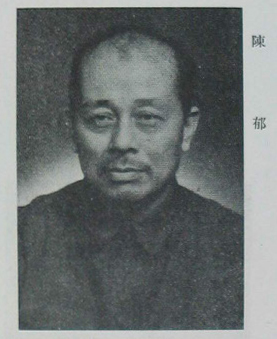
- Born: November 11, 1901; Chenwuwei (陈屋围), Xin'an County (Modern-day Nanshan Village (南山村), Nanshan District, Shenzhen)
- Died: March 21, 1974 (aged 72); Guangzhou
- Occupation: Politician
- Known for: Governor of Guangdong from 1957 to 1967

Chen Yu (Chinese: 陈郁, 11 November 1901 – 21 March 1974) was a Chinese politician. He served as the Minister of Fuel Industries, and was the Governor of Guangdong province from 1957 to 1967.

Political offices
Preceded by Tao Zhu	Governor of Guangdong; 1957–1967	Succeeded by Huang Yongsheng
