= Wu Yuzhang =

- 吴玉章
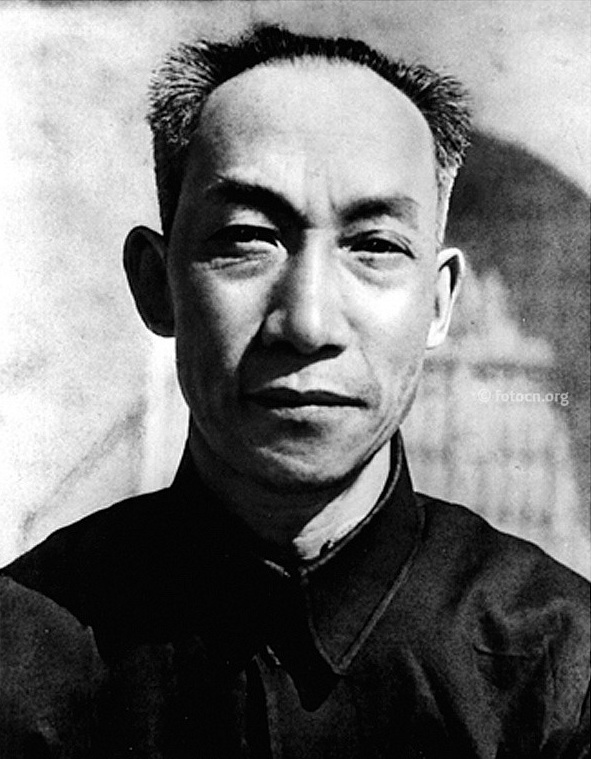
- Born: 30 December 1878; Shuangshi, Sichuan, Qing Empire
- Died: 12 December 1966 (aged 87); Beijing, People's Republic of China
- Movement: Railway Protection

Academic background
- Education: Tokyo Shinbu Gakko
- Revolutionary struggle
- Resistance: Tongmenghui

Wu Yuzhang (simplified Chinese: 吴玉章; traditional Chinese: 吳玉章; pinyin: Wú Yùzhāng; given name Yongshan (Chinese: 永珊; pinyin: Yǒngshān); December 30, 1878 – December 12, 1966) was a Chinese politician, educator, and president of Renmin University of China from 1950 to 1966.

== Biography ==
Wu was born in Rong County, Sichuan in 1878. He joined the Chinese Communist Party in 1925. He founded Jialing High School in Nanchong, Sichuan in 1927, and in 1950, under the auspices of Hu Yaobang, merged it with the private Jianhua Middle School founded by Mr. Zhang Lan to form the Northern Sichuan Public Nanchong High School, which is the predecessor of Sichuan Nanchong Senior High School. In the 1940s, when he was in Yan'an, he and Dong Biwu, Lin Boqu, Xu Teli, Xie Juezai were called as Yan'an Five Seniors (延安五老).

== Legacy ==
The Wu Yuzhang Honors College, an honors college within Sichuan University, was named in honor of Wu.

Academic offices
Preceded by none	President of Renmin University of China; 1950 – 1966	Succeeded by Cheng Fangwu
