= Xiao Hua (general) =

Chinese general (1916–1985)

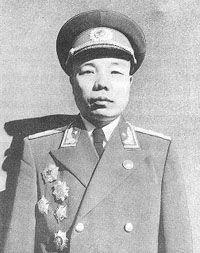
- Born: January 21, 1916; Xingguo, Jiangxi, China
- Died: August 12, 1985 (aged 69) Beijing, China
- Allegiance: China
- Branch: People's Liberation Army
- Service years: 1930–1985
- Rank: Colonel General
- Conflicts: Northern Expedition, Long March, Hundred Regiments Offensive, Chinese Civil War
- Awards: Order of Bayi (1st Class Medal); Order of Independence and Freedom (1st Class Medal); Order of Liberation (China) (1st Class Medal)

Xiao Hua (萧华 or 肖华; January 21, 1916 – August 12, 1985), also known as Xiao Yizun (萧以尊), was a general of the Chinese People's Liberation Army. He was a Hakka from Xingguo County, Jiangxi Province.

== Second Sino-Japanese War ==
After the Second Sino-Japanese War began, he served as deputy director of the Political Department of the 115th Division of the Eighth Route Army.
