= 7th National Congress of the Chinese Communist Party =

1945 Chinese Communist Party conference

7th National Congress of the Chinese Communist Party 中国共产党第七次全国代表大会
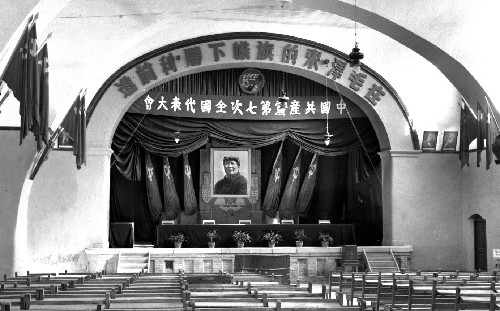
- Seventh Congress Hall
- Begins: April 23, 1945
- Ends: June 11, 1945
- Location: Yan'an
- Previous event: 6th National Congress of the Chinese Communist Party (1928)
- Next event: 8th National Congress of the Chinese Communist Party (1956 & 1958)
- Participants: 544 representatives
- Major events: Election held to form the 7th Central Committee of the Chinese Communist Party
- Leader: Mao Zedong (Leader of the Chinese Communist Party)

The 7th National Congress of the Chinese Communist Party was convened from April 23 to June 11, 1945, in Yan'an, Shaanxi. It took place near the end of the Second Sino-Japanese War during a period of uneasy truce between the Kuomintang and Communist parties, with each maintaining their headquarters in different regions of China. It was preceded by the 6th National Congress and followed by the 8th National Congress.

== Discussions and reports ==
During the 7th National Congress, Mao Zedong delivered his April 1945 report On the Coalition Government which expanded on the principles of New Democracy he had formulated in his earlier essay On New Democracy.

During the Congress, Mao described the Chinese Communist Party's guerilla warfare as "sparrow tactics":

In the early phase of the War of Resistance Against Japanese Aggression, our prowess was like that of a little finger. How did we grow our prowess? With sparrow warfare, guerilla warfare. Sparrows fly wherever they can find food ... Even though sparrows are opportunists that follow food, even though they are little, when you add them up, they amount to 910,000 strong. Will we be sparrows forever? Long live the sparrow? History has proven that our sparrow is no ordinary sparrow; it can grow into an eagle. In ancient Chinese mythology, there is an eagle that can fly from the North Sea to the South Sea with one swoop of its wings. We will be like that too and grow to three million, five million. Our little sparrow will grow into an eagle swooping up all of China with its wings.

Mao also used the fable of The Foolish Old Man Removes the Mountains in a speech. The foolish old man and his sons are engaged in the seemingly impossible task of removing two mountains, but the gods are touched by their resoluteness and have the mountains carried away. In Mao's speech, he contended:

Today, two big mountains lie like a dead weight on the Chinese People. One is imperialism and [the] other is feudalism. The Communist Party has long made up its mind to dig them up. We must persevere and work unceasingly, and we, too, will touch god's heart. Our god is none other than the masses of the Chinese people. If they stand up and dig together with us, why can't these two mountains be cleared away?

Mao's re-telling of The Foolish Old Man Removes the Mountains was later included in the Three Constantly Read Articles and Quotations from Chairman Mao Zedong, in which it is the only text reproduced in its entirety rather than excerpted.

== Other ==
The Party passed its 1945 constitution at the 7th National Congress. The 1945 constitution was the first to incorporate Mao Zedong Thought, which it incorporated into the preamble.

The "five great secretaries in the Central Secretariat" (Mao, Zhu De, Liu Shaoqi, Zhou Enlai, and Ren Bishi) were elected by the Central Committee.

The White-Haired Girl was first performed in April 1945 in Yan'an as a tribute to the Seventh National Congress.
