= Bao Huiseng =

Chinese politician

- 包惠僧
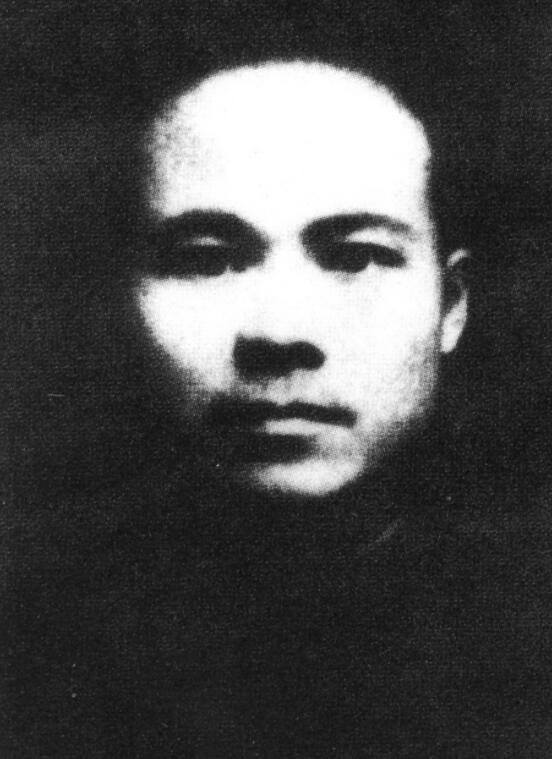

Personal details
- Born: January 15, 1895 Huanggang, Hubei, Qing Dynasty
- Died: July 2, 1979 (aged 84) Beijing, China
- Party: Chinese Communist Party (1921–1979); Kuomintang (1923–1948)
- Spouse(s): Ding Xuejiao, Xia Songyun, Xie Jinyun

Bao Huisheng (Chinese: 包惠僧; January 15, 1895 – July 2, 1979), also known as Daoxiang, Huisheng, and using the pseudonyms Bao Yide, Bao Yiyu, and Bao Sheng, was a Chinese political figure who engaged in the workers' movement. A native of Huanggang, Hubei, he was a member of the 1st National Congress of the Chinese Communist Party and a counselor of the State Council of China.

== Biography ==
On January 15, 1895, Bao Huisheng was born in Baojiafan, Shangbahe, Huanggang, Hubei. His father, Bao Cunjia, was a scholar and a candidate for the position of provincial governor, but he later resigned and returned to his hometown to farm. Because of his father's obstruction, he was only able to start his studies at the age of six and enter a private school, where he studied under Xiong Jichang. At the age of nine, he transferred to Shuangtang to study under Qiu Jiepu. In 1909, he was admitted to Huangzhou Higher Primary School, during which time he began to come into contact with Sun Yat-sen's theories and learned about his fellow townsmen from Huanggang, such as Xiong Shili and Li Siguang.

After the 1911 Revolution, he left for Wuchang and was helped by Yao Jinqi, the then Director of Education, to apply for the Hubei Provincial First Normal School. In 1917, he graduated from the First Normal School and worked as a secretary in the affiliated primary school. In 1918, he went to teach at Bahe Primary School but encountered trouble again and left for Wuchang again. He began to contribute articles to local newspapers such as the Da Han Bao to make a living. In the spring of 1919, he became a reporter for the newspaper and audited classes in the Chinese Department of Peking University. After the May Fourth Movement, he returned to Wuhan to interview people from all walks of life about the movement to boycott Japanese goods, as well as the movements of provincial councilors such as Cai Jimin, Bai Wenwei, and Tang Keming. Later, he lived with Chen Tanqiu in Wuhan and met Dong Biwu.

In January 1920, he went to Beijing and Tianjin to interview Zhou Enlai and other movement leaders. The following month, he returned to Wuhan to visit Chen Duxiu, who was lecturing at Wuhan Wenhua University. Afterwards, he went to several news agencies. Dissatisfied with the propaganda for Wang Zhanyuan, He Peirong and others, he and several friends, including Chen Tanqiu, decided to change the provincial assembly. He also went to the French concession of Hankou to visit Xiong Jinhuai to discuss organizing the Hubei Citizens' Election Supervision Group to rectify the political atmosphere. In July, he met his classmates by chance at Snake Hill and learned about Yun Daiying of Liqun Bookstore. He also met Liu Bochui. In August, he was introduced by Liu Bochui to Dong Biwu, Zhang Guoen, Li Hanjun, Li Qihan and others to establish the Wuhan Communist Group and served as the group secretary. After the group was established, they conducted investigations in various factories in Wuhan to understand the living conditions of workers. The Shanghai Communist Group decided to recruit Yun Daiying and Liqun Bookstore, and Bao Huisheng was responsible for coordination. Under the organization of Li Hanjun, he met Mamaev, a member of the Bolshevik Far Eastern Bureau of the Communist International, and accepted his suggestion to study in Moscow.

He arrived in Shanghai on the eve of the Spring Festival in 1921, but Grigori Voitinsky had already returned to his country and he could not go to Russia to study for the time being due to lack of funds. So he stayed in Shanghai and worked with Li Hanjun and Yang Mingzhai to take charge of the work of the Shanghai group. On May 1, the Shanghai group held a meeting at Tianhou Palace, which led to a search by the police. Bao Huisheng was instructed by Li Hanjun to go to Guangzhou to report to Chen Duxiu. After arriving in Guangzhou, he was kept by Chen Duxiu and helped the Guangzhou group members Tan Pingshan, Chen Gongbo, Tan Zhitang and others with their work. In July, Bao Huisheng and Chen Gongbo went to Shanghai as representatives of Guangzhou to attend the founding meeting of the Chinese Communist Party. On the 20th, he arrived in Shanghai and settled in Shanghai Bowen Girls' School, where he lived with Zhou Fohai. On the 23rd, the First National Congress was held, and the chairman of the meeting was elected and the situation in various places was introduced. On the 27th, he moved to Nanhu to discuss the content of the party program, the labour movement plan and the declaration. After the meeting, he worked with Zhang Guotao to organize the Secretariat of the Chinese Labor Union to publish the weekly "Labor". From then on, he began to be at odds with Zhang Guotao. He also went south to meet Chen Duxiu, who was being escorted back to Shanghai to take charge of the work, at the suggestion of Comintern representative Henk Sneevliet. After returning to Shanghai, he was searched and detained by French police for 5 days.

=== February 7 Strike ===
In early winter, he returned to Wuhan to preside over party affairs. Together with Huang Fusheng, Chen Tanqiu, Liu Zitong and others, he used the Shizhong Bookstore and the Yuehan Workers' Club in Xujiapeng as activity bases to develop party groups and trade unions. In November, he met Zhang Tailei and Henk Sneevliet to visit Sun Yat-sen in Guangzhou and promoted cooperation between Kuomintang and the Communist Party. In early December, rickshaw workers in the Hankou concession went on strike against rent increases. Bao Huisheng and Shi Yang spoke out for the workers. In mid-December, he went north to Kaifeng to help the Longhai Railway strike, but by the time he arrived, the workers' demands had already been agreed upon by the Ministry of Communications, and he failed to achieve the previous effect of developing workers. Through the introduction of Longhai Railway workers, he organized workers on the Zhengzhou part of the Beijing-Hankou Railway and fought for their rights. He quickly organized the Beijing-Hankou Railway Jiang'an Workers' Club and the Zhengzhou Workers' Club, and thus met Xiang Ying.

In the spring of 1922, Mao Zedong launched a strike in Changsha. Zhao Hengti ordered his arrest and he took refuge in the Wuchang Party Headquarters, where he lived with Bao Huisheng. In July, he was transferred to work at the Beijing Transportation Department of the CCP. After the Second National Congress, he served as the secretary of the Beijing District Party Committee. In January 1923, the Beijing-Hankou Railway General Union was preparing to be established. On the 28th, Wu Peifu ordered the prohibition of the establishment of the General Union. Despite the mediation and negotiation of Li Zhenying and Yang Defu, the founding meeting on February 1 could not be held. In June, the General Union held a demonstration and launched a strike. On the 7th, Wu Peifu sent military police to suppress the striking workers. Afterwards, Bao Huisheng and Liu Zitong and others went to Beijing to carry out political propaganda and jointly submitted a proposal to the National Assembly, but it failed to pass.

=== National Revolution ===
In June 1923, cooperation between the Kuomintang and the Communist Party began with the 3rd National Congress of the Chinese Communist Party, and Bao Huisheng was introduced to the Kuomintang by Li Dazhao. In October, he returned to Wuhan to work for the Wuhan District Committee of the CCP and was elected chairman. In February 1924, the Wuhan District Committee was abolished and replaced by the Hankou District Committee. In May, he went to Shanghai to attend the enlarged meeting of the Central Executive Committee. In the summer, due to the raid on the two district committees in Wuhan, he was forced to go to Shanghai and then south to Guangzhou, where he worked in the Propaganda Department of the Kuomintang Central Party Headquarters and taught part-time at the National Guangdong University and the Yunnan Army Cadre School. In early February 1925, he took over as director of the Political Department of the Whampoa Military Academy and served as party representative of the Third Regiment of the First Division of the Party Army, participating in the two Eastern Expeditions.

On March 20, 1926, after the Canton Coup, he and Fu Weiyu decided to continue to support Chiang Kai-shek's leadership and strive for his leftward shift. On July 9, the Northern Expedition began, and he served as the party representative of the 22nd Division of the National Revolutionary Army, partnering with Qian Dajun. In August, he went to Shanghai to prepare to study in Moscow, but failed again, and returned to Guangzhou with Zhan Dabe. On October 10, the Northern Expeditionary Army conquered Wuhan, and Bao Huisheng went north to the Wuhan Headquarters to meet with Deng Yanda and prepare for the establishment of the Wuhan Central Military and Political School.

In January 1927, he served as the party representative of the 14th Independent Division of the National Revolutionary Army, responsible for training tasks, and partnered with Xia Douyin. After the purge of the party, in May, Xia Douyin switched sides, Bao Huisheng was detained, and later escaped. After the Ning-Han merger, he was instructed by Zhou Enlai to take over the work of the Jiangxi Military Commission in Nanchang, but unfortunately fell ill and stayed temporarily in Gaoyou and Shanghai. In Shanghai, he broke away from the CCP party organization along with Li Da, Shi Cuntong, and Ma Zhemin. He lost his job as a professional revolutionary and his finances became increasingly difficult, so he made a living by running a newspaper for He Yaozu.

=== National Government ===
In 1931, he became a staff member of He Chengjun, the head of the Wuhan Headquarters of the National Government, and later rose to the position of advisor to the General Headquarters of the Army, Navy and Air Force. After the September 18 Incident, he was transferred by Chiang Kai-shek to serve as secretary of the Military Commission and concurrently as a political instructor at the Central Military Academy. In 1935, Yang Jie, the deputy chief of staff, concurrently served as chairman of the Air Defense Commission and was transferred to the Air Defense Commission. In 1936, he became a civilian and served as an advisor to the Ministry of the Interior. In 1944, he became the director of the Household Registration Department. In 1947, the Household Registration Department was expanded into the Population Bureau, and he continued to serve as its director.

=== Return to the Communist Party ===
In 1948, he moved to Guangzhou with the Republic of China government. The Population Bureau was downsized twice, and Bao Huisheng resigned and went to Macau. In November 1949, he returned to Beijing from Macau. In 1950, he went to study at the Political Research Institute of the North China Revolutionary University. After graduating in December, he was assigned to work in the Ministry of the Interior. In April 1957, he was transferred to the State Council as a counselor. He died in Beijing on July 2, 1979.
