= History of the Chinese Communist Party =

The history of the Chinese Communist Party began with its establishment in July 1921. A study group led by Peking University professors Chen Duxiu, together with a group of people around him such as Li Dazhao, Li Hanjun, Yu Xiusong, and Shi Cuntong to discuss Marxism along with Communist International support, led to the official founding of the Chinese Communist Party (CCP) in July 1921.

In 1923, the founding father of the Republic of China Sun Yat-sen invited the CCP to form a United Front, and to join his nationalist party, the Kuomintang (KMT), in Canton for training under representatives of the Communist International, the Soviet Union's international organization. The Soviet representatives reorganized both parties into Leninist parties. Rather than the loose organization that characterized the two parties until then, the Leninist party operated on the principle of democratic centralism, in which the collective leadership set standards for membership and an all-powerful Central Committee determined the party line, which all members must follow.

The CCP grew rapidly in the Northern Expedition (1925–1927), a military unification campaign led by Sun Yat-sen's successor, Chiang Kai-shek. The party, still led by urban intellectuals, developed a radical agenda of mass mobilization, labor organization, rural uprisings, anti-imperialism, and national unification. As the Northern Expedition neared success, Chiang in December 1927 unleashed a White Terror that virtually wiped out the CCP in the cities.

Nevertheless, Mao Zedong, whose Autumn Harvest Uprising had been a spectacular failure in mobilizing local peasants, became the leader of the CCP and established rural bases in Yan'an and the Jinggang Mountains. To protect these bases, he also formed the Chinese Red Army and engaged in prominent military campaigns such as the Long March. During the Second Sino-Japanese War (1937–1945) Mao led a rectification campaign to emphasize Maoism and solidify his leadership of the party and after the war, he led the CCP to victory in the Chinese Civil War (1945–1949) and established the People's Republic of China (PRC).

In the years after 1949, the structure of the CCP remained Leninist, but the CCP's style of leadership changed several times.

== Origins of the CCP (1905–1922) ==
=== Before the First Congress ===
Flag of the Chinese Communist Party

Flag of the Chinese Communist Party before the 1990s

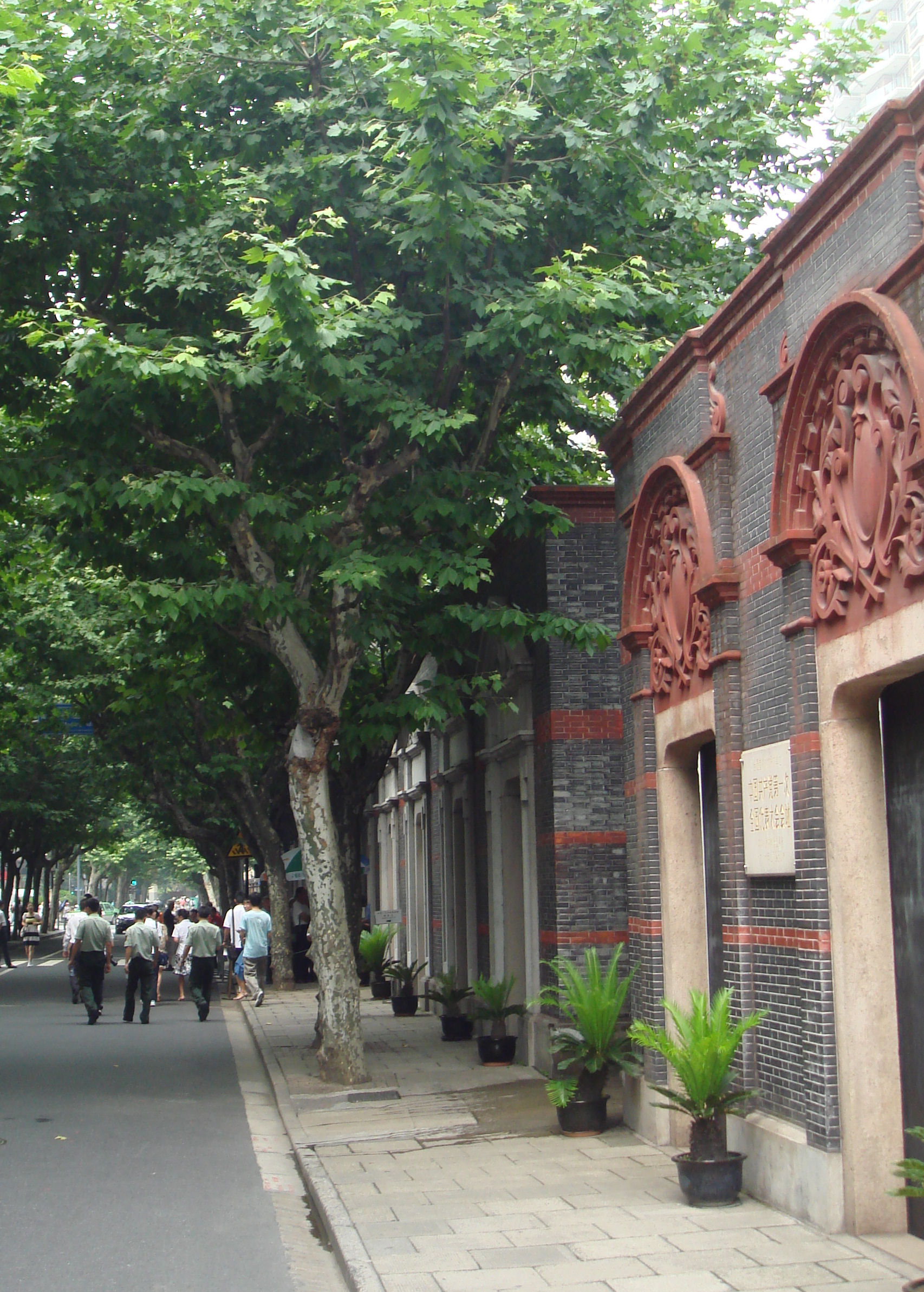
Location of the 1st National Congress of the Chinese Communist Party in July 1921, on Xintiandi, former French Concession, Shanghai.

Marxist and socialist ideas began spreading among Chinese intellectuals in the late Qing dynasty. as Chinese intellectuals began studying the work of European philosophers. One of the earliest Chinese promoters of Marxism was Zhu Zhixin, a revolutionary author and close colleague of Sun Yat-sen who in 1905 introduced and translated excerpts of The Communist Manifesto into Chinese. Sun Yat-Sen was also an early proponent of certain socialist ideals, arguing that the doctrine of Minsheng incorporated elements of socialism and communism, or People's Livelihood, an idea centered around the taxation of land. The CCP still claims ideological continuity with Sun Yat-Sen, viewing him as a precursor to the Chinese communist movement and one of the founders of their movement. Sun stated, "Our Principle of Livelihood is a form of communism". His widow, Soong Ching-ling, was named Honorary President of the People's Republic of China in 1981.

Following the 1919 May Fourth Movement, communism began to gain traction in China. During 1919 and 1920, reading groups focused on the study of Marxism began to develop in China, with participants who had been involved in political movements of the 1910s like Chen Duxiu and Li Dazhao, as well as younger activists including Mao Zedong.

In the summer of 1919, the Russian Communist Party (Bolsheviks) decided to assist people of the Far East by establishing the Far Eastern Bureau of the Communist International. In April 1920, a Soviet Communist International (Comintern) agent Grigori Voitinsky was one of several sent to China, where he met Li Dazhao and other reformers. While in China, Voitinsky financed the founding of the Socialist Youth Corps. Voitinsky founded the Far Eastern Bureau of the Comintern at Shanghai. On 5 July, he attended a meeting of Russian communists in China to promote the establishment of the CCP. He helped Chen found the Shanghai Revolutionary Bureau, also known as the Shanghai Communist Group. Numerous Comintern agents went to China to help the Chinese and Koreans establish communist groups. Voitinsky provided these groups with promotional conference and study abroad expenses.

In November 1920, Voitinsky, working with Chen Duxiu and others, issued The Chinese Communist Party Manifesto and started a monthly publication called The Communist Party. Voitinsky left the Republic of China in early 1921, prior to the founding meeting in July 1921.

In early June 1921, two Comintern representatives, Vladimir Neumann, known as Nikolsky, and Dutch national Henk Sneevliet, known as Maring, arrived in Shanghai, and urged Li Da to call various communist cells in the country to come together for a national-level meeting to form a communist party.

=== First Congress ===
The CCP's first formal meeting took place on July 23, 1921, when 13 Chinese representatives of local groups, totaling 57 members, who had met over the course of the preceding two years gathered in Shanghai. The site of the meeting was the residence of Li Hanjun in the Shanghai French Concession at 106 Rue Wantz (now 76 Xingye Road).

After several days of meeting, security concerns prompted the group to instead meet on a houseboat on lake in nearby Zhejiang. The General Assembly adopted The First Program of the Communist Party of China, stating that "the Party is to be named the Communist Party of China" and specifying its objectives: "to overthrow the power of the capitalist class[,]" to "eradicate capitalism and private ownership of property[,]" and to "join the Comintern." The key delegates in the congress were Li Dazhao, Chen Duxiu, Chen Gongbo, Tan Pingshan, Zhang Guotao, He Mengxiong, Luo Zhanglong and Deng Zhongxia.

Mao Zedong was present at the first congress as one of two delegates from a Hunan communist group. Other attendees included Dong Biwu, Li Hanjun, Li Da, Chen Tanqiu, Liu Renjing, Zhou Fohai, He Shuheng, Deng Enming. Comintern representatives Henk Sneevliet and Vladimir Neumann, commonly known as Nikolsky, also attended the meeting.

In addition to Sneevliet's role in introducing Leninist organizational models, academic Tony Saich identifies other significant factors in the CCP's establishment, including: (1) the belief by many Chinese intellectuals that Marxism offered novel solutions to China's problems, (2) Chinese Marxists became on-the-ground activists as opposed to only theorists, (3) the Marxist study circles in China had strong interpersonal bonds, and (4) these tight-knit groups developed a consensus that Leninist organizational models were necessary for cohesion and to resist external pressures.

The period of the CCP's development between 1921 and 1934 is often referred to as the "Communist International era" because the Soviet Union was the key sponsor of CCP activities.

== First United Front (1922–1927) ==
In the early 1920s, the Bolsheviks and the Communist International's leaders believed that in China, the Kuomintang should be supported as it was in their view the country's most viable progressive force. In August 1922, Sneevliet called a surprise special plenum of the central committee. During the meeting Sneevliet proposed that party members join the Kuomintang on the grounds that it was easier to transform the Nationalist Party from the inside than to duplicate its success. Li Dazhao, Cai Heshen and Gao Yuhan opposed the motion, whereupon Sneevliet invoked the authority of the Comintern and forced the CCP to accept his decision.

Under the guidance of the Comintern, the CCP was reorganized along Leninist lines in 1923, in preparation for the Northern Expedition. The Northern Expedition was intended to unify China under a single government. The nascent party was not held in high regard. Karl Radek, one of the five founding leaders of the Comintern, said in November 1922 that the CCP was not highly regarded in Moscow. Moreover, the CCP was divided into two camps, one led by Deng Zhongxia and Li Dazhao on the more moderate "bourgeois, national revolution" model and the other by Zhang Guotao, Luo Zhanglong, He Mengxiong and Chen Duxiu on the strongly anti-imperialism side.

Comintern agent Mikhail Markovich Borodin negotiated with Sun Yat-sen and Wang Jingwei the 1923 KMT reorganization and the CCP's incorporation into the newly expanded party. CCP cadres would join the KMT while remaining under CCP discipline. In 1923, the parties were the two largest political parties in China, with the KMT having several thousand members and the CCP almost a hundred members.

Borodin and General Vasily Blyukher (also known as Galen in Chinese) worked with Chiang Kai-shek to found the Whampoa Military Academy. Soviet advisors were the academy's instructors. The academy produced officers who later became leaders of both the Nationalist forces and the Chinese Red Army.

The CCP's reliance on the leadership of the Comintern provided a strong indication of the First United Front's fragility.

The CCP's first major involvement in large-scale urban worker militancy was the May Thirtieth Movement. The movement also resulted in major growth for the party, with its membership growing from 1,000 members in May 1925 to more than 57,000 by 1927. Local communist organizations also expanded rapidly.

The growth of the CCP after the May Thirtieth Movement also created organizational challenges and disagreements within party leadership. Some leaders, such as Peng Shuzhi and Chen Duxiu advocated for centralizing party authority. Others, such as Cai Hesen and Qu Qiubai, advocated for the party to allow greater flexibility to local bodies.

== Chinese Civil War (1927–1937) ==
In 1927, the KMT broke the United Front, committing the Shanghai Massacre and violently suppressing the CCP. CCP leaders sought to respond with armed uprisings in Nanchang and Changsha, which briefly seized power before being defeated by KMT forces. CCP cadres fled urban areas and, in southern China, led their small armies to establish a base at Jinggangshan.

During this period (1927–1930), the CCP shifted from its focus on the Bolshevik-style of urban revolution and focused on rural revolution. Mao Zedong began establishing a reputation as military leader and peasant organizer. His successes with local figures in Jinggangshan provided him with significant room for political maneuver.

The Chinese Red Army developed the support of local leaders, which helped it become integrated into the local communities. It left Jiaggangshan following the Kuomintang's counterinsurgency campaigns and moved into the Jiangxi-Fujian border region to establish the Jiangxi–Fujian Soviet.

The 1929 Gutian Congress was important in establishing the principle of party control over the military, which continues to be a core principle of the party's ideology. In the short term, this concept was further developed in the June 1930 Program for the Red Fourth Army at All Levels and the winter 1930 Provisional Regulations on the Political Work of the Chinese Workers and Peasants Army (Draft), which formally established CCP control of the military.

By the early 1930s, the political center of the Communist movement had shifted to the rural base areas. In 1931, the CCP consolidated a number these base areas into a state, the Chinese Soviet Republic (CSR). The CSR reached its peak in 1933. It governed a population which exceeded 3.4 million in an area of approximately 70,000 square kilometers. The CSR had a central government as well as local and regional governments. It operated institutions including a court system, and education system. The CSR also issued currency.

=== Long March ===
Although various counter-insurgency campaigns by the Kuomintang failed to defeat the CSR, the fifth encirclement campaign succeeded. The CCP had to give up their bases and started the Long March (1934–1935) to search for a new base.

In January 1935, the Red Army reached Zunyi. At the Zunyi conference, party leadership addressed the events leading to the defeat of the CSR, the overall state of revolution in China, and how to proceed. The course set by previous leaders including Bo Gu, international advisor Otto Braun, Li Lisan, and Qu Qiubai were the subject of criticism. Although Zhou Enlai was among the criticized leaders, he remained respected and continued to hold a leadership position. Mao Zedong was elected to the Standing Committee of the Political Bureau and became the movement's most influential leader. Mao's elevation also reflected a theoretical shift and strategic shift to an increased focus on the rural peasantry as the primary revolutionary class.

After the Zunyi conference, the Long March resumed. The Red Army settled in Shaanxi to expand an existing base into the Yan'an Soviet.

The Western world first got a clear view of the main base of the Chinese Communist Party through Edgar Snow's Red Star Over China. Snow was also the first person to present Mao as the main leader – he was previously seen as just a guerilla leader and mostly as second to Zhu De (Chu Teh).

During this period, young people dominated the CCP from its lowest to its highest levels. According to Snow, the average age of Red Army rank-and-file soldiers was nineteen as of 1936. The CCP's highest-ranking leaders had been students during the May Fourth period and were thus in their mid-thirties or forties after more than a decade of leadership.

== World War II and the Second United Front (1937–1945) ==
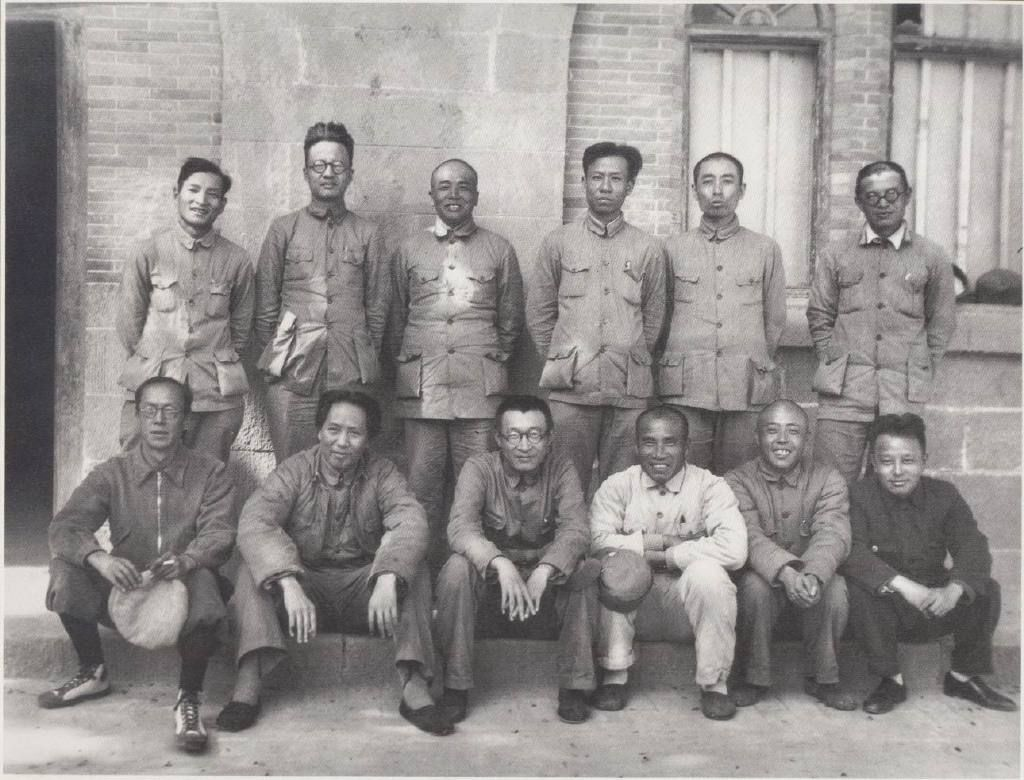
CCP leadership in 1938. Front row, left to right: Kang Sheng, Mao Zedong, Wang Jiaxiang, Zhu De, Xiang Ying, Wang Ming. Back row, left to right: Chen Yun, Bo Gu, Peng Dehuai, Liu Shaoqi, Zhou Enlai, Zhang Wentian

During the Second Sino-Japanese War (1937–1945), the CCP and the KMT were temporarily in an alliance so they could fight against their common enemy. The Yan'an Soviet moved its headquarters from Bao'an (Pao An) to Yan'an (Yenan) in December 1936. The Chinese Workers' and Peasants' Red Army became army groups belonging to the national army (8th route army and New 4th Army), and the Soviet Republic of China changed its name to the Shaan-Gan-Ning Border Region. However, essentially the army and the region controlled by CCP remained independent from the KMT's government.

In eight years, the CCP's membership increased from 40,000 to 1,200,000 and the size of its military forces increased – from 30,000 to approximately one million in addition to more than one million members of militia support groups. It remained a primarily rural party, with its non-rural presence generally limited to the suburbs of major cities.

== China under Mao (1946–1976) ==
After the conclusion of World War II, the civil war resumed between the Kuomintang and the CCP. Although the CCP participated in the National Constituent Assembly, due to the attacks by the Nationalist government, the party was officially banned by the Nationalist government in June 1946, with party leaders including Mao Zedong wanted.

Despite initial gains by the KMT, they were eventually defeated and forced to flee to off-shore islands, most notably Taiwan. In the war, the United States supported the Kuomintang and the Soviet Union supported the CCP, but both to limited extent. With the KMT's defeat and retreat to Taiwan, Mao Zedong proclaimed the People's Republic of China in Beijing on 1 October 1949 before a crowd at Tiananmen Square.

At the time of the PRC's establishment, the CCP had 1 million members. The CCP headed the Central People's Government. From this time through the 1980s, top leaders of the CCP (like Mao Zedong, Lin Biao, Zhou Enlai and Deng Xiaoping) were largely the same military leaders prior to the PRC's founding. As a result, informal personal ties between political and military leaders dominated civil-military relations.

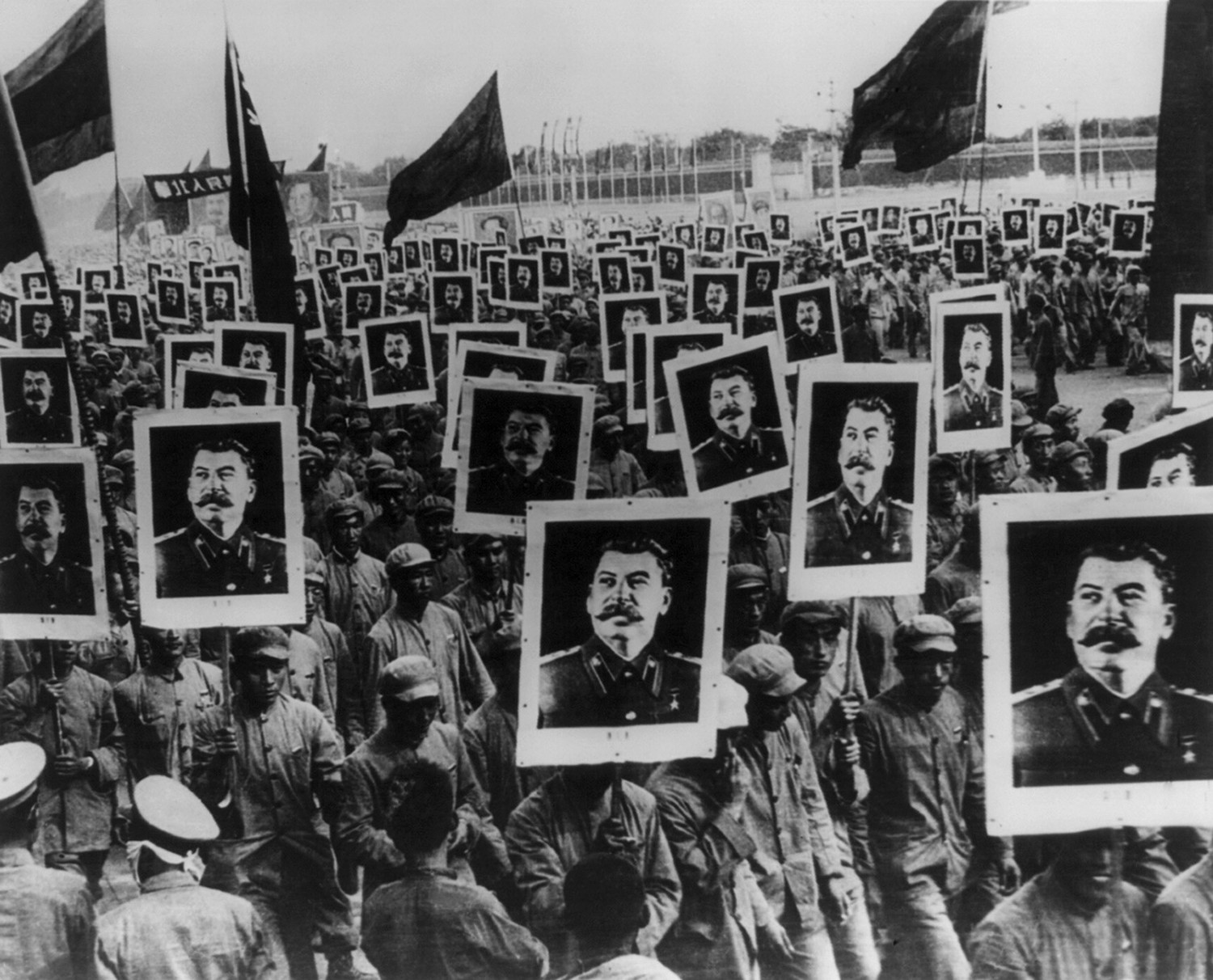
Chinese communists celebrate Joseph Stalin's birthday, 1949.

Soviet leader Joseph Stalin proposed a one-party state when Liu Shaoqi visited the Soviet Union in 1952. In 1954, the PRC constitution was enacted, which changed the previous coalition government and established the CCP's sole ruling system.

During the 1960s and 1970s, the CCP experienced a significant ideological separation from the Communist Party of the Soviet Union. By that time, Mao had begun saying that the "continued revolution under the dictatorship of the proletariat" stipulated that class enemies continued to exist even though the socialist revolution seemed to be complete, leading to the Cultural Revolution in which millions were persecuted and killed.

== Reform and opening up (1976–2012) ==
=== Hua Guofeng ===
Following Mao's death in 1976, a contest for power between CCP chairman Hua Guofeng and Vice-chairman Deng Xiaoping developed. Mao had designated Hua as his successor.

An important aspect of the contest over power arose in the ideological controversy involving Hua's slogan of the Two Whatevers ("We will resolutely uphold whatever policy decisions Chairman Mao made and unswervingly follow whatever instructions Chairman Mao gave"). Deng criticized this idea as being contrary to the tenets of Marxism and emphasized Mao's method of seeking truth from facts to contend that "only through practice can the correctness of one's ideas be proved, and there is no other way of testing truth."

=== Leadership of Deng Xiaoping ===
Deng won the struggle, and became the "paramount leader" in 1978. Deng, alongside Hu Yaobang and Zhao Ziyang, spearheaded the reform and opening up, and introduced the ideological concept of socialism with Chinese characteristics, opening China to the world's markets. In reversing some of Mao's "leftist" policies, Deng argued that a socialist state could use the market economy without itself being capitalist. While asserting the political power of the CCP, the change in policy generated significant economic growth. The new ideology, however, was contested on both sides of the spectrum, by Maoists as well as by those supporting political liberalization. With other social factors, the conflicts culminated in the 1989 Tiananmen Square protests and massacre. The protests having been crushed, Deng's vision on economics prevailed, and by the early 1990s the concept of a socialist market economy had been introduced. In 1997, Deng's beliefs (Deng Xiaoping Theory), were embedded in the CCP constitution.

In 1980, Deng called for a rejuvenation of the cadre system via promotion of "revolutionary, younger, more educated, and more technically specialized" cadre. Subsequent regulations included establishing a cadre retirement system, age limits for leading cadres, and new recruitment and promotion rules. The CCP also implemented the "third echelon" policy. The policy sought to promote a total of 135,000 younger officials at all levels to prepare for the retirement for the impending retirement of older leaders in 1985.

Flag of the Chinese Communist Party from 17 June 1951 to 21 July 1996

=== Leadership of Jiang Zemin and Hu Jintao ===
CCP general secretary Jiang Zemin succeeded Deng as "paramount leader" in the 1990s, and continued most of his policies. Since Jiang's administration, the highest positions in the party-state (General Secretary, Chair of the Central Military Commission, and President of China) have all been simultaneously held by a single leader.

In the 1990s, the CCP transformed from a veteran revolutionary leadership that was both leading militarily and politically, to a political elite increasingly regenerated according to institutionalized norms in the civil bureaucracy. Leadership was largely selected based on rules and norms on promotion and retirement, educational background, and managerial and technical expertise. There is a largely separate group of professionalized military officers, serving under top CCP leadership largely through formal relationships within institutional channels.

In 1991, the party launched the nationwide Patriotic Education Campaign. The major focus of the campaign was within education, and text books were revised to reduce narratives of class struggle and to emphasize the party's role in ending the century of humiliation.As part of the campaign, Patriotic Education Bases were established, and schools ranging from primary to the college levels were required to take students to sites of significance to the Chinese Communist Revolution.

As part of Jiang Zemin's legacy, the CCP ratified the Three Represents for the 2003 revision of the party's constitution, as a "guiding ideology" to encourage the party to represent "advanced productive forces, the progressive course of China's culture, and the fundamental interests of the people." The theory legitimized the entry of private business owners and bourgeois elements into the CCP. Hu Jintao, Jiang Zemin's successor as general secretary, took office in 2002. Unlike Mao, Deng and Jiang Zemin, Hu laid emphasis on collective leadership and opposed one-man dominance of the political system. The insistence on focusing on economic growth led to a wide range of serious social problems. To address these, Hu introduced two main ideological concepts: the Scientific Outlook on Development and Harmonious Socialist Society.

== Xi Jinping and the new era (2012–present) ==
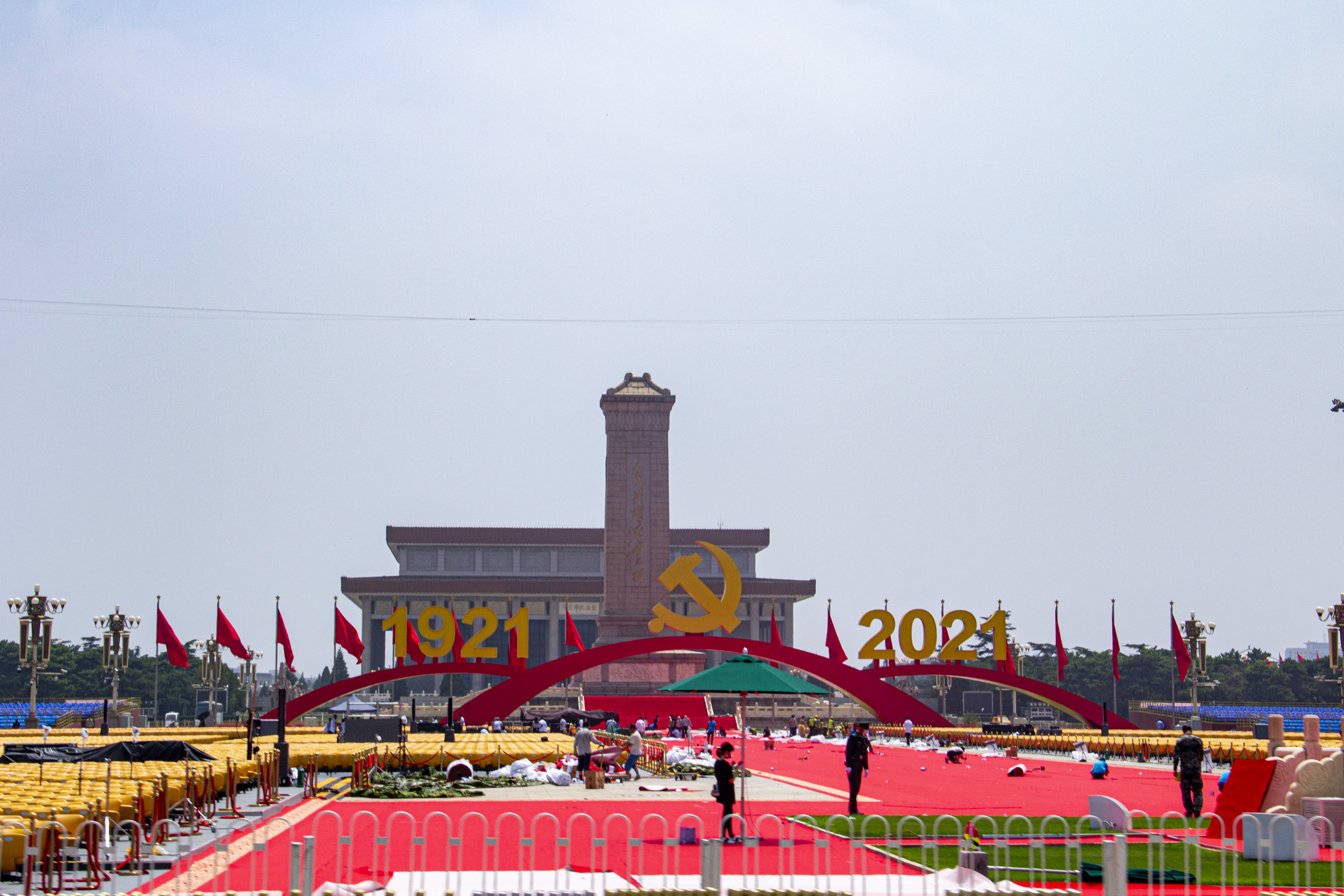
The scenery of decorations at Tiananmen Square on 30 June 2021 to celebrate the 100th anniversary of the CCP's founding

Hu resigned from his post as CCP general secretary and Chairman of the CMC at the 18th National Congress held in 2012, and was succeeded in both posts by Xi Jinping. Since taking power, Xi has initiated a wide-reaching anti-corruption campaign, while centralizing powers in the office of CCP general secretary at the expense of the collective leadership of prior decades. Commentators have described the campaign as a defining part of Xi's leadership as well as "the principal reason why he has been able to consolidate his power so quickly and effectively." Xi's leadership has also overseen an increase in the CCP's role in China. Since 2014, the CCP has led efforts in Xinjiang that involve the detention of more than 1 million Uyghurs and other ethnic minorities in re-education camps, as well as persecution that some characterized as a genocide or crimes against humanity.

Xi has added his ideology, named after himself, into the CCP constitution in 2017. The Party Congress declared that China and the CCP entered a "new era of socialism with Chinese characteristics" in 2012. Celebrations of the 100th anniversary of the CCP's founding, one of the Two Centenaries, took place on 1 July 2021. In the sixth plenary session of the 19th Central Committee in November 2021, the CCP adopted a resolution on the Party's history, which for the first time credited Xi as being the "main innovator" of Xi Jinping Thought while also declaring Xi's leadership as being "the key to the great rejuvenation of the Chinese nation". In comparison with the other historical resolutions, Xi's one did not herald a major change in how the CCP evaluated its history. After the 20th National Congress of the Chinese Communist Party held in 2022, Xi Jinping was re-elected as the CCP general secretary for a third term, that made Xi the first CCP leader since Mao Zedong to be chosen for a third term.

== See also ==
- History of China
- History of the Republic of China
- History of the People's Republic of China
- List of campaigns of the Chinese Communist Party
- Politics of China
- History of communism
- History of the Communist Party of the Soviet Union
- History of the Communist Party of Vietnam
- Soviet and communist studies
- Criticism of communist party rule
