= Chen Wangdao =

Chinese scholar and educator

Chen Wangdao 陳望道
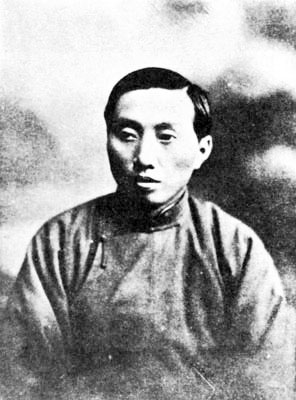
- Chen Wangdao
- Born: 18 January 1891; Yiwu, Zhejiang, Qing dynasty
- Died: 12 October 1977 (aged 86)
- Occupations: scholar, writer, educator

Chen Wangdao (Chinese: 陳望道; pinyin: Chén Wàngdào; Wade–Giles: Ch'en Wang-tao) (1891–1977) was a Chinese scholar and educator. He is recognized as the first and only person to translate the Communist Manifesto into Chinese completely so far. He also served as president of Fudan University from 1949 to 1977.

Chen was born Mingrong (明融) in 1891, while Wangdao is his courtesy name. Beginning in 1915, he studied at Waseda University, Toyo University and Chuo University successively. He eventually obtained his Bachelor of Laws at Chuo University. The experience in Japan brought him into contact with communist ideas.

Chen returned to China as the May Fourth Movement began. He found a job teaching Chinese literature at then Chekiang Provincial No.1 Normal School. Meantime, Chen spread the New Culture with colleagues whose passions coincided with his own. The authority decided to dismiss them for that method. Despite students' agitation against the order, he was obliged to return to his hometown in 1920.

Chen was among the founders of Shanghai's Marxist research institute in May 1920. In August of that year, he became one of the founders of the Shanghai Communist Group.

In 1920, The Communist Manifesto was printed and distributed in Chinese, with its publishing being a major priority of the Shanghai Communist Group. Chen Wangdao is credited as translator of the first printing. It quickly became a popular text among Chinese intellectuals. It was dubbed "the first red book of China."

Later, he set up a group on the communist campaign in Shanghai, together with Chen Duxiu, Li Hanjun et al. He became a member of the Chinese Communist Party (CCP), after it was founded in 1921. He was at odds with Chen Duxiu soon. He left the CCP in 1922 and rejoined in 1957.

Chen edited the anthology Personal Essays and Cartoons, which had been commissioned by the literary journal Venus. Published in 1935, the text was a significant milestone in the developing legitimacy of manhua (cartoons).
