= Grigori Voitinsky =

Russian communist official (1893–1953)

- Григорий Войтинский
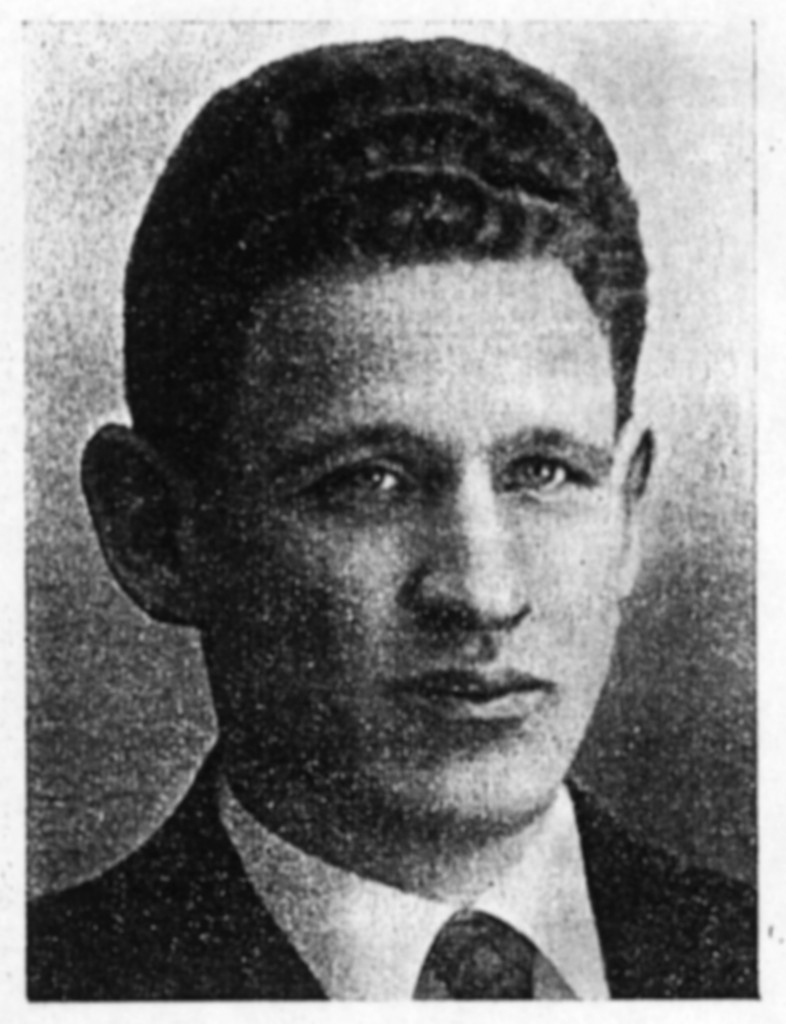

Representative of the Far Eastern Bureau of the Communist International

Personal details
- Born: Grigori Zarkhin; 17 April 1893 Nevel, Vitebsk Governorate, Russian Empire
- Died: 11 June 1953 (aged 60) Moscow, Russian SFSR, Soviet Union
- Party: Communist Party of the Soviet Union (CPSU); Socialist Party of America

Grigori Naumovich Voitinsky, born Zarkhin (Russian: Григорий Наумович Войтинский; 17 April 1893 – 11 June 1953) was a Soviet Communist International (Comintern) official. At age 27, he was sent to the Republic of China in 1920 by the Comintern to contact top prominent Chinese revolutionaries such as Chen Duxiu and establish the infrastructure for a communist party, just before the founding of the Chinese Communist Party (CCP). Voitinsky is considered to be a "chief architect" in founding the CCP.

== Early life and revolutionary activity ==
He was born as Grigori Naumovich Zarkhin on 17 April 1893 in Nevel to a Russian Jewish family. Voitinsky graduated from school in 1907 and worked as a typesetter and accountant. In 1913, he moved to the United States to find employment and joined the Socialist Party of America. After five years living in the United States and Canada, he returned to Russia in the spring of 1918 and he joined the Communist Party of the Soviet Union in Vladivostok. He took an active part in the Far Eastern Front in the Russian Civil War. In 1919, he would be imprisoned by the White Army and sent to Alexandrovsk-Sakhalinsky. By February 1920, he was freed from prison. Allowing him to serve as the deputy leader of northern Sakhalin's provisional executive committee until its occupation by the Japanese.

== Work in the Republic of China ==
In 1920, the Soviet Union established the Far Eastern Bureau of the Communist International in Siberia. It was directly responsible for managing the establishment of a communist party in the Republic of China and other countries in the region. Soon after the bureau's establishment, Vladimir Vilensky-Sibiryakov sent Voitinsky to China as its representative. Voitinsky arrived in Beijing in April 1920 under the guise of journalist (with the name Wu Tingkang in Chinese) and contacted Li Dazhao. Li arranged for Voitinsky to meet with another communist leader, Chen Duxiu, in Shanghai. Yang Mingzhai served as Voitinsky's interpreter and traveling companion. In Shanghai, Voitinsky helped to found the Socialist League in August 1920 and funded the translation and dissemination of propaganda materials such as The Communist Manifesto.

The Shanghai Chronicle (not to be confused with the Shanghai Jewish Chronicle) was set up in 1919 in Shanghai by G. F. Shemeshko and other Russians with socialist leanings, and received financial aid from the Soviet Russian government in early 1920. In April 1920, Voitinsky and his colleagues arrived in the Republic of China on a mission to establish a communist party. They not only came to China in the guise of editors and reporters for the newspaper, but also set up the Comintern's East Asia Secretariat in the newspaper office. From then on, the Shanghai Chronicle became both a propaganda vehicle for the East Asia Secretariat and a cover for Comintern activity in China. Because the newspaper staff assisted Soviet Russian and Comintern personnel stationed under cover at the newspaper in activities to establish a communist organization in the Republic of China, the newspaper as a whole played a special role in the early communist movement in China.

In November 1920, Voitinsky, working with Chen Duxiu and others, issued The Chinese Communist Party Manifesto and started a monthly publication called The Communist Party. Voitinsky left the Republic of China in early 1921, prior to the 1st National Congress of the Chinese Communist Party in July 1921.

== Later career ==
He worked as Comintern representative until 1926. Then worked in the Siberian government in Irkutsk until 1929, when he moved to Moscow, where he worked in various Orientalist institutions. In 1934, he became a professor in Moscow State University.

He is considered one of the founders of Soviet Sinology. He wrote several books about contemporary China politics. He died in 1953.

== Significance ==
The significance of Voitinsky in the founding of the Chinese Communist Party remains debated. Some contend that Voitinsky was fundamental in setting the party's formation in motion. Others, including the CCP's Institute of Party History and Literature, contend that Li Dazhao and Chen Duxiu had discussed forming a communist party before Voitinsky arrived in China. According to academic Yoshihiro Ishikawa, it is not possible to say with certainty that Li Dazhao and Chen Duxiu discussed the formation of a nationwide communist party prior to Voitinsky's arrival. Academic Yitzhak Shichor notes that the idea of forming a communist party had already circulated in China, but no action had been taken prior to Voitinsky's arrival. Ishikawa additionally states that "[t]his may at first glance seem like a trivial matter, but in fact, it contains the essential issue of whether the formation of the CCP was a result of the Soviet Union's revolutionary export or a product of the revolutionary movement of the Chinese themselves."

== See also ==
- History of the Chinese Communist Party
- Vladimir Neumann
- Henk Sneevliet
