= Liu Renjing =

Chinese politician (1902–1987)

- 劉仁靜
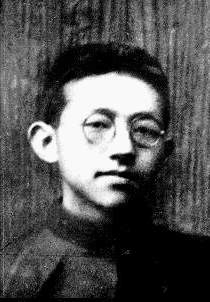

Personal details
- Born: 4 March 1902 Yingcheng, Hubei, Qing Empire
- Died: 5 August 1987 (aged 85) Beijing, China
- Party: Chinese Communist Party; Kuomintang
- Education: Peking University; International Lenin School

Liu Renjing (simplified Chinese: 刘仁静; traditional Chinese: 劉仁靜; also romanized as Liu Jen-ching; March 4, 1902 – August 5, 1987) was a Chinese revolutionary who was a founding member of the Chinese Communist Party (CCP). Out of sympathy for Trotsky, he was a Trotskyist from 1929 to 1949, and a member of Kuomintang during the 1940s. After the founding of the People's Republic of China, he published a statement in the People's Daily announcing his change of position.

== Early life and education ==
On March 4, 1902, Liu Renjing was born into a scholar family in Yingcheng, Hubei, Qing China. He attended Yingcheng Elementary School in his childhood. In 1914, he enrolled at Bowen Academy, and two years later entered the affiliated high school of Zhonghua University. During this period, Liu Renjing was influenced by magazines such as New Youth and The Tiger. In 1917, he met Yun Daiying and joined a mutual aid society organized by Yun. In 1918, he graduated from secondary school and enrolled in the Department of Physics at Peking University.

On May 4, 1919, he participated in the May Fourth Movement and was arrested by the police and sentenced to one month in prison for taking to the streets to call for unity among the masses. After his release, he transferred to the Department of Philosophy. He obtained information about the Russian Revolution and Marxism, and in 1920 joined a Marxist group organized by Li Dazhao.

== Early revolutionary activities ==
In 1921, Liu Renjing and Zhang Guotao jointly attended the founding congress of the Chinese Communist Party as representatives from Beijing. Liu Renjing was 19 years of age at the time of the founding meeting and was dubbed "little Marx" because of his knowledge of Marxist writings. He was reported to have engaged in heated discussion with Li Hanjun on the floor of the meeting.

In 1922, Liu Renjing traveled to Moscow with Chen Duxiu to attend the Fourth Congress of the Communist International, where Liu Renjing delivered a speech.

In 1926, Liu Renjing was sent by the Chinese Communist Party to study at the International Lenin School in Moscow. During his studies, the Soviet Union witnessed the power struggle between Stalin and Trotsky. Sympathizing with Trotsky's expulsion from the party and subsequent exile, Liu Renjing spent years searching for him across Europe after graduating from the Lenin School. He finally located Trotsky in Turkey, where they engaged in discussions for approximately one month.

== Expulsion from the CCP, Trotskyist activities and joining the Kuomintang ==
On August 16, 1929, Liu Renjing returned to Shanghai. Yun Daiying, entrusted by the Party Central Committee, held talks with Liu Renjing. Liu Renjing disagreed with the Central Committee's views. Subsequently, the Central Committee demanded that Liu Renjing account for his visit to Trotsky, but Liu Renjing still refused. This ultimately led to Liu Renjing's expulsion from the CCP.

Liu Renjing organized a small Trotskyist group in Shanghai called the October Society. In May 1931, Liu Renjing's group merged with two other small Trotskyist groups in Shanghai—the Combat Society and the Our Words—as well as the Proletarian Society led by Chen Duxiu and Peng Shuzhi. After the merger, Liu Renjing found himself at odds with Chen Duxiu within the group. Arrogantly styling himself as "Trotsky's representative," he was ultimately expelled from his group.

After being expelled from the organization, Liu Renjing had by then married Lu Shenzhi and was facing financial difficulties. In 1934, through a Trotskyist working at the Shanghai Evening Post & Mercury, Liu Renjing secured a position as an interpreter. In November 1935, Liu Renjing was arrested by the police in Beijing and sentenced to three years in prison. After his release in 1938, he attempted to find employment while reconnecting with Chen Duxiu, ultimately joining the Three Principles of the People Youth Corps, a youth organization led by the Kuomintang. From that point onward, Liu Renjing remained active within the Kuomintang until the founding of the People's Republic of China.

== After founding of the People's Republic of China ==
After the founding of the People's Republic of China, Liu Renjing publicly announced his political errors from his early years in the People's Daily. Later, he was transferred to Beijing Normal University to teach political economy, and subsequently worked as an editor and translator at People's Publishing House. With the beginning of the Cultural Revolution, Liu Renjing was arrested by the Red Guards and imprisoned in Qincheng Prison. However, he was ultimately released following Mao Zedong's intervention and placed under government protection. On August 5, 1987, he died in a car accident in Beijing.
