= Vladimir Neumann =

Soviet spy (1898–1943)

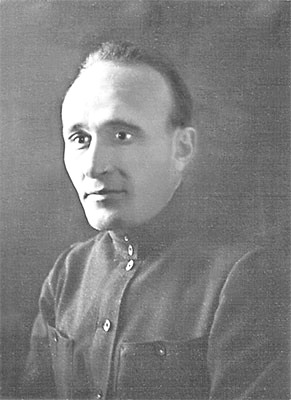
Neumann in the 1920s

Vladimir Abramovich Neumann (Russian: Владимир Абрамович Нейман; 10 February 1889 – 21 September 1938), also known as Victor Alexandrovich Berg but more commonly known by his nom de guerre "Nikolsky", was a member of the Communist Party of the Soviet Union and a participant in the 1st National Congress of the Chinese Communist Party.

== Biography ==
=== Early life and Russian Civil War ===
On February 10, 1889, Neumann was born to a Jewish family in Chitkan, Barguzin district, Transbaikal Oblast. He studied at the Chita Commercial School in his early years and worked as an employee in a private shop in Chita from 1912 to 1916. He began serving as a private in the 16th Siberian Infantry Reserve Regiment of the Imperial Russian Army in 1916 and was discharged in 1917. He was mobilized into Alexander Kolchak's army in 1919 and defected to the Red Army the same year. He joined the Communist Party of the Soviet Union in 1921 and became active with the Communist International (Comintern) the same year. From 1921 to 1923, he served in the intelligence department of the Revolutionary People's Army of the Far Eastern Republic. In 1921, he worked in the China Department of the Secretariat of the Far Eastern District of the Russian Communist Party.

=== China ===
In June 1921, Neumann using the nom de guerre "Nikolsky" arrived in Shanghai, being sent by the Far Eastern Bureau of the Communist International in Irkutsk with the task of leading and attending a congress to form a national-level communist party. Nikolsky met with another Comintern representative from the Netherlands, Henk Sneevliet, and they urged Li Da to convene a congress with the various communist cells across the country to found a party. On July 23, 1921, Nikolsky attended the 1st National Congress of the Chinese Communist Party in Shanghai, and delivered a speech at the meeting about the goals of the Profintern. Nikolsky left Shanghai in October or November the same year.

=== Later life ===
From 1922 to 1925, he worked in the reconnaissance section of the Far Eastern Frontier Plenipotentiary Representative Office and carried out underground work in places such as Manchuria. After 1925, he worked in the Far Eastern Frontier and served as the head of the Foreign Affairs Department of the Far Eastern Frontier Leadership Committee. During the 1929 Sino-Soviet conflict, he was responsible for sabotage and underground work in Pogranichny. From 1930 to 1932, he was responsible for intelligence work against the Empire of Japan in Heihe City, and worked on Operation Maki Mirage. From 1933 to 1935, he worked in the Far Eastern Frontier Internal Affairs Department in Shanghai. From 1935 to 1937, he served as the plenipotentiary representative of the 7th Department of the State Security Leadership Committee of the Soviet Ministry of Internal Affairs, during which time he carried out underground work in the Republic of China.

=== Death ===
In February 1938, during the Great Purge, he was arrested in Khabarovsk and accused of being a spy for the Empire of Japan and a Trotskyist. Following a ten-minute show trial, he was executed by firing squad in Khabarovsk on September 21, 1938. On November 8, 1956, the Military Tribunal of the Supreme Court of the Soviet Union posthumously exonerated him.

== Legacy ==
Because Nikolsky's life and career were largely unknown for a long time, he was called the "forgotten" participant of the 1st National Congress of the Chinese Communist Party or the "fifteenth person" of the 1st National Congress. In the 1986, Chinese diplomats asked Mikhail Gorbachev for assistance in locating biographical materials and photographs of Nikolsky. Mongolian and Russian archival scholars later located a photograph of Nikolsky. In September 2007, a photograph of Nikolsky was first displayed at the Site of the First National Congress of the Chinese Communist Party.

== See also ==
- History of the Chinese Communist Party
