= Far Eastern Bureau of the Communist International =

Chinese name
- Traditional Chinese: 共產國際執行委員會遠東局
- Simplified Chinese: 共产国际执行委员会远东局
Transcriptions

Russian name
- Russian: Дальневосточное бюро ИККИ

The Far Eastern Bureau of the Communist International was an organ of the Communist International (Comintern) established in 1920 to develop their political influence in the Far East. The name was used in subsequent years, but the continuity of the organization cannot be proven.

The organization was originally founded as the Far Eastern Bureau of the Russian Communist Party, when the central committee of that organization sent Vladimir Vilensky-Sibiryakov to Siberia as plenipotentiary for Far Eastern Affairs. Grigori Voitinsky was sent to the Republic of China in 1920, where he undertook the preparatory work for the formation of the Chinese Communist Party (CCP). In June 1921, at the direction of the bureau, two Comintern representatives, Vladimir Neumann and Henk Sneevliet, arrived in Shanghai and urged Li Da to convene a national-level meeting to form a communist party, which Li did. Both Comintern representatives attended the CCP's founding meeting in July 1921.

== Significance ==
The significance of the Far Eastern Bureau in the founding of the Chinese Communist Party remains debated. Some contend that Grigori Voitinsky set the party's formation in motion. Others, including the CCP's Institute of Party History and Literature, contend that Li Dazhao and Chen Duxiu had discussed forming a communist party before Voitinsky arrived in China. According to academic Yoshihiro Ishikawa, "This may at first glance seem like a trivial matter, but in fact, it contains the essential issue of whether the formation of the CCP was a result of the Soviet Union's revolutionary export or a product of the revolutionary movement of the Chinese themselves."

== See also ==
- History of the Chinese Communist Party
- Pan-Pacific Trade Union Secretariat
- Communist University of the Toilers of the East
- Moscow Sun Yat-sen University
- International Liaison Department of the Communist International
