= Ilanskaya railway station =

Railway station in Ilansky, Russia

Coordinates: 56.2406°N 96.0688°E

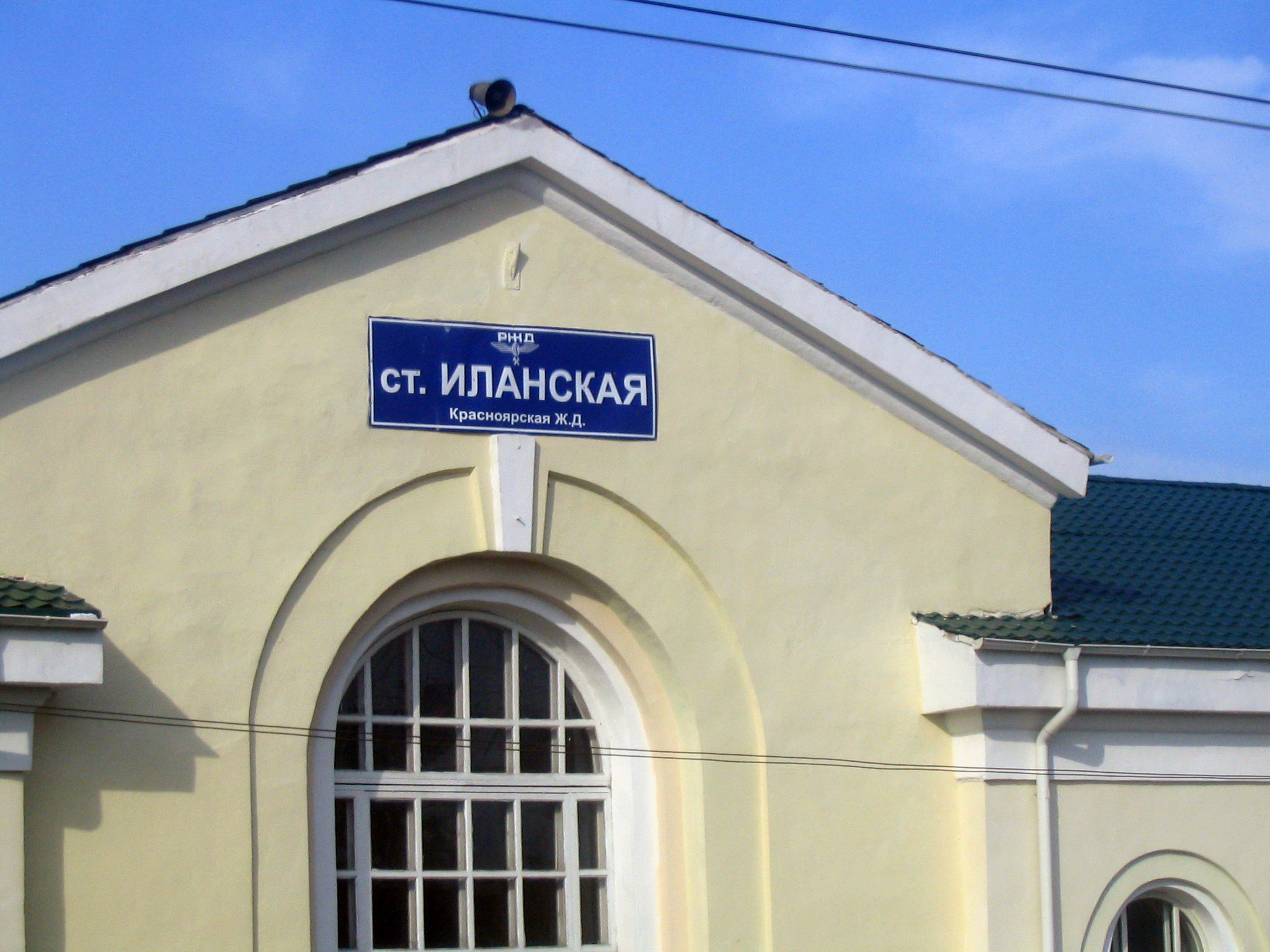
Ilanskaya station in 2006

The Ilanskaya railway station is an important station on the Trans Siberian Railway that serves the town Ilansky, Ilansky District of Krasnoyarsk Krai, Russia.

The station was opened in 1894 about 5 kilometres from Ilansky, but a separate settlement developed around the station.

During the 1905 Revolution, railway workers based at Ilanskaya railway station played a major role in challenging the tsarist regime. General Alexander Meller-Zakomelsky described it as a "nest of revolutionaries". On 12 January 1906, a detachment of troops he sent to suppress a demonstration at the station killed 17 people, with a further 22 injured and 73 participants of the gathering were arrested. In 1908 Vladimir Vilensky-Sibiryakov was arrested for distributing revolutionary literature to railway workers at the station.
