= Vladimir Vilensky-Sibiryakov =

Russian Revolutionary and Historian (1888–1942)

Vladimir Dmitrievich Vilensky-Sibiryakov (Russian: Влади́мир Дми́триевич Виле́нский-Сибиряко́в; 8 July 1888 – 2 July 1942) was a Russian Bolshevik revolutionary and political activist involved in the Russian Revolution in Siberia and later a Soviet Comintern representative and historian.

Vladimir was born in Tomsk, Siberia. He was orphaned as a child and became a foundry worker, joining the Tomsk Social-Democrats before the 1905 revolution. He was arrested in 1908 for distributing revolutionary literature amongst the railway workers on Ilanskaya railway station.

In 1919 Vilensky was appointed by the Russian Communist Party as the plenipotentiary for Far Eastern Affairs. He went to Vladivostok, where he established what evolved into the Far Eastern Bureau of the Comintern, originally the Far Eastern Bureau of the Russian Communist Party. Soon after its establishment, Vilensky-Sibiryakov sent Grigori Voitinsky to Shanghai as its representative. Vilensky-Sibiryakov visited Beijing in July 1920.

He was active in the Society of Former Political Convicts and Exiles (OPK), for a period, editing the journal Katorga i ssylka (Hard Labour and Exile).

He was expelled from the Communist Party of the Soviet Union in 1927, accused of anti-party fractional work. But he was reinstated in 1931, only to be expelled again in 1936.

Vilensky-Sibiryakov was sentenced to 8 years of forced labour in 1936. He died out of exhaustion in a gulag in Ilansky. He was posthumously rehabilitated in 1957.
