= Chitkan =

Chitkan Читкан
- Selo
- Location within Republic of Buryatia Location within Russia
- Coordinates: 53°29′N 109°46′E
- Country: Russia
- Region: Republic of Buryatia
- District: Barguzinsky District
- Time zone: UTC+8:00

Chitkan (Russian: Читкан; Buryat: Шидхан, Shidkhan) is a rural locality (a selo) and the administrative centre of Chitkanskoye Rural Settlement, Barguzinsky District, Republic of Buryatia, Russia. The population was 957 as of 2017. There are 7 streets.

== Geography ==
Chitkan is located 28 km southeast of Barguzin (the district's administrative centre) by road. Maloye Uro is the nearest rural locality.
