= Deng Enming =

Chinese communist revolutionary (1900–1931)

- 邓恩铭
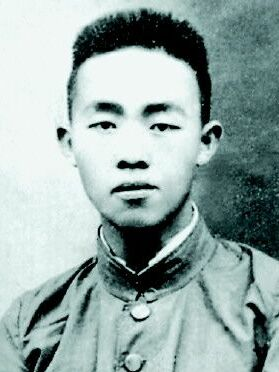
- Born: 5 January 1901; Libo County, Duyun Prefecture, Guizhou, Qing China
- Died: 5 April 1931 (aged 30); Jinan, Shandong, Republic of China
- Cause of death: Execution
- Burial place: Jinan Revolutionary Martyrs Cemetery
- Occupations: Politician, revolutionary
- Political party: Chinese Communist Party

Deng Enming (simplified Chinese: 邓恩铭; traditional Chinese: 鄧恩銘; pinyin: Dèng Ēnmíng, 5 January 1901 – 5 April 1931), courtesy name Zhongyao, was a Chinese communist revolutionary and one of the founding members of the Chinese Communist Party (CCP). A member of the Shui ethnic group from Guizhou, he and Wang Jinmei represented the communist group in Jinan at the party's founding congress in 1921, where he was the only delegate from an ethnic minority.

Deng later built the party organisation in Qingdao, led strikes on the Qingdao–Jinan railway and at Japanese-owned cotton mills, and served as party secretary of Shandong. He was arrested three times, and after his last arrest, in Jinan in January 1929, he was executed with 21 other communists on 5 April 1931. In 2009, he was named one of 100 heroes who made outstanding contributions to the founding of the People's Republic of China.

== Early life and education ==
Deng was born on 5 January 1901 in Shuipu, a village in Libo County, Guizhou, to a Shui family. His courtesy name was Zhongyao. His family was poor, and after it moved to the county seat of Libo, his mother made tofu to add to the household's income. He began at a traditional private school at about the age of five or six, and at primary school in Libo, he was taught by Gao Huang, who had studied in Japan and supported Sun Yat-sen's revolution. In 1915, he joined street protests against Yuan Shikai's acceptance of the Twenty-One Demands and took part in a boycott of Japanese goods.

In August 1917, at the age of 16, Deng left Guizhou for Jinan, Shandong, where his uncle Huang Zepei was a county magistrate. With his uncle's financial support, he entered the Shandong Provincial No. 1 Middle School in 1918. After the May Fourth Movement of 1919, he was elected head of the school's student self-government association, edited the school newspaper and organised student strikes. During the movement, he met Wang Jinmei, who became his closest comrade.

== Revolutionary career ==
=== Founding of the party ===
In November 1920, Deng, Wang Jinmei and others founded the Lixin Society in Jinan, which published the semi-monthly magazine Lixin. Between the winter of 1920 and the spring of 1921, he and Wang founded a communist group in Jinan. In July 1921, the two represented the Jinan group at the First National Congress of the CCP in Shanghai, and on 24 July, they reported to the congress on the group's work. At 20, Deng was the only delegate from an ethnic minority.

In January 1922, Deng travelled to Moscow for the Congress of the Toilers of the Far East, which opened on 21 January, as part of a Chinese delegation of 44 people, 14 of whom represented the CCP. According to official Chinese accounts, he was received by Vladimir Lenin during the visit. He stayed on in Soviet Russia to study and returned to Shandong about three months later. People's Daily has also stated that he attended the Second National Congress in July 1922.

=== Qingdao and the labour movement ===
In April 1923, the party sent Deng to Qingdao, where he became secretary of the local party branch in August and of the Socialist Youth League branch in November. He also edited the supplement of the Jiao'ao Daily. During the First United Front, he helped the Kuomintang build its organisation in Shandong, and the founding of the Kuomintang's Qingdao executive committee in November 1924 marked the start of formal cooperation between the two parties in the city.

In February 1925, Deng and Wang Jinmei led a strike by workers on the Qingdao–Jinan railway and at the Sifang locomotive works. From April, he organised strikes at Japanese-owned cotton mills in Qingdao, which continued for more than three months. He was arrested at a meeting of strike leaders on 4 May 1925 and expelled from Qingdao a week later. On 29 May, the authorities fired on striking mill workers, killing eight people, and after this and the May Thirtieth incident in Shanghai, Deng secretly returned to Qingdao to lead protests.

=== Shandong party leadership ===
In August 1925, Deng became secretary of the CCP's Shandong local committee. On 7 November 1925, after the committee's offices were raided, he was arrested again. He was tortured in prison and developed tuberculosis, and the party secured his release on medical parole. In mid-1926, he secretly returned to Qingdao as secretary of the city's party committee.

In April 1927, Deng attended the Fifth National Congress in Wuhan, and he lectured on the labour and peasant movements in Shandong at the peasant movement training institute run by Mao Zedong. After returning to Shandong, he became secretary of the provincial party committee. In February 1928, he was sent back to Qingdao as secretary of the city committee.

== Arrest and execution ==
In January 1929, after two party members, including Wang Fuyuan, defected to the authorities, Deng warned the party's liaison officer, Yu Xiu, to leave Jinan, but he stayed behind himself to protect other members. He was arrested in Jinan on 19 January 1929, his third arrest. Some earlier official accounts date the arrest to December 1928.

In prison, Deng set up a party branch and led two hunger strikes and two escape attempts. During the second attempt, on the night of 21 July 1929, prisoners seized two gates and some of them escaped, but Deng, weakened by torture, was recaptured and placed in a cell for prisoners condemned to death. In October 1930, he was tried by a court convened by the Shandong provincial government of Han Fuju, and he acknowledged that he was a member of the CCP. While ill in prison in 1930, he wrote a farewell poem addressed to his mother.

Early on 5 April 1931, Deng and 21 other communists, including the former Shandong party secretary Liu Qianchu and Guo Longzhen, were executed by firing squad at the Weiba Road execution ground in Jinan. According to official accounts, they sang The Internationale on the way to the execution ground. Deng was 30 years old.

== Personal life ==
Deng's parents and relatives tried to persuade him to give up his revolutionary work, including by arranging a betrothal, but he refused. His grandniece, Deng Qingmei, later became head of Limingguan Shui Ethnic Township in Libo.

== Legacy ==
In 1949, shortly before the founding of the People's Republic, Mao Zedong told Shandong leaders not to forget veteran comrades and asked them to establish the history of Wang Jinmei and Deng Enming and collect their belongings. Dong Biwu, a fellow delegate at the founding congress, later wrote a poem recalling Deng and Wang. In 2009, during the 60th anniversary of the People's Republic, Deng was named one of 100 heroes who made outstanding contributions to its founding.

The April 5 Martyrs Memorial, which commemorates the 22 communists executed on 5 April 1931, was built on the site of the Weiba Road execution ground in Jinan by the local Communist Youth League committee in 1988 and completed in April 1989. Deng's former residence in Libo houses a memorial exhibition with more than 600 photographs and more than 170 artefacts. In January 2011, Guizhou held events in Libo to mark the 110th anniversary of his birth, including the start of filming of the biographical film Young Deng Enming.

=== In popular culture ===
Deng has been portrayed in several films.

Year	Title	Chinese title	Actor	Ref.
2011	Beginning of the Great Revival	建党伟业	Zhang Yishan	
2011	Young Deng Enming	少年邓恩铭	Zhang Yishan	
2021	1921	1921	Wang Junkai	
