= 1st National Congress of the Chinese Communist Party =

Founding conference in 1921

1st National Congress of the Chinese Communist Party 中国共产党第一次全国代表大会
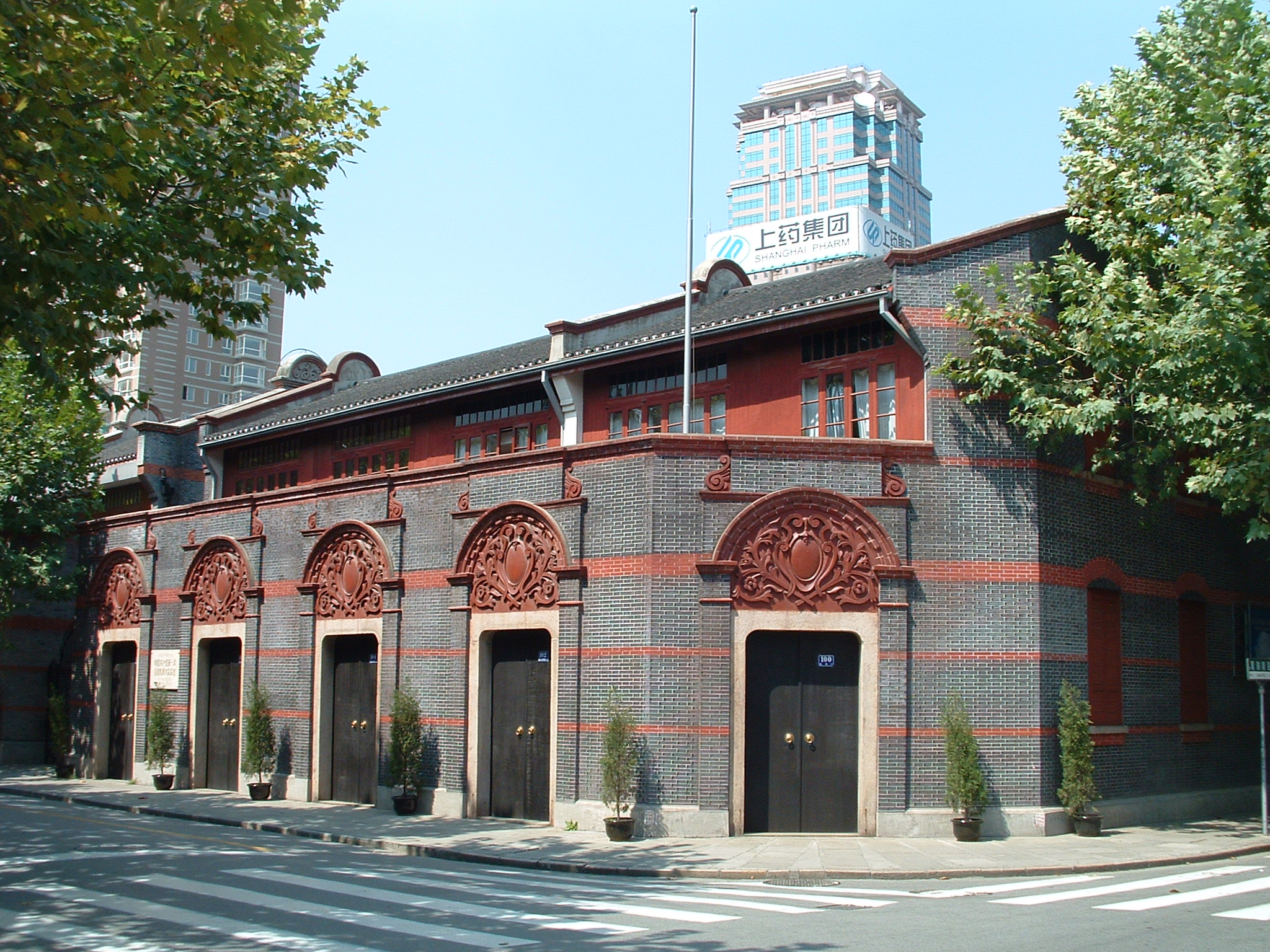
- Site of the 1st Congress in Shanghai
- Begins: July 23, 1921
- Ends: August 3, 1921
- Locations: Shanghai and Jiaxing
- Next event: 2nd National Congress of the Chinese Communist Party (1922)
- Participants: 13 delegates
- Major events: Formal establishment of the Chinese Communist Party

1st National Congress of the Chinese Communist Party
- Traditional Chinese: 中國共產黨第一次全國代表大會
- Simplified Chinese: 中国共产党第一次全国代表大会
Transcriptions
Standard Mandarin
- Hanyu Pinyin: Zhōngguó Gòngchǎndǎng Dìyīcì Quánguó Dàibiǎo Dàhuì
- Gwoyeu Romatzyh: Jonggwo Gonqchaandaang Dihitsyh .Chiuangwo Daybeau Dahhuey
- Wade–Giles: Chungkuo Kungchantang Tiyich‘i Chʻüankuo Taipiao Tahui

Abbreviation
- Chinese: 一大
Transcriptions
Standard Mandarin
- Hanyu Pinyin: Yī Dà

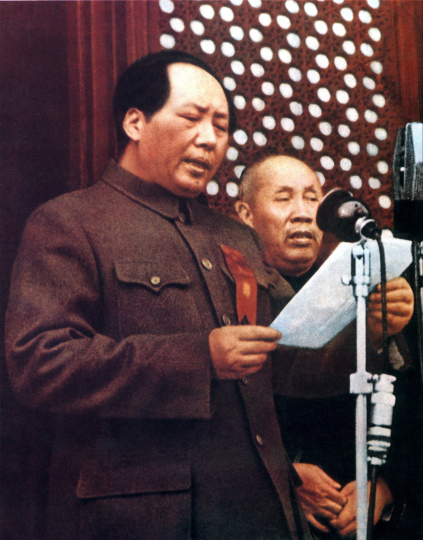
Of the 13 delegates who attended the congress in 1921, Mao Zedong and Dong Biwu were the only two to also be present at the proclamation ceremony of the PRC in 1949, as pictured here.

The 1st National Congress of the Chinese Communist Party was held in Shanghai and Jiaxing between July 23 and August 3, 1921. The congress established the Chinese Communist Party (CCP).

== Formative meeting ==
The congress began in a shikumen building of the Shanghai French Concession (near present-day Xintiandi in Huangpu District). In early June 1921, two Communist International (Comintern) representatives, Vladimir Neumann (commonly known as Nikolsky) and Dutch national Henk Sneevliet, also known as Maring, arrived in Shanghai, and urged Li Da to call various communist cells in the country to come together for a national-level meeting to form a communist party. Li Da subsequently called a meeting to form a national party. There were 13 Chinese delegates when the meeting opened on July 23. At the time, there were 57 members of the CCP. Notably, the two founders of the party did not attend the congress: Chen Duxiu and Li Dazhao.

The meeting was put to an end due to a search of the meeting site by the French Concession police on the night of July 30. The delegates then agreed to move the meeting to a rented tourist boat on South Lake in Jiaxing. The Congress elected Chen Duxiu as Secretary (in absentia), Zhang Guotao as Director of Organization, and Li Da as Director of Propaganda.

The General Assembly adopted The First Program of the Communist Party of China, stating that "the Party is to be named the Communist Party of China" and specifying its objectives: "to overthrow the power of the capitalist class[,]" to "eradicate capitalism and private ownership of property[,]" and to "join the Comintern." The program was not a formal party constitution, but described the basics of the party's program, organization, and discipline. The founding meeting and first months of the CCP were financed by the Comintern.

Of the 13 delegates who attended the congress in 1921, only two would be present at the 1949 proclamation of the People's Republic of China 28 years later: Mao Zedong and Dong Biwu. Seven of the original delegates left the CCP, one died of illness, and three died for the cause.

== Aftermath ==
The site of the conference in Shanghai was converted into a museum in 1961. The South Lake Revolutionary Museum in Jiaxing, located on a central island of the lake, was constructed in 1959. A complex hosting more exhibits was constructed north of South Lake in 2011, also to commemorate the 1st Congress. The 2nd National Congress of the Chinese Communist Party was held in July 1922.

== Delegates ==
The 13 Chinese delegates at the founding meeting were:

- Li Da (Shanghai)
- Li Hanjun (Shanghai)
- Zhang Guotao (Beijing)
- Liu Renjing (Beijing)
- Mao Zedong (Changsha)
- He Shuheng (Changsha)
- Dong Biwu (Wuhan)
- Chen Tanqiu (Wuhan)
- Wang Jinmei (Jinan)
- Deng Enming (Jinan)
- Chen Gongbo (Guangzhou)
- Zhou Fohai (representing Chinese students in Japan)
- Bao Huiseng (representing the absent Chen Duxiu)

== See also ==
- History of the Chinese Communist Party
