= Li Hanjun =

Founding member of the Chinese Communist Party

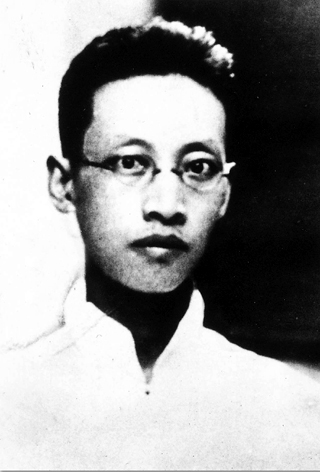
Li Hanjun

Li Hanjun (Chinese: 李汉俊; pinyin: Lǐ Hànjùn; 1890 – December 17, 1927) was an alternate member of the 3rd Central Executive Committee of the Chinese Communist Party. He was the younger brother of Li Shucheng. Born in Hubei Province, he studied abroad in Japan from 1902 to 1918, graduating from University of Tokyo. Li came into contact with Marxism through Japanese-language sources. He was fluent in Japanese, English, French and German. His residence was used as the Site of the First National Congress of the Chinese Communist Party.

Although a founding member of the Chinese Communist Party, he later left the party after coming into conflict with Zhang Guotao and joined the Kuomintang. An opponent of Chiang Kai-shek's anti-communist "White Terror" campaign, he fled to the Japanese concession in Hankou when Chiang's supporters entered Wuhan in November 1927. He was captured by the New Guangxi clique and executed.
