= Chen Duxiu =

Chinese intellectual and revolutionary (1879–1942)

- 陈独秀
- Chen c. 1919

General Secretary of the Chinese Communist Party
- In office 23 July 1921 – 7 August 1927
- Preceded by: Position established
- Succeeded by: Xiang Zhongfa

Personal details
- Born: 9 October 1879 Anqing, Anhui, China
- Died: 27 May 1942 (aged 62) Jiangjin, Sichuan, China
- Party: Chinese Communist Party (1921–1929)
- Education: Qiushi Academy (now Zhejiang University)
- Known for: Co-founder of the CCP; Leading figure in the New Culture Movement and May Fourth Movement; Dean of the School of Arts and Letters at Peking University (1917–1919); Founder and editor of New Youth magazine

Chinese name
- Traditional Chinese: 陳獨秀
- Simplified Chinese: 陈独秀
Transcriptions
Standard Mandarin
- Hanyu Pinyin: Chén Dúxiù
- Gwoyeu Romatzyh: Chern Dwushiow
- Wade–Giles: Chʻên^{2} Tu^{2}-hsiu^{4}
- IPA: [ʈʂʰə̌n tǔɕjôʊ]
other Mandarin
- Xiao'erjing: چِنْ دُوشْيَوْ
Yue: Cantonese
- Yale Romanization: Chàhn Duhk-sau
- Jyutping: Can4 Duk6sau3
- IPA: [tsʰɐn˩ tʊk̚˨ sɐw˧]

Courtesy name
- Chinese: 仲甫
Transcriptions
Standard Mandarin
- Hanyu Pinyin: Zhòngfǔ
- Gwoyeu Romatzyh: Jonqfuu
- Wade–Giles: Chung^{4}-fu^{3}
- IPA: [ʈʂʊ̂ŋfù]
other Mandarin
- Xiao'erjing: ژَوڭفُو

Chen Duxiu (simplified Chinese: 陈独秀; traditional Chinese: 陳獨秀; pinyin: Chén Dúxiù; Wade–Giles: Chʻên Tu-hsiu; 9 October 1879 – 27 May 1942) was a Chinese intellectual, revolutionary, and political activist. Chen Duxiu was one of the founders of the Chinese Communist Party (CCP) in 1921 and served as its first General Secretary from 1921 to 1927. Chen was also a leading figure in the New Culture Movement (c. 1915–1922) and May Fourth Movement of 1919, which significantly influenced China's intellectual and political landscape in the early 20th century.

Born in Anhui, Chen was raised in a traditional gentry family but became involved in revolutionary activities from a young age. He studied in Japan, where he was exposed to Western ideas and became involved with Chinese student activist groups. Returning to China, he played a key role in local revolutionary movements in Anhui, notably through journalism and education, advocating for a vernacular literary revolution and the preservation of China's "national essence". During the New Culture Movement, Chen rose to national prominence as the editor of the influential magazine New Youth (Xin Qingnian) and as Dean of Arts and Letters at Peking University. He championed science, democracy, and vernacular literature, while launching trenchant critiques of traditional Confucianism and Chinese society. His writings and leadership were instrumental in shaping the May Fourth generation of intellectuals and activists.

Following the May Fourth Movement and influenced by the Russian Revolution, Chen embraced Marxism and, with the assistance of Comintern agents, co-founded the CCP. As its first leader, he navigated the complex early years of the party, including the First United Front with the Kuomintang (KMT). However, he was removed from leadership in 1927, becoming a scapegoat for the failures of the United Front. Subsequently, Chen became associated with the Trotskyist Left Opposition and was expelled from the CCP in 1929. He spent his later years in relative political isolation, attempting to reconcile Marxism with his earlier democratic ideals and continuing his philological research until his death in Sichuan in 1942.

Chen Duxiu's legacy is complex. While often criticized in official CCP historiography for "right-wing opportunism", he is recognized as a founder of the party and a pivotal figure in modern Chinese intellectual and revolutionary history. He represented the internationalistic and Westernizing Marxist influences of the early CCP, which were later superseded by the more nationalist and voluntaristic tendencies of Mao Zedong.

== Early life and education ==
=== Childhood and family background ===
Chen Duxiu was born on 9 October 1879 in Anqing, Anhui. He provided scant details about his early life in his unfinished autobiography, recalling himself as a "fatherless child". His father, a minor official and tutor, died when Chen was two years old, not two months as Chen later claimed. After his father's death, Chen was adopted by his paternal uncle, Chen Xifan, a powerful official who amassed considerable wealth, partly through business dealings involving a British firm and soybean exports from Manchuria where he served. This uncle's beneficent influence contrasted with the harshness of Chen's grandfather, whom Chen described as an opium-smoking, tyrannical figure who oversaw his early education. Chen's portrayal of his grandfather may have been crafted to appeal to the anti-patriarchal sentiments of the youth he later led.

The Chen family was an "up-and-coming" one that had improved its social standing through hard work and enterprise rather than solely through official connections. Chen Xifan, despite his relative wealth and official position, was described as an unpretentious man with a common touch. The family's pragmatic approach and engagement with Western commercial opportunities likely influenced Chen's later views on national development and his critique of traditional elites who he felt hindered China's progress.

=== Student of tradition and early reformist ideas ===
Chen was immersed in Confucian classics from a young age. He reportedly found the official eight-legged essay style tedious, preferring the 6th-century poetry anthology Zhaoming Wenxuan, which contained many obscure characters. This interest in obscure characters hinted at an early inclination towards the kaozheng (evidential research) school of scholarship, known for its critical approach to neo-Confucian orthodoxy. He also read the works of the 18th-century poet Yuan Mei, an advocate for women's rights and a critic of the examination system.

In 1896, at the age of 17, Chen passed the imperial xiucai examination, ranking first in his district. The following year, he travelled to Nanjing to sit for the higher-level juren examination, an experience he vividly described in his autobiography. He was disappointed by the city's condition and the crude behavior of fellow students, but the gathering of young scholars also provided an opportunity for the exchange of new ideas. It was during this period, following China's defeat by Japan in 1895, that reformist ideas, particularly those of Kang Youwei and Liang Qichao disseminated through publications like Shiwu Bao (Chinese Progress), began to circulate widely. Chen was attracted to these new iconoclastic views, finding in them a path to respectable engagement with Western learning, which he had previously seen as subservient to foreign powers.

After failing the juren examination, Chen published a pamphlet in Anqing titled An Account of the Topography of the Yangzi River (Chinese: 扬子江形势论略; pinyin: Yángzǐ jiāng xíngshì lùnlüè). Based on "old travel books as well as the descriptions of foreigners", the work was a detailed geographical study of the Yangtze River, focusing on its strategic points for national defense against foreign incursion and demonstrating Chen's early nationalism and stylistic brilliance.

== Early revolutionary activities ==
=== Coming of age and studies in Japan ===
Around 1896 or 1897, Chen's uncle arranged a high-status marriage for him to Gao Xiaolan (高曉嵐), the daughter of the military prefect of Anqing. The marriage was reportedly unhappy, as Gao was a traditional woman with little sympathy for Chen's radical ideas. This experience may have reinforced Chen's advocacy for women's education, an idea already present in the writings of iconoclastic Chinese thinkers like Yuan Mei and Li Zhi. Chen would later have a long-lasting liaison with Gao Xiaolan's younger, college-educated, Western-dressed half-sister, Gao Junman (高君曼).

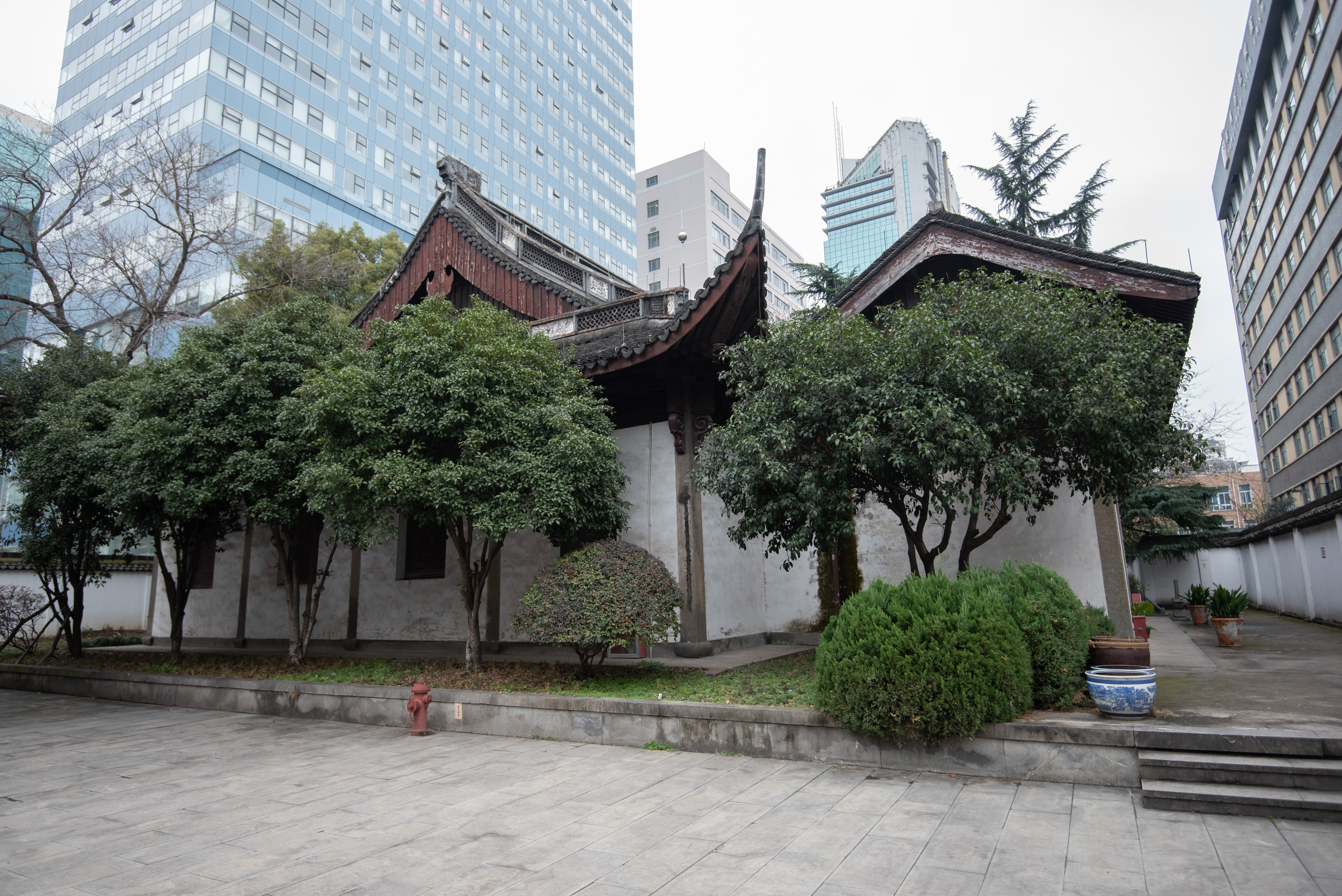
Former site of Qiushi Academy in Hangzhou, Zhejiang

In 1899, Chen returned from Manchuria (where he had accompanied his uncle) to Anqing for his mother's funeral. Around 1900 or 1901, he became a student at the Qiushi Academy (now Zhejiang University) in Hangzhou, one of the first institutions in the southern Yangtze Valley region to teach Western alongside traditional subjects. The radical scholar Zhang Binglin had previously taught at the academy, and his iconoclastic interpretations of Chinese tradition and interest in Western ideas profoundly appealed to Chen. In 1901, Chen and several other students were expelled from Qiushi after being involved in a confrontation with the Qing government over an anti-government phrase in an essay.

By the end of 1902, Chen was in Japan, where he, along with other former Qiushi students like Zhang Ji and Su Manshu, helped establish the Youth Society (Chinese: 青年会; pinyin: Qīngnián huì). This was the first avowedly revolutionary organization among Chinese students in Japan, inspired by Giuseppe Mazzini's Young Italy movement. The society was particularly concerned with Russian activities in Manchuria and in April 1903 formed a student volunteer army to resist Russian encroachment. Shortly thereafter, Chen was expelled from Japan for his involvement in an incident where he and fellow students forcibly cut off the queue of a Qing government agent appointed to monitor Hubei students.

=== Anhui Patriotic Society and Anhui Common Speech Journal ===
Upon returning to Anhui in 1903, Chen helped establish a small revolutionary library and participated in the Youth Determination Study Society (Chinese: 青年励志学社; pinyin: Qīngnián Lìzhì Xuéshè). He then co-founded the Anhui Patriotic Society (Chinese: 安徽爱国会; pinyin: Ānhuī Àiguó Huì) in Anqing to organize student mobilization against the Russian usurpation of Manchuria. The society's constitution emphasized uniting the masses, developing patriotic thought, fostering a martial spirit, and adhering to a rigorous moral and physical regimen, including daily exercise and abstention from vices like smoking, visiting prostitutes, and gambling. In a notable speech to the society, Chen passionately denounced the secret treaty ceding power in Manchuria to Russia, condemned the subservience of Qing officials, and called for popular unity and action, expressing his belief that the new student stratum, rather than the traditional scholar-gentry, should lead the nation. He urged the audience to "take the responsibility of struggling to the death to protect our land". These activities led to a confrontation at the Anhui Academy and a warrant for Chen's arrest, forcing him to flee Anhui.

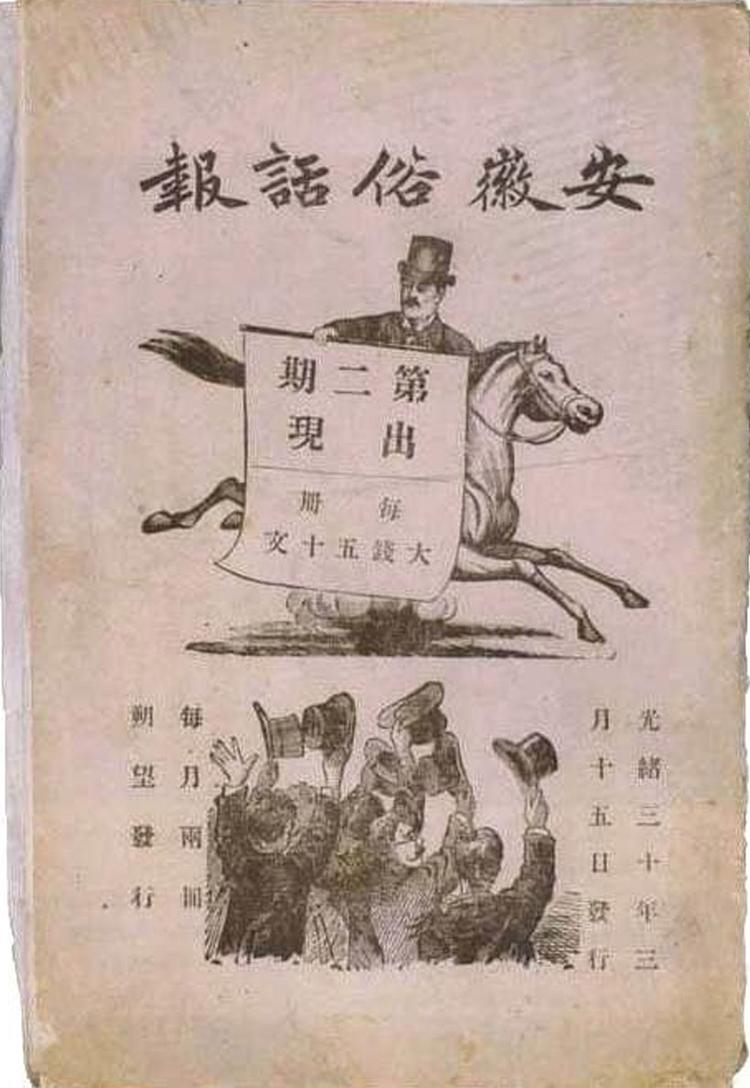
Cover of the second issue of the Anhui Common Speech Journal, 1904

In early 1904, Chen established, edited, and wrote for the Anhui Common Speech Journal (Chinese: 安徽俗话报; pinyin: Ānhuī Súhuà Bào), the first vernacular (baihua) newspaper in Anhui and one of the earliest in China. Initially written in Anqing and published in Wuhu by Wang Mengzou's Science Book Company, the journal's editorial department soon moved to Wuhu. Its circulation grew from an initial 1,000 copies to over 3,000 by its closure in August 1905, allegedly making it the most widely read vernacular journal in China at the time. In the journal, Chen assumed the role of a "Mandarin" teacher, aiming to disseminate new ideas to the masses. He covered diverse topics including Chinese history, Western educational methods and science, military techniques, and critiques of imperialist encroachment.

A central theme was the unique identity of the Chinese nation and the restoration of its guocui (national essence). Influenced by Zhang Binglin, Chen traced the origins of the Han people, emphasizing their conflicts with the Miao and the spiritual, rather than biological, ancestry of Huang Di (the Yellow Emperor). He stressed the biological purity of the Han race and argued that a nation required "a definite land", "definite people", and "a definite society". He attacked the Manchu rulers for allowing foreign powers to plunder China's resources and advocated for Chinese control over its own industry, proposing the formation of an Anhui Mining Company.

=== Vernacular revolution and traditional influences ===
The Anhui Common Speech Journal was a key platform for Chen's early advocacy of a vernacular literary revolution. He argued that the complex classical literary language alienated the masses and hindered national progress. His use of the vernacular was an attempt to return to an original national heritage where, he believed, elite and mass culture were more united. Chen's interest in vernacular reform was rooted in the philological research of earlier Chinese iconoclasts and the kaozheng tradition, which sought to discover the "lost past". He believed that etymological research was necessary to establish the original sounds of words and create a true vernacular language, potentially one written with Roman characters.

While advocating for the popular prose fiction of the masses, Chen also pioneered the publication of short stories and plays in the vernacular in the journal, including his own short novel, Black Paradise (Chinese: 黑天堂; pinyin: Hēi Tiāntáng), a love story about a Russian revolutionary. He proposed that the various Chinese dialects be replaced by a single national spoken language taught in schools to promote national unity.

Despite his attacks on certain aspects of Confucianism, particularly its association with the existing social and political order, Chen's ideas were often expressed through a traditional lens. He criticized the Chinese family system for restricting individual freedom and fostering a lack of patriotism, comparing the Chinese to the Jews whose nation, he claimed, perished due to excessive absorption with family. He advocated for equality for women, freedom of divorce, and the right for widows to remarry. While stopping short of total freedom of marriage, he proposed a Japanese-influenced system where parental introduction was followed by the couple's consent. Chen's critique of "bad customs" like feng shui was framed in terms of their wastefulness and hindrance to China's development, particularly its mining industry. Though a self-declared Buddhist at this time, he criticized superstitious practices like icon worship, distinguishing them from original Buddhist ideals.

=== Warrior Yue Society and later pre-1911 activities ===
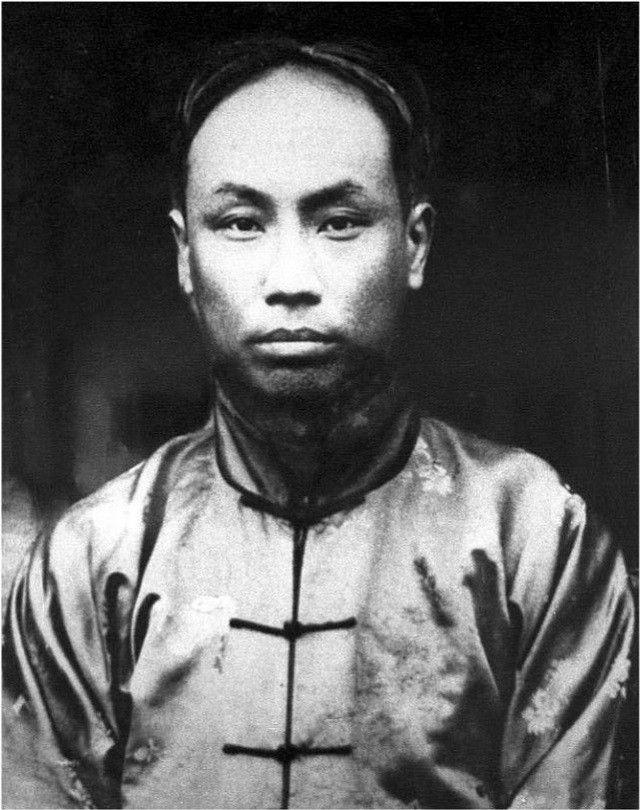
A young Chen Duxiu

In the summer of 1904, Chen accepted a position as a special lecturer at the Anhui Public School in Wuhu, to which he also moved the Anhui Common Speech Journal. The school was a hub for radicals, including Liu Shipei, Su Manshu, and Bo Wenwei. Here, Chen organized his students into the Warrior Yue Society (Chinese: 岳王会; pinyin: Yuèwáng Huì), named in honor of the Song dynasty patriot Yue Fei. The society was a small, conspiratorial organization that aimed to achieve its goals through assassinations and infiltration of the armed forces, reflecting Chen's belief in the power of heroic action by a dedicated elite to awaken the masses. One of its most famous actions was the attempted assassination of five imperial commissioners in Beijing in September 1905 by Wu Yue, a former student of Chen. The attack, planned in conjunction with Chen, failed when the bomb detonated prematurely, killing Wu Yue, but it provided significant impetus to the revolutionary cause.

Following increased government pressure and the assassination of En Ming, the governor of Anhui, by Xu Xilin (a member of the affiliated Restoration Society) in 1907, Chen fled to Japan, where he remained until 1909. During this period, he continued his philological studies and interest in Buddhism, seeing it as a possible source for China's national essence and an alternative to Confucianism. In March 1908, he co-founded the Asian Cousins Society with Zhang Binglin, Zhang Ji, Liu Shipei, and Su Manshu, aiming to unite Asian nations against Western imperialism using traditional Asian philosophies and religions.

Chen's revolutionary activities in Anhui often drew upon and exacerbated existing regional and class conflicts. The Anhui Common Speech Journal, for instance, circulated most widely not in south-central Anhui where the dominant upper scholar-gentry clans resided, but in the northern and southern areas (Huizhou, Luzhou, Yingzhou) where a lower-stratum gentry, often involved in commerce or military affairs, resented the established elite. Chen harnessed these resentments to fight against British incursions and promote local Chinese enterprise.

When the Xinhai Revolution erupted in 1911, Anhui was initially unprepared. Sun Yuyun, Chen's old revolutionary associate, became governor and appointed Chen as head of the Anhui provincial secretariat. After Sun Yuyun allied with Yuan Shikai, Bo Wenwei, Chen's former Warrior Yue Society lieutenant, took over the governorship, and Chen became his most important deputy. However, when the Second Revolution against Yuan Shikai failed in 1913, Chen, along with Bo Wenwei, fled to Japan, disillusioned with the outcome and the co-optation of revolutionary ideals by former allies.

== New Culture Movement ==
The failure of the 1911 Revolution left Chen Duxiu, like many other revolutionaries, disheartened. He briefly contemplated retiring from political life, expressing these sentiments in poems published in 1915 where he compared his lonely path to that of ancient figures who withdrew from worldly affairs. However, between 1915 and 1922, Chen returned to the forefront of political and intellectual life, initiating and leading what became known as the New Culture Movement (also closely associated with the May Fourth Movement), which aimed to galvanize Chinese youth and transform the old order.

=== Dean of the New Culture and New Youth ===
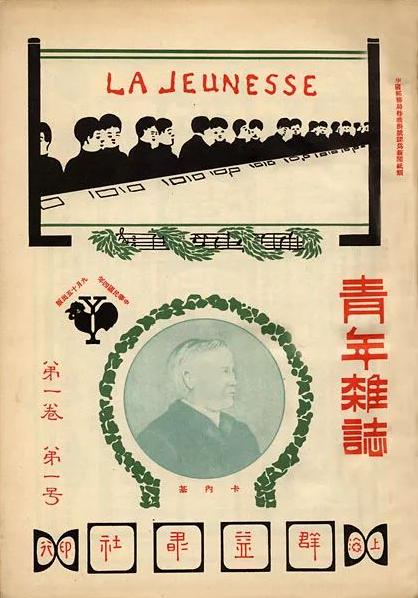
Cover of the first issue of Youth Magazine (later New Youth), 1915

Chen's main platform for the New Culture Movement was the magazine New Youth (Chinese: 新青年; pinyin: Xīn Qīngnián), which he founded in Shanghai in September 1915, initially under the title Youth Magazine (Chinese: 青年杂志; pinyin: Qīngnián Zázhì). Chen's opening essay, "Call to Youth" (Chinese: 敬告青年; pinyin: Jìnggào Qīngnián), set the tone for the movement, urging young people to be: "Independent, not servile. Progressive, not conservative. Aggressive, not retiring. Cosmopolitan, not isolationist. Utilitarian, not formalistic. Scientific, not imaginative". This call for a "new youth" who would embody purity of spirit and actively transform society resonated deeply with a generation disillusioned with the old order and eager for change. In early 1917, Chen was appointed Dean of the School of Arts and Letters at Peking University by its chancellor, Cai Yuanpei. This position significantly enhanced his influence and provided New Youth with a prestigious base.

Through New Youth, Chen and his associates, including Hu Shi, Li Dazhao, Lu Xun, Qian Xuantong, Liu Fu, and Shen Yinmo (many of whom joined the editorial board in January 1918), launched a comprehensive critique of traditional Chinese culture and society. They championed science and democracy (often referred to as "Mr. Science" and "Mr. Democracy") as solutions to China's problems and advocated for a literary revolution to replace classical Chinese with the vernacular language. Chen contended that Mr. Science and Mr. Democracy should replace Confucian values. In Chen's view, only Mr. Science and Mr. Democracy "can save China from the political, moral, academic, and intellectual darkness in which it finds itself." Chen viewed superstition and religion as among the main reasons for China's "backwardness".

His advocacy for democracy was multifaceted: he championed it as a tool for national strength ("nation-oriented utilitarianism"), a means for individual happiness and fulfilment ("individual-oriented utilitarianism"), an inherent right ("autonomous value"), and the foundation for an international brotherhood of humankind ("international-cosmopolitanism").

=== Anti-religion and literary revolution ===
Two of the most significant crusades of the New Culture Movement, closely identified with New Youth and Chen Duxiu, were the anti-Confucian campaign and the vernacular revolution. These dramatically increased the magazine's circulation from 1,000 to 16,000 copies.

Chen's attacks on Confucianism, which intensified in late 1916, argued that Confucian ideals were intrinsically linked to monarchical government and incompatible with a republican constitutional system based on independence, equality, and freedom. He argued that traditional Chinese morality, particularly the "three bonds and five ethical relationships," fostered a submissive and slavish character that endangered China's survival in a world dominated by "powerful and authoritative" nations. He criticized Confucianism for its emphasis on social hierarchy ("classes") and argued that its concern for the family was a means of protecting the privileges of the nobility. He vehemently opposed efforts by figures like Kang Youwei to establish Confucianism as a state religion, asserting that such a move was anachronistic and that Europe had progressed by abolishing religious and monarchical absolutism simultaneously. Chen drew on kaozheng scholarship to argue that Confucianism was originally a non-religious utilitarian doctrine, thereby undermining Kang's traditionalist interpretations. The brief restoration of the Manchu dynasty by the warlord Zhang Xun in the summer of 1917, at Kang Youwei's urging, further fueled Chen's anti-Confucian stance.

The literary revolution advocated by New Youth was closely associated with the anti-Confucian campaign. While early issues of New Youth were written in a semi-classical style, Chen had long been interested in popularizing Western literary ideas and the vernacular. Following Hu Shi's modest proposals for literary reform in late 1916 and early 1917, Chen published his seminal article "On the Literary Revolution" (Chinese: 文学革命论; pinyin: Wénxué Gémìng Lùn) in February 1917. In it, he called for the overthrow of the "painted, powdered, and obsequious literature of the aristocratic few" and the creation of a "plain, simple, and expressive literature of the people"; the overthrow of stereotyped classicism in favor of fresh, sincere realism; and the overthrow of pedantic, obscure literature in favor of plain-speaking, popular social literature. He specifically attacked the Tongcheng and Xijiang literary factions, whose classical styles dominated the existing government and bureaucracy, as proponents of an "artificial noble class language". By converting New Youth to the vernacular, Chen made its radical ideas highly accessible to China's new youth, undermining the cultural authority of the old guard.

In 1919, Chen wrote "The True Meaning of Human Life," which criticised religious systems as being at odds with national progress. Chen condemned what he regarded as superstition, and sought to debunk Confucianism, Daoism, and Christianity in the article.

=== Political engagement and the May Fourth Incident ===
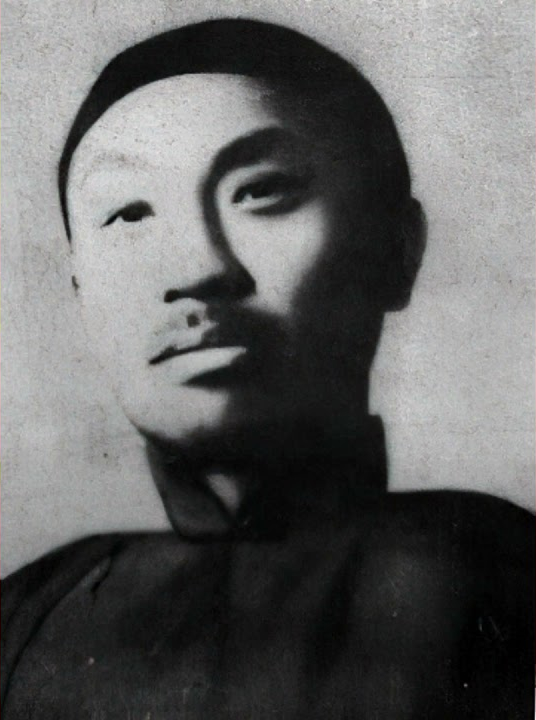
Chen during his time teaching at Peking University, 1917–1919

In founding New Youth, Chen declared that the journal would avoid direct political involvement, a stance he maintained until 1919. He believed that political change was futile without a prior transformation in culture and consciousness, arguing in 1916 that "politics produced only tyranny" in the absence of a "spirit of constitutional government". Nevertheless, he remained politically active. In the spring of 1916, he suspended publication of New Youth to assist Zhang Shizhao in an anti–Yuan Shikai military council in Guangdong. After Yuan's death, he participated in organizing a constitutional assembly in Shanghai. His views on China's involvement in World War I shifted with the political currents, initially praising German anti-imperialism, then supporting China's entry on the Allied side, and finally criticizing Prime Minister Duan Qirui's government for using the war to consolidate power.

In December 1918, Chen, along with Li Dazhao, began publishing the Weekly Critic (Chinese: 每周评论; pinyin: Měizhōu Pínglùn), a more overtly political journal which allowed him to comment on current events without the restrictions of the New Youth editorial board. He initially expressed hope in U.S. President Woodrow Wilson's ideals to end extraterritoriality and warlordism in China but became increasingly disillusioned. This period was marked by what has been called his "militant hostility" toward the status quo, an intense hatred of reality that fueled his search for drastic solutions. Conservative forces in Beijing, alarmed by Chen's influence, began to exert pressure. In March 1919, Chen resigned his deanship at Peking University to shield the institution from government interference.

On 4 May 1919, the May Fourth Incident erupted, with students protesting the allied powers' decision to transfer German concessions in Shandong to Japan through the Versailles treaty, instead of returning the territory to China. Chen actively supported the students and was arrested on 11 June while distributing leaflets. He was imprisoned for 83 days, accused of publishing Bolshevik materials. After his release, he resigned his professorship and, warned of impending re-arrest, fled Beijing for Shanghai, where he began the process of forming the Chinese Communist Party (CCP). Chen's political arguments during the New Culture period were often presented through cultural and philosophical critiques, partly due to government censorship, but also because this was a traditional mode of political debate in China. His core aim remained the preservation and strengthening of the Chinese nation and people. Mao Zedong would later refer to Chen as the "commander-in-chief" of the May Fourth Movement, a testament to Chen's pivotal role during this period.

== Founding the Chinese Communist Party ==
Chen Duxiu's decision to form the CCP marked a pivotal moment in modern Chinese history. His prestige among Chinese youth, cultivated during the New Culture Movement, was a critical factor in the party's early development. Mao Zedong acknowledged Chen's foundational role, stating in 1945 that those present at the Seventh Party Congress were Chen's "students".

=== Turn to Marxism and early socialist ideas ===
Chen's attraction to Marxism developed in a context of widespread pessimism about Western bourgeois democracy following World War I and the disappointment of the Treaty of Versailles. Like Liang Qichao, who had returned from Europe denouncing the "omnipotence of science", many Chinese intellectuals began to question Western material progress. Chen, however, defended the importance of science while seeking alternatives to Western capitalism. His commitment to democratic ideals led him to conclude that established liberal democracies failed to live up to their own values. He came to see socialism as a "more 'democratic' type of democracy" which could extend democratic rights to the laboring majority.

Prior to fully embracing Marxism, Chen explored various socialist and anarchist doctrines. As early as 1915, he had praised socialism as one of the most advanced intellectual tendencies of modern Western civilization, alongside human rights and evolution. However, he maintained that socialism was not yet applicable to China, writing in 1917 that "because [China's] industry is not yet flourishing, socialism cannot yet be put into effect."

Writing in New Youth in 1917, Chen contended that political reform in China required breaking with the supernatural elements of the literary tradition.

In 1919 and 1920, he showed interest in diverse ideas, including the Japanese socialist Mushanokoji Saneatsu's new village movement, Christian socialism as advocated by Korean independence activists, John Dewey's guild socialism, and the Work-and-Learning Mutual Assistance Corps. He even briefly advocated for the adoption of Christianity in China in February 1920, seeing in it a "faith that overcomes material spirit" and a source of sincerity and idealism lacking in Chinese culture, while also using it to critique Western imperialism and militarism. According to Ting Guo, Chen and other young intellectuals believed that elements of Christianity could contribute to China's social regeneration and scientific development; in the late Chinese Civil War, Christianity became associated with the Kuomintang (KMT) and westerism. These explorations reflected his consistent search for ideologies that emphasized sincere, non-self-interested behavior and group solidarity, which he believed could industrialize China without the perceived evils of Western capitalism.

In the spring of 1919, he first wrote favorably of the Bolsheviks, viewing them as representing a "new historical tide" and a "new and better morality". By the spring of 1920, he had embraced Marxist ideas, arguing that benevolent treatment of workers was insufficient; what was needed was recognition of their renge (human dignity) as independent persons and masters. The Karakhan Manifesto of March 1920, in which the Soviet government renounced former Czarist rights in China, significantly enhanced the moral standing of the Bolsheviks in Chen's eyes and solidified his attraction to their model.

=== Formation of the CCP and Comintern influence ===
While other intellectuals discussed socialist ideas, Chen took the decisive step of forming a political party. He was the first to recognize that the Bolsheviks provided an organizational model for implementing socialism in China without relying on existing political forces. His initial conception of the CCP was less a tool for seizing power, as Vladimir Lenin envisioned, and more an organization for building a new society and economy in China.

Comintern representatives played a crucial role in the CCP's formation. In the spring of 1920, Grigori Voitinsky, secretary of the Comintern's Department for Eastern Affairs, arrived in Shanghai and met with Chen, explaining the structure and purpose of a communist party and helping draft a program. With Comintern assistance, Chen established the first official Communist group in Shanghai in May 1920, consisting of seven members, and a provisional Central Committee. By August, a Communist Youth League was formed, and the nascent party began propaganda work, with Chen founding the workers' magazine Lao-tung chieh (The World of Labor). Chen wrote to Li Dazhao and Mao Zedong urging them to establish branches in Beijing and Hunan, respectively, and personally went to Guangzhou to organize the local cell. This led to the establishment of the slogan "Nan-Ch'en, Pei-Li" (Chen in the South and Li in the North), reflecting their respective leadership roles.

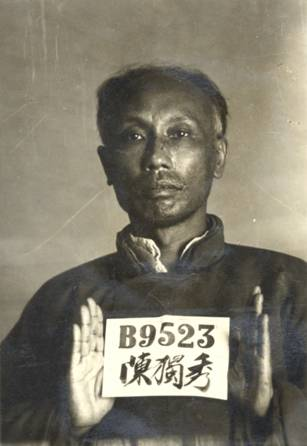
Chen after his arrest in Shanghai, 1921

Initially, Chen was wary of Comintern dominance and, along with other early CCP leaders, resisted offers of financial aid. However, after being arrested in the French Concession in Shanghai in 1921, he became more amenable to Comintern support and subsidies, recognizing the party's vulnerability. Despite this, he was sensitive to any perceived overreach by Comintern agents, such as Maring (Henk Sneevliet), particularly regarding party organization and relations with the KMT. Chen envisioned the CCP as a party of the "elite" – dedicated and sincere youth – who would lead the proletariat. He opposed a strong, dominant party chief, preferring that the General Secretary be elected by and responsible to committee heads, a system similar to the KMT's structure after Sun Yat-sen's ouster from absolute power in Canton in 1922, an action Chen had supported. Early CCP membership even included non-Marxist socialists and anarchists.

=== Ideological foundations and early party line ===
Chen's Marxism was shaped by his pre-existing concerns and his interpretation of China's needs. He saw Marxist scientific socialism as an optimistic doctrine that could combat pessimism and provide a path for China's progress, similar to his earlier advocacy of science. He believed that China could use socialism to develop education and industry, thereby avoiding the "mistakes of capitalism" and achieving rapid industrialization. This differed from orthodox Marxism, which posited capitalism as a necessary stage before socialism. Chen argued that while a political democratic revolution (led by the bourgeoisie) might occur first, the subsequent economic revolution (socialist construction) would be led by the proletariat.

He was initially wary of the concept of class dictatorship but came to defend it as necessary for the transition period after the revolution, to curb bourgeois exploitation and resolve social conflicts. His emphasis was on the moral qualities of the revolutionaries, viewing "revolution as the work of saints", a perspective that, while infused with Confucian-influenced belief in the power of pure intentions, differed from Lenin's more pragmatic focus on organizational tools for seizing power. Chen believed in the necessity of an organized party of professionals to lead the proletariat but continued to view party members primarily as moral exemplars rather than mere bureaucrats.

== United Front ==
The First United Front between the CCP and the KMT, formed under Comintern pressure, became a period of immense ideological and organizational challenge for Chen Duxiu and the nascent CCP.

=== Difficulties of an independent party and Comintern pressure ===
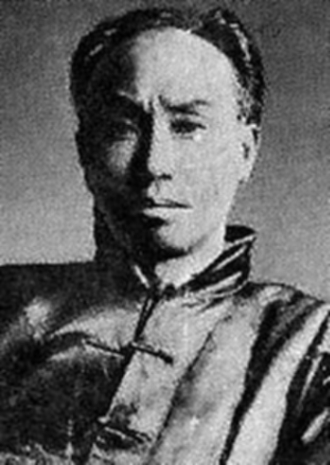
Chen Duxiu in the 1920s

Initially, Chen was insistent on maintaining the CCP's independence. However, the political realities of a fractured China, coupled with his party's vulnerability, led him to accept Comintern financial assistance and, eventually, its strategic directives. In August 1922, at a special plenary session of the CCP Central Committee at West Lake in Hangzhou, the Comintern delegate Maring pressed for CCP members to join the KMT as individuals. Chen and the entire Central Committee—including Li Dazhao, Zhang Guotao, Cai Hesen, and Gao Junyu—initially opposed this "bloc within" strategy, fearing it would confuse class organizations and compromise the CCP's independent policy. However, when Maring framed it as a matter of international discipline, the CCP leadership reluctantly acquiesced. Chen secured a concession that Sun Yat-sen revoke the KMT rule requiring personal loyalty oaths and fingerprints, and reorganize the KMT on democratic principles.

Despite the Hangzhou decision, the CCP initially pursued an alternative alliance with the northern warlord Wu Peifu, moving its headquarters to Beijing in late 1922. This strategy collapsed after Wu Peifu's bloody suppression of the Hankow-Beijing Railway Workers Union on 7 February 1923, which decimated the CCP's northern branch. Concurrently, Sun Yat-sen had re-established his government in Guangzhou in February 1923. These shifts made the KMT a more viable partner, and Chen began to support the United Front strategy more actively. At the Third CCP Congress in Guangzhou in June 1923, the "bloc within" policy was officially approved, with Chen himself proposing that CCP members join the KMT to help it expand among workers and peasants. He insisted, however, on keeping CCP headquarters in Shanghai, away from direct KMT influence in Guangzhou.

=== Theoretical confusion and internal CCP dynamics ===
The United Front policy was underpinned by significant theoretical confusion, largely stemming from Comintern interpretations of Marxist–Leninist doctrine for colonial and semi-colonial countries. Lenin had advocated for alliances with bourgeois nationalist movements to expel imperialism, but the Comintern's application of this to China—particularly Maring's formulation of the KMT as a "four-class party" (intelligentsia, liberal democratic bourgeoisie, petty bourgeoisie, and workers)—was problematic and lacked a clear basis in Marxist theory. Chen initially objected to this, insisting the KMT was a party of the bourgeoisie, but was overruled by Maring, who cited the small size of the Chinese proletariat and the demands of international discipline.

Chen's own understanding of the revolutionary stages was evolving. He accepted the necessity of a bourgeois democratic revolution led by the KMT, arguing from an orthodox Marxist perspective that revolution was produced by objective conditions, not subjective desires, and China was not yet ready for a proletarian revolution. The victory of this "national revolution," he declared, would "naturally be the victory of the bourgeoisie." While accepting the capitalist nature of the national revolution, he asserted that under "special circumstances" the proletariat might seize political power, depending on its strength and the international situation. By December 1924, influenced by Peng Shuzhi, Chen argued that in countries oppressed by imperialism, the proletariat must assume leadership even in the bourgeois revolution. In October 1925, he proposed that the CCP quit the KMT, but this was rejected due to strong Comintern support for the alliance.

Soviet advisers, notably Mikhail Borodin, increasingly usurped Chen's control over party matters, particularly in the CCP's Guangzhou branch, which Borodin compared favorably to the "less disciplined Shanghai apparatus run by Chen". Despite Chen's warnings, Borodin pushed for a leftward tilt within the KMT to strengthen Communist influence, which instead alienated the KMT right wing.

=== Breakdown of the United Front and Chen's removal ===
The 20 March Incident in 1926, where Chiang Kai-shek purged Communists from KMT leadership and military positions, was a clear sign of the KMT's perfidy in Chen's eyes. Chen and the Central Committee requested arms from the Comintern to support an independent peasant and worker movement, but were refused. Despite his opposition to the Northern Expedition, Chen was surprised by its initial successes and the opportunities it created for mass agitation. However, as Chiang's power grew, Chen, alarmed by anti-Communist sentiments, suggested arming Shanghai workers to resist Chiang before the Shanghai Massacre on 12 April 1927, but Comintern's contradictory instructions prevented effective action.

Following the Shanghai Massacre, Chen, then in Wuhan with the KMT left wing led by Wang Jingwei, again advocated for CCP independence from the Guomindang. When this failed, he resigned from his leadership position in mid-June 1927. On 15 July, Wang Jingwei also turned on the Communists. At an emergency CCP conference on 7 August 1927, Chen was made the scapegoat for the United Front's failure. He was condemned for "right-wing opportunism" and officially removed as General Secretary. He was blamed for refusing Joseph Stalin's supposed instructions to arm the workers and peasants, though in reality, the Comintern had provided no significant arms to the CCP.

== In opposition ==
Cast out of the CCP leadership, Chen Duxiu retreated from active politics, turning to philological research, a familiar solace in times of despair. He had lost his two eldest sons and close comrades in the United Front's collapse and was now targeted by the Soviet Union as an opportunist. The student youth he had championed now largely resented his "patriarchal" leadership.

=== Turn to Trotskyism and expulsion from the CCP ===
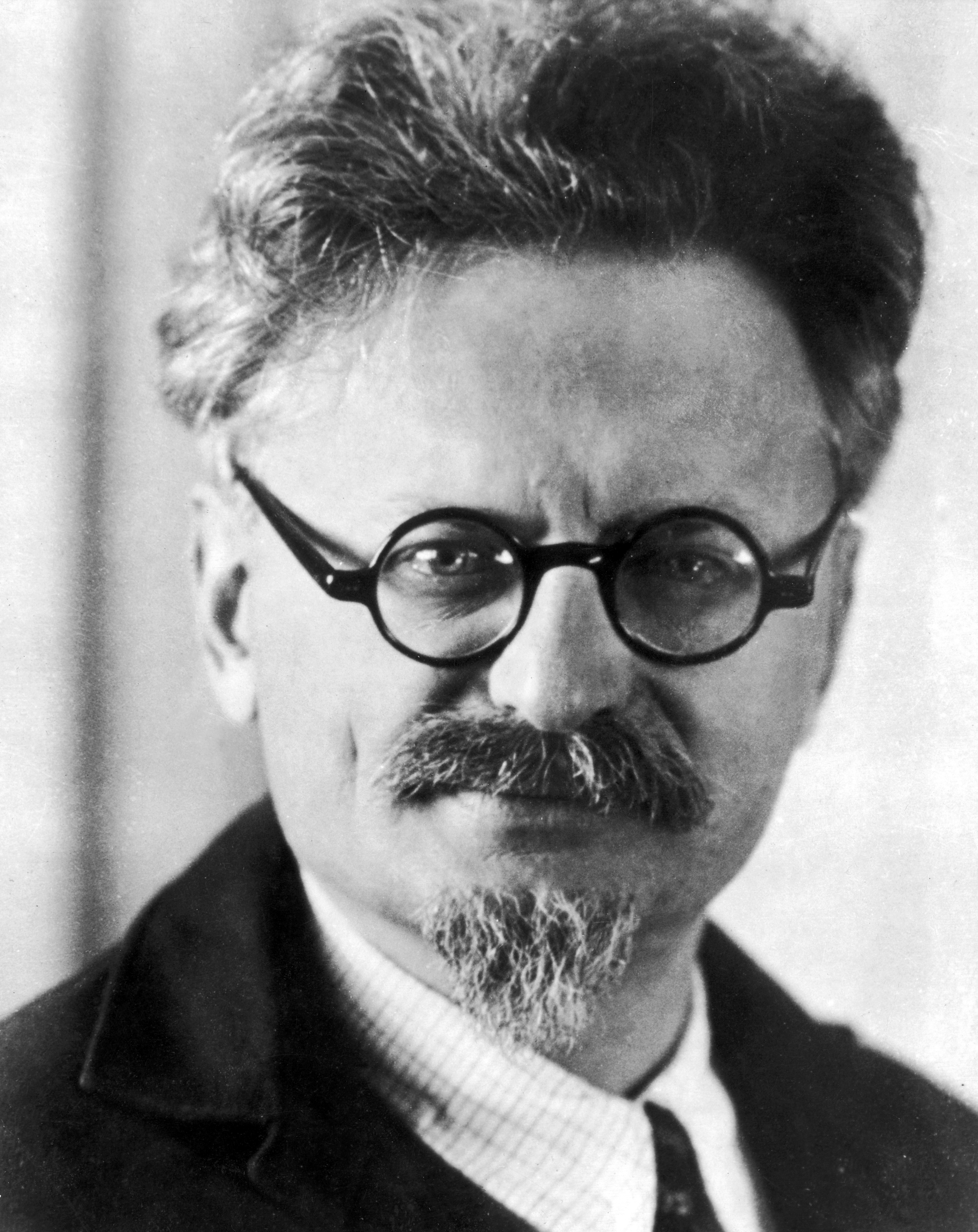
Leon Trotsky

By late 1928 or early 1929, Chen was introduced to the ideas of Leon Trotsky through Chinese students returning from Moscow. Trotsky's writings, which explained why Chen had been made a scapegoat for Soviet policy and reconfirmed many of Chen's own earlier ideas about revolution in China—such as the need for an independent political party and democratic slogans to engage the masses—resonated deeply with him. By the spring of 1929, Chen, along with his chief lieutenant Peng Shuzhi, had obtained and studied key Trotskyist documents, finding Trotsky's analysis of the CCP's mistakes persuasive and in "complete accordance" with his own views. They began to organize a "leftist opposition faction within the party".

Chen's growing sympathy for Trotskyism became evident in July 1929 following Soviet–Chinese clashes over the Chinese Eastern Railway. The CCP Central Committee, under Soviet pressure, called to "Defend the Soviet Union with Arms". Chen, in a series of three letters, criticized this slogan as alienating Chinese nationalist sentiment. More significantly, he echoed Trotskyist positions: the revolutionary tide had ebbed, and the party should focus on gradually re-engaging the masses by exposing the KMT's sham democracy and the dangers of imperialism. He also adopted Trotsky's analysis that feudal relations had essentially ended in China with the Qin dynasty, replaced by "bureaucratic feudalism", which itself had largely ended with the Chiang Kai-shek regime. The next stage, he argued, following Trotsky's theory of permanent revolution, could be a direct socialist revolution after a worker-peasant democratic victory, bypassing a distinct bourgeois phase.

Chen's open endorsement of Trotskyist views, particularly his critique of the CCP's "blind adventurism" and his call for internal party democracy, led to his expulsion. The CCP leadership, alarmed by his formation of an opposition faction, issued a resolution in June 1929 condemning "residual opportunism" (Chen Duxiu) joining with the Trotskyist opposition. After Chen refused a final C.C. offer to write an attack on the Trotskyists, he, Peng Shuzhi, and their followers were expelled from the CCP on 15 November 1929. Many influential CCP leaders had argued against his expulsion, and there was sympathy for some of Chen's positions. However, Chen's inability to control the CCP's organizational infrastructure, despite his intellectual influence, made him a victim of the party he had created. His expulsion marked the end of a more democratic tradition within the CCP.

=== Leader of the Chinese Left Opposition ===
After his expulsion, Chen became the leader of the Chinese Trotskyist movement. On 25 December 1929, he and his supporters issued "Our Political Views", a statement attacking the Stalinist leadership of the CCP. His faction, the Proletarian Society, became the largest of several Trotskyist groups. Differences among these groups, often generational and personal as much as ideological, centered on issues like the constituent assembly slogan and the nature of the coming revolution. Chen, siding with the "Our Word" group on some issues, largely followed Trotsky's tactical advice in trying to unify these factions.

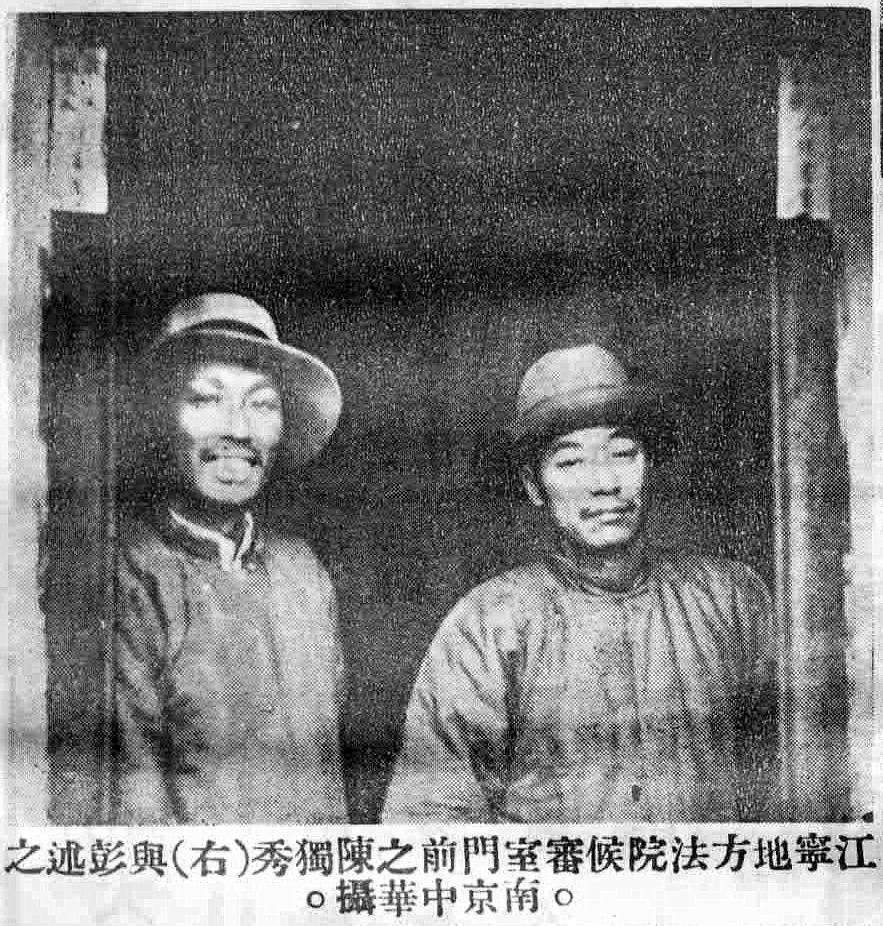
Chen (left) and Peng Shuzhi after their arrest in 1932

During this period, Chen advocated for an urban-based revolution led by the proletariat, appealing to their democratic and patriotic consciousness. He criticized the CCP's move to the countryside and its rural-based Red Army as a lumpenproletariat revolution. The Trotskyists, including Chen, made significant efforts to organize urban workers.

A unified Left Opposition congress was finally held in Shanghai in May 1931, with Chen Duxiu again heading the new Central Committee. However, disgruntled delegates tipped off the KMT secret police, leading to the arrest of most of the leadership over the next two months. Chen Duxiu, Peng Shuzhi, and some other leaders managed to evade capture for a year, continuing to organize urban workers, particularly after the Mukden Incident in September 1931, seeing themselves as the only viable force willing to fight both Japanese imperialism and domestic reactionary and Stalinist currents.

Chen Duxiu, Peng Shuzhi, and other remaining leaders were arrested by KMT forces on 15 October 1932, effectively ending the Trotskyists as a serious political force in China and concluding Chen's political career.

== Later life, imprisonment, and death ==
Chen's trial in 1933 became a platform for him to eloquently defend his actions. He admitted to opposing the Kuomintang government but argued this was to aid China by eliminating an organization that failed to defend against Japanese aggression and suppressed basic freedoms. Under public pressure, he was sentenced to thirteen years in prison rather than death, on 29 April 1933. He received favorable treatment in prison, sharing a special ward with Peng Shuzhi, and was allowed to continue his philological research and begin his autobiography.

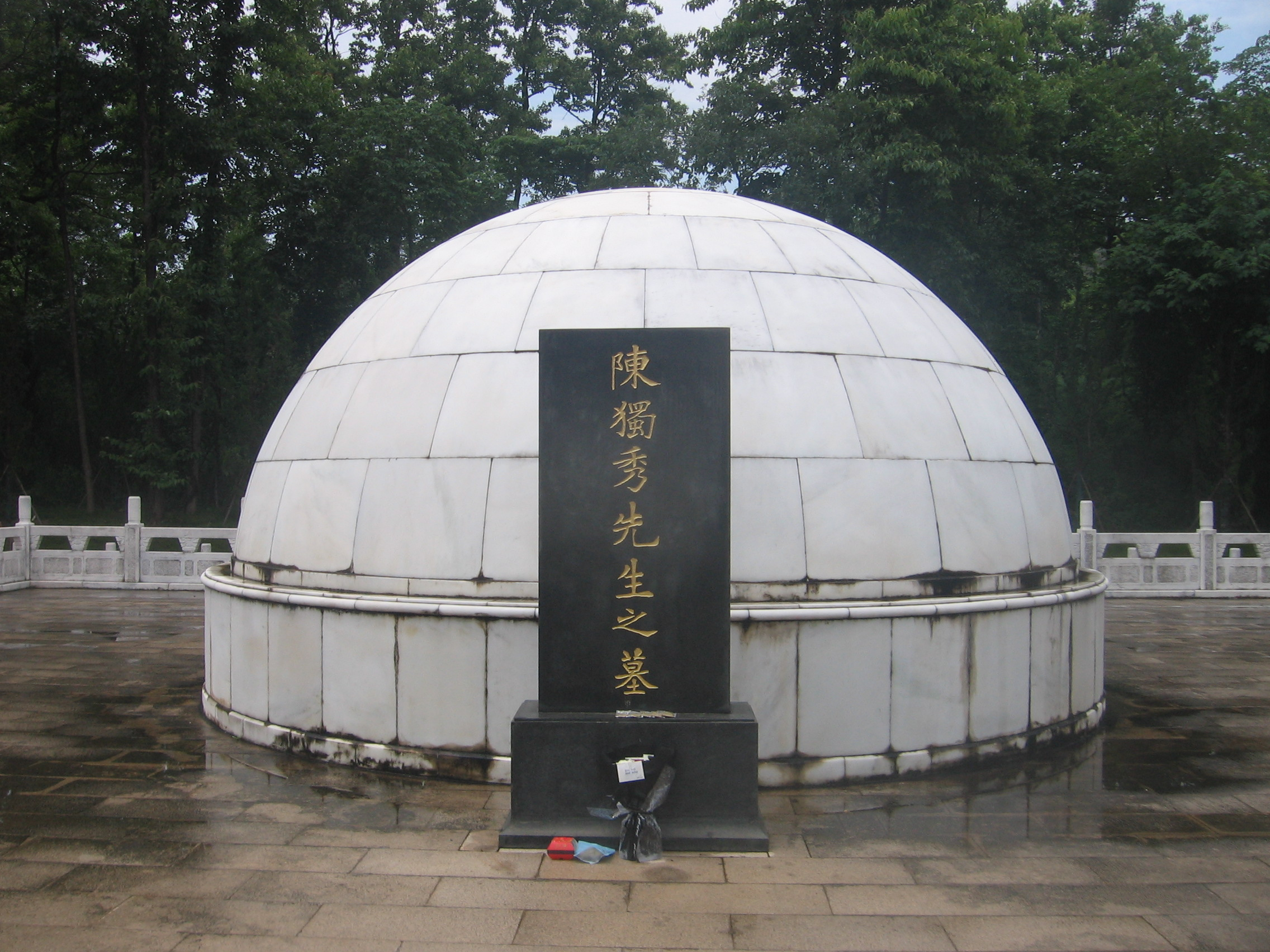
Tomb of Chen Duxiu in Anqing, Anhui, China.

Chen was released from prison on 8 August 1937, nine years early, due to the formation of the Second United Front between the KMT and CCP following the outbreak of the Second Sino-Japanese War. Negotiations for Chen to rejoin the CCP, initiated by his former disciple Luo Han and involving Mao Zedong, ultimately failed. While Mao offered Chen reentry if he renounced Trotskyism and admitted past mistakes, Chen found the terms unacceptable, and a smear campaign launched by the Stalinist CCP faction led by Wang Ming, accusing Chen of being a Japanese traitor, made reconciliation impossible.

Chen spent his final years in Jiangjin, Sichuan, having fled the Japanese invasion. He lived simply, accompanied by his third wife, Pan Lanzhen (潘蘭珍), his stepmother, older sister, and third son, Chen Songnian. He continued to write, expressing increasingly conservative political views and, according to Hu Shi, underwent a "late-in-life reconvert to democracy". His main focus, however, was completing his dictionary of etymological reconstructions, which he hoped would aid the romanization of the Chinese language. Suffering from high blood pressure and heart disease, Chen Duxiu died on 27 May 1942, at the age of 62. He was a tragic and disillusioned figure who had spent his last years vainly attempting to reconcile Marxism with his pre-Marxian democratic faith.

== Legacy and perspectives ==
In CCP historiography, Chen Duxiu's role has often been minimized, portraying him as an "arch-renegade". Since the 1980s, there has been a revival of interest in Chen in China, with some questioning the official narratives surrounding his expulsion from the CCP and acknowledging his profound influence on the course of modern Chinese history. His legacy is seen in the continuing tradition of student activism and the persistent desire for democratic reforms within China, often championed by those in cultural and literary circles who see themselves as heirs to the New Culture spirit he fostered.

Lee Feigon's 1983 study of Chen Duxiu offers a significant reinterpretation of his life and thought, challenging prevailing scholarly views, particularly those that characterized Chen primarily as a Westernizer alienated from Chinese tradition. Feigon argues that Chen's revolutionary impact stemmed precisely from his deep immersion in and ability to manipulate Chinese tradition, even as he attacked its more oppressive aspects. Unlike scholars such as Benjamin Schwartz, who saw Chen as an "all-out Westernizer" during the New Culture Movement, Feigon contends that Chen's cosmopolitanism was often "skin-deep" and that he remained an ardent nationalist throughout much of his career.

Feigon highlights that Chen's attraction to iconoclastic Western ideas was often preceded by an interest in similar iconoclastic strains within Chinese thought itself, such as the kaozheng school or the ideas of National Essence scholars like Zhang Binglin. His turn to various ideologies, from democracy and science to different forms of socialism and finally Marxism, was consistently driven by a desire to find effective means to preserve the "Chinese national essence", which for Chen fundamentally meant the material well-being and security of the Chinese people. His New Culture Movement ideas were often a repudiation of former radical associates who had, in his view, abandoned the cause of further change after 1911.

Chen's leadership style, drawing on the traditional authority of the teacher and scholar, was crucial in mobilizing Chinese youth. He was, as Feigon puts it, a "Mandarin of the new culture", adept at using cultural critiques for political ends. However, this reliance on personal prestige and intellectual authority proved insufficient for managing the disciplined, bureaucratic party structure that emerged with Comintern influence, contributing to his eventual downfall. Feigon compares Chen to Moses, a spiritual leader who could guide his people to the "promised land" but was not destined to enter it himself, lacking the organizational ruthlessness of a Lenin or a Mao.

== See also ==
- New Culture Movement
- May Fourth Movement
- Chinese Communist Revolution
- History of the Chinese Communist Party

Party political offices
Preceded by None	Leader of the Chinese Communist Party; 1921–1927	Succeeded by Xiang Zhongfa
