= Nos Annees Francaises =

- Traditional Chinese: 我們的法蘭西歲月
- Simplified Chinese: 我们的法兰西岁月
- Hanyu Pinyin: Wǒmēn dě Fǎlánxī Suìyuè
- Genre: Historical
- Written by: Li Kewei
- Directed by: Kang Honglei
- Starring: Zhu Yawen; Zhong Qiu; Zhang Nianhua; Lyu Xia; Wang Fang; Li Zimo; Liu Zhiyang
- Country of origin: China
- Original language: Mandarin
- No. of seasons: 1
- No. of episodes: 31

Production
- Executive producers: Chen Hui; Jing Zhigang
- Production location: France
- Production companies: Jiangsu Broadcasting Corporation; Communication Centre of Chinese Communist Youth League

Original release
- Network: CCTV-1
- Release: June 26 – July 14, 2012

Nos Annees Francaises (Chinese: 我们的法兰西岁月) is a 2012 Chinese historical TV series directed by Kang Honglei and written by Li Kewei. It stars Zhu Yawen, Zhong Qiu, Li Liang, Zhang Nianhua, Lyu Xia, Wang Fang, Li Zimo, and Liu Zhiyang. It was first broadcast on June 26, 2012 on CCTV-1.

== Synopsis ==
In 1912, after the establishment of the Republic of China (1912-1949), some young students witness the invasion of China by the Imperialist countries, they decides to find a way to save the country. Li Shizeng, Wu Yuzhang, Wu Zhihui, Zhang Ji organize the Organization of the "Work-Study Program in France" (留法俭学会). Zhou Enlai, Deng Xiaoping, Zhao Shiyan, Cai Hesen, Xiang Jingyu, Wang Ruofei, Chen Yannian, Chen Qiaonian, Chen Yi, Nie Rongzhen, Li Fuchun, Li Weihan, Li Lisan, Cai Chang, Fu Zhong, He Changgong, Xiao San, and others win the opportunity to study abroad. They see the achievements of European Industrial Revolution and the Second Industrial Revolution in France. They realize that only science and democracy could save China, and point out the direction for their later revolutionary cause.

== Cast ==
=== Main ===
- Zhu Yawen as Zhou Enlai
- Zhong Qiu as Deng Xiaoping
- Li Liang as Zhao Shiyan
- Zhang Nianhua as Cai Hesen
- Lyu Xia as Xiang Jingyu
- Dai Xu as Chen Qiaonian
- Zhang Feng as Chen Yannian
- Wang Fang as Nie Rongzhen
- Li Zimo as Li Lisan
- Liu Zhiyang as Li Fuchun
- Yi Junzheng as Chen Yi
- Wu Xiaodan as Cai Chang
- Yin Hang as Zhang Ruoming
- Huang Chao as Wang Ruofei
- Yuan Wenkang as Zeng Xuzhi

=== Supporting ===
- Pierre-François Métayer as the factory chief
- Li Yike as Li Huolian
- Ma Xiaocan as Chen Gongpei
- Deng Sha as Luo Yapin
- Wu Di as He Changgong
- Tang Yinuo as Deng Shaosheng
- Zhang Guoqiang as Zhang Shenfu
- Tian Xiaojie as Cai Yuanpei
- Fang Yi'an as Deng Yingchao
- Pierre Mirochnikoff as The French Ministry of Foreign Affairs

== Music ==
No.	Title	Lyrics	Music	Singers	Length
1.	"The Road is Long (《前路其修远》)" (Opening theme)	Jia Ding	Guo Dingli	Han Lei

== Awards ==
Year	Award	Category	Result	Notes
2013	29th Flying Apsaras Awards	First-class of Outstanding Television Award	Won	
2014	27th China TV Golden Eagle Awards	Outstanding Television Award	Won	
