= 27th Golden Eagle Awards =

Chinese TV awards ceremony in 2014

The 27th Golden Eagle Awards (simplified Chinese: 第27届中国电视金鹰奖; traditional Chinese: 第27屆中國電視金鷹獎) took place in Changsha, Hunan, China, on October 12, 2014.

== Winners ==
Best Television Series	Best Director
Jiao Yulu; Find the Path	Zhao Baogang–To Elderly With Love; Liu Jiang–Let's Get Married
Favorite Actor	Favorite Actress
Wang Luoyong–Jiao Yulu; Zhang Jiayi–The Police Story in Yingpan Town; Lin Yongjian–Nie Rongzhen; Chen Yiheng–Under Changbai Mountains My Family	Liu Tao–To Elderly with Love; Sun Li–Hot Mom!; Hou Mengyao–The Legend of Mulan; Wang Weiwei–Angel Heart
Best Cinematography	Best Art Direction
Zhang Chaoying–The Qin Empire II: Alliance	Liu Yongqi–The Orphan of Zhao
Writing	Most Popular Actor(s)
Li Ting–Under Changbai Mountains My Family	Zhang Jiayi–The Police Story in Yingpan Town; Sun Li–Hot Mom!
Outstanding Television Series	Best Performing Art
The Qin Empire II: Alliance; Mao Zedong; Romance of Our Parents; Under Changbai Mountains My Family; Nie Rongzhen; Dancing Legend; Dog Stick; Mother, Mother; Heroes out of Sichuan; Mazu; To Elderly with Love; Nos Annees Francaises; Ye Wen; My Land, My Home; Direction of the Country; The Orphan of Zhao; Home; The Police Story in Yingpan Town; The Patriot Yue Fei	Wang Luoyong–Jiao Yulu; Liu Tao–To Elderly with Love
