= Cultural depictions of Yue Fei =

Cultural depiction

Yue Fei, a Chinese general of the Song dynasty remembered for his exploits in the Jin–Song wars, has appeared in various types of media; including black-and-white films, plays, games, wuxia novels, and folktales.

== Literature ==
Illustration of Yue Fei and his soldiers in the comic book The Legend of Zhou Tong

- Xiyoubu (西遊補; Supplement to Journey to the West, 1640), a Ming dynasty addendum to the classical novel Journey to the West, which takes place between the end of chapter 61 and the beginning of 62. In the novel, the Monkey King faces a representation of his own carnal desires and is trapped inside of a tower full of mirrors, each with its own powers. One mirror causes him to travel forward in time from the Tang to the Song dynasty. There, some junior devils appear and tell him that the ruler of the underworld King Yama has recently died of an illness and so Monkey must take his place until a suitable replacement can be found. Monkey ends up judging the fate of the recently deceased Prime Minister Qin Hui. He tortures Qin into confessing his sins. These tortures include having millions of embroidery needles shoved into his flesh, being ground into paste, thrown onto a mountain of swords and spears, hacked into bits, forced to drink human puss, and his rib cage ripped apart to give him the appearance of a dragonfly. A demon is charged with using his magic breath to "blow" Qin back into his proper form. Monkey finally sends a demon to heaven to retrieve a powerful magic gourd that sucks anyone who speaks before it inside and melts them down into a bloody stew. He uses this gourd for Qin's final punishment. Meanwhile, Monkey invites the ghost of Yue Fei to the underworld and takes him as his third master. (He claims this completes his lessons on the three religions since: 1) the immortal Subhodhi taught him Taoist magic; 2) the monk Tang Sanzang taught him Buddhist restraint; 3) Yue Fei taught him Confucian ideals.) He entertains Yue Fei until Qin Hui has been reduced to liquid and offers the general a cup of Qin's "blood wine". Yue, however, refuses on the grounds that drinking it would sully his soul. Monkey then does an experiment where he makes a junior devil drink of the wine. Sometime later, the devil, apparently under the evil influence of the blood wine, murders his personal religious teacher and escapes into the "gate of ghosts," presumably being reborn into another existence. Yue Fei then takes his leave to return to his heavenly abode. Monkey sends him off with a huge display of respect by making all of the millions of denizens of the underworld kowtow before him.
- China's Top Ten Classical Tragedy (中國十大古典悲劇), including a vignette of Yue Fei's grandson's quest to clear his late-grandfather's name.
- Shuo Yue Quanzhuan (說岳全傳; "The Story of Yue Fei", literally Telling the Complete Biography of Yue Fei), a novel based on Yue Fei's biography. It was written by Qian Cai (钱彩), who lived some time during the reigns of the Kangxi and Yongzheng emperors (1661–1735) of the Qing dynasty.
- Yue Fei Zhuan (岳飛傳; The Biography of Yue Fei), by wuxia writer Huanzhulouzhu This should not be confused with the historical biography of Yue Fei written during the Song dynasty, but compiled with other such biographies in the Yuan dynasty.
- Condor Trilogy (射鵰三部曲), a trilogy of novels by wuxia writer Louis Cha. Although Yue Fei does not appear in the stories, he is still revered by many of the characters as an ethnic hero. Yang Kang, the primary antagonist of The Legend of the Condor Heroes, is a descendant of Yang Zaixing, a subordinate of Yue Fei. The Book of Wumu (武穆遺書; Posthumous Writings of Wumu), a fictional military textbook written by Yue Fei, is also featured in the first and third novels. The book is hidden inside the titular Dragon Saber in The Heaven Sword and Dragon Saber. Guo Jing and Xu Da benefit from reading the book and using the military strategies detailed inside to defeat enemy armies.
- Yue Fei Lie Zhuan (岳飛列傳), a manhua series about Yue Fei's military exploits.
- Tiebi Jindao Zhou Tong Zhuan (鐵臂金刀周侗傳; Iron Arm, Golden Broadsword: The Biography of Zhou Tong) – Yue Fei appears as Zhou Tong's student in the last few chapters of Zhou's fictional biography.
- Zhou Tong Chuanqi (周侗傳奇; The Legend of Zhou Tong) – This lianhuanhua-style comic book is based on Zhou Tong's biography and has the same material about Yue Fei, but in picture form.
- Donald Duk, a 1991 novel by Frank Chin, includes a version of the story using the Cantonese spelling Ngawk Fay. Chin uses the version of the story in which Yue Fei's mother inscribes the tattoo on his back; Chin also uses the version of the story in which the married couple who betrays him are immortalized as the origin of a Chinese double doughnut, which is fried and cut open as a sign of the people's hatred for the couple's treachery toward him.
- River of Stars by Guy Gavriel Kay

== Film and television ==
Shortly after filming New Police Story in 2004, Jackie Chan reported that he would produce and play Yue Fei in a bioepic about the general's life. Jaycee Chan, Jackie Chan's son, will share the role as young Yue Fei. Jackie Chan said, “There's already a rough draft right now, we've even found a co-star. In fact, filming of Genghis Khan is also under consideration, but it must be a good script, because a lot of people have filmed this story, and the story itself is complicated and randomized, so up to now, there isn't a concrete plan yet. And [the script for] Yue Fei is nearly completed." He continues, "I think Yue Fei is a man with great sense of loyalty, so am I. I've been loyal to Golden Harvest, to friends and to my country!" Filming will not begin until Chan finishes filming several other projects (including Rush Hour 3), but he is willing to work for reduced pay so he can work with his son. This is because he believes the box office results will be good. However, director Stanley Tong says the role of Yue Fei could possibly go to Andy Lau.

=== Films ===
- Yue Fei (岳飛) (1940).
- Jin Zhong Bao Guo (盡忠報國 – Serve the Country Loyally) (1940). The name of this film comes from the tattoo on Yue Fei's back.
- Yue Fei Chu Shi (岳飛出世 – The Birth of Yue Fei) (1962). A 10-year-old Sammo Hung played young Yue Fei. This film was largely based on The Story of Yue Fei.
- The Twelve Gold Medallions (十二金牌) (1970). A Shaw Brothers production. Although Yue Fei does not appear in this film, the story revolves around another hero who is on a quest to intercept 12 Gold Medallions from reaching Yue Fei as they are part of a plot devised by the traitorous Prime Minister, Qin Hui, to recall Yue Fei back to the capital to be executed.

=== Television series ===
- by royal decree is a 1984 TV series from ATV.
- Eight Thousand Li of Cloud and Moon (TV series) (八千里路雲和月). A 40-episode Taiwanese television series about the life story of Yue Fei (played by Kenny Ho). It was aired from 1988 to 1989 on CTS.
- The Legend Of Yue Fei (岳飞传) is a 1994 television series with 20 episodes that was aired in Hong Kong. It told a dramatized story of Yue Fei's (portrayed by Norman Chui) life as a general of the Song dynasty in China.
- self-denial (孝感動天). A 1995 TVB television series including a vignette based on China's Top Ten Classical Tragedy, of a fictitious account of Yue Fei's (Newton Lai) grandson, Yue Ke (Marco Ngai), of his quest to clear his grandfather's name. In the series, the people of the Southern Song accuse Yue of being a traitor, due to the conspiracy of Qin Hui, the Emperor Gaozong of Song, and the Jin court. Yue Ke must also battle Qin's son Qin Xi (Law Lok Lam) to avenge his parents with aid from Qin's grandchildren (Vivian Lai and Lei Jiu Ging) and Emperor Xiaozong of Song (Leung Kin Ping).
- A Weaver on the Horizon (天涯織女) is a 2010 Chinese historical drama set during the Song-Yuan transition. Though the legendary general Yue Fei never appears, he serves as a cultural hero for the protagonist, Lin Mufei (Yuan Hong). Named by his father in honor of Yue’s patriotism, Mufei carries on his idol’s mission of defending the Song dynasty against Mongol invaders. Following the fall of the Jin dynasty, the Lin family continues the fight until Mufei is the sole survivor. In a symbolic blow to his cause, a stone tablet inscribed with Yue Fei's famous poem Man Jiang Hong is destroyed by the Mongol general Bayan of the Merkit. Mourning the final ruin of the Song and crushed under the weight of his own failures, Mufei abandoned the battlefield to the ghosts. Driven apart from master weaver Huang Qiao'er (Janine Chang) by irreconcilable differences, Mufei eloped with Princess Zhao Jiayi (Liu Shishi) to build a quiet life and revive his family line.
- The Patriot Yue Fei (精忠岳飛) is a 2013 television series based on the biography of Yue Fei. It will be the first Chinese historical television series to be broadcast on HBO. Huang Xiaoming stars as the titular character.
- Son of Hero (驚天岳雷) is a yet-to-be aired 48-episode Chinese wuxia television series produced by Shandong Film & Media Group. It is a fictional account centered on Yue Fei's surviving son, Yue Lei (Gavin Gao), who seeks revenge against those responsible for his family's plight after they murdered his father and brother, beginning a journey that ultimately shapes him into a hero in the jianghu. Li Man as Xia Yunfei, who is Yue Lei's love interest. Yue Fei also appears in flashbacks, portrayed by Yu Rongguang, who also played Yue Fei's martial arts teacher Zhou Tong in The Patriot Yue Fei. Wang Wei, who portrayed Wanyan Zongwang in The Patriot Yue Fei, plays Yue Fei's subordinate Wang Gui in the series, whose character serves as a mentor to the protagonist. Zhang Zijian portrays Qin Hui and Steven Ma as Emperor Gaozong of Song. Though the series finished shooting in 2016, it has not aired in China yet.

== Games ==
=== Boardgames ===
The "Yue Fei" card.

A Yue Fei card set was sold as part of five famous Chinese warriors — Guan Yu, Hua Mulan, Jie the Tyrant, Sun Tzu, and Yue Fei — in the "Chinese" section of the second set of world cultures produced by the Anachronism boardgame in June 2005. In July 2005, the card pack was used for a promotional offer where a person would receive it or a Robin Hood card pack if they sent in the UPC labels off of three warrior packs (from any culture) or one warrior and one starter set. In April 2006, the player could send in the UPC's of four warrior packs or two warrior packs and one starter to choose between promotional cards from sets two and three, which consisted of Yue Fei, Robin Hood, Siegfried or Black Hawk. However, with the release of the sixth set in August 2006, the Yue Fei and Robin Hood packs were no longer available.

Out of the Five Chinese Elements used to describe warrior attributes, Yue Fei is listed under water, which represents intelligence. He has eight life points, one speed point, three experience points, and one damage point. The main self-titled Yue Fei card (left) is the 46th card out the 100 produced for set two. The other four cards that make up the entire pack (#46-50/100) show various events from his life and military career. Card 47, titled Jin Cheng Bao Guo, depicts his mother giving him his famous tattoo on his back. Card 48, titled Dao, shows Yue blocking a Jurchen soldier's spear attack with a Chinese broadsword. Card 49, titled Hu Xiong Jia, depicts Yue using his armor's breastplate to deflect the spear attack of a Jurchen soldier, while simultaneously snapping the weapon's polearm with a palm strike. Card 50, titled Ba Duan Jin, depicts Yue teaching his soldiers the Eight Section Brocade qigong exercise that is often attributed to the general.

=== Video games ===
Independent gameplayers have produced a mod of Yue Fei from Sangokushi Sousouden.

Yue Fei is one of the 32 historical figures who appear as special characters in the video game Romance of the Three Kingdoms XI by Koei.

== Storytelling ==
Shuo Yue Quanzhuan is a favorite among Pingshu (評書) or Pinghua (評話) storytellers, which is a modern-day form of Shuoshu (說書) storytelling that became popular in the Tang and Song dynasties. One of the most famous of these artists is Liu Lanfang (b. 1944), a noted singer and actress. She first made a name for herself in 1972 when she sang the full-length script of Shuo Yue Quanzhuan. In September 1981, the Chunfeng Literature Publishing House published the 100-chapter pingshu script of Yue Fei's tale.

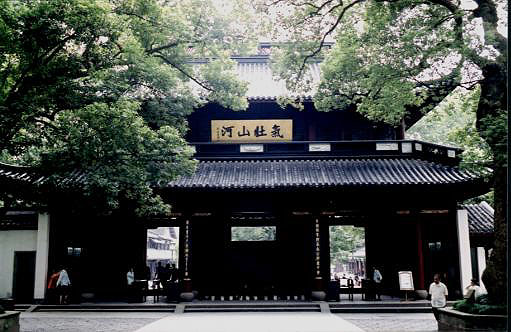
Yue Fei Memorial Hall

=== Yue Fei studies archery ===
According to You Er Hua Bao (幼兒畫報; Children's Pictorial Magazine), a Chinese magazine tailored for children ages two through seven, the young Yue Fei purchased a bow, a sword, and a spear to practice martial arts on his own since he did not have a teacher to train him properly. One day when he was chopping firewood, he passed by a village with a martial training hall ran by a famous master. Yue Fei immediately asked the master to become his student, not even knowing that this person was none other than Zhou Tong. Zhou told the boy, "Your skill in martial arts is inadequate, so you must first train your eyes."

As a part of his training, Yue Fei began to stare directly into the morning sunrise. At first the training was hard because the bright sunlight hurt his eyes, but he continued to practice the skill of the "far-sighted person" for many years. One day, Zhou came to Yue Fei and pointed to an object high up in the sky. When he focused his trained vision, Yue saw that it was a lone goose. Zhou then directed Yue to scan some trees that were one hundred paces away. Yue again focused his vision and caught sight of two black cicadas on a tree. Zhou then laughed in approval and said "Now that your eyesight is practiced, I not only accept you as my student, but also as my adopted son. I will now teach you martial arts."

Yue Fei practiced diligently and became a master of the eighteen weapons of war. He could draw a bow weighing 300 catties and, with a "whiz" of the arrow, shoot a leaf from 100 paces away. The moral of the story is that achievements are only made through diligent practice. It also warns that staring directly into the sun is very dangerous and could permanently damage the eyes.

=== The general and the water tank ===
When Yue Fei was born, there was a red auspicious glow around the Yue family residence so neighbors brought buckets of water to put out some perceived fire. However, they found out that Lady Yue had given birth to a son. With all the people crowded around their house, a Peng landed on the roof and spread its wings over the length of the entire residence. The bird then flew high into the sky and disappeared. The sight of the Chinese roc is why Yue's father named him Fei (飛; "fly").

Days after his birth, a monk warned Yue Fei's father to put his wife and newborn child inside of a water tank if the baby were to cry. Three days later, the baby began to cry, so Yue's father followed the monk's instructions. Then the Yellow River flooded and mother and child were swept to safety, whereas Yue's father drowned in the torrent. In his previous life, Yue had indeed been a Peng himself. He had blinded the eye of a mischievous dragon living within the Yellow River. So when the dragon heard his newly reborn enemy cry, he flooded the river to kill Yue and get his revenge, but failed.

Lady Yue raised Yue Fei on money that she saved up from doing sewing for the family who had saved them from the river and taken them into their home. When Yue Fei was 13, he entered a cave and found a monstrous snake sleeping by a stream. He picked up a rock and threw it at the beast. The snake lunged at him in anger, but Yue Fei dodged to one side and pulled on its tail with his supernatural strength. The snake instantly disappeared in a puff of smoke, leaving only a marvelous golden spear named the "Magic Spear of the Flowing Spring" (Chinese: 沥泉神矛; pinyin: Lìquán Shénmáo). He later found a military teacher who taught him how to wield the spear efficiently.

Yue eventually joined the army and became one of the most beloved heroes and martyrs in Chinese history. This story is a derivative of an episode from his fictional biography Shuo Yue Quanzhuan.

=== Qin Hui: The Stinker ===
After Yue Fei's execution, iron statues of Qin Hui, the man responsible for the general's execution; his wife Madam Wang; and two other accomplices were cast in iron and knelt outside Yue's memorial tomb as punishment for their deeds. During the Ming dynasty, the new provincial governor-general of Hangzhou, who was a direct descendant of Qin Hui and Madam Wang, had both iron statues thrown into the West Lake under cover of night. The next day, the lake turned pitch-black and stank of vomit. The townsfolk realized that the lake's condition coincided with the statues' disappearance. When the governor-general arrived on the scene, the people questioned him about his relationship with Qin Hui. As he knew the statues had sunk to the bottom of the lake, he boasted, "If anyone can really scoop the statues out of the lake, I'm waiting to resign and ask for punishment." At that exact moment, the murky water became clear and the statues drifted ashore as if propelled by an invisible force. The cowardly governor-general bolted for his carriage when he saw this miraculous sight. The townsfolk pelted his carriage with rocks as he fled, many of them ripping through the curtain, giving him huge lumps on his head. That night, the governor-general escaped from Hangzhou, never to be heard from again. Listen to this story

=== The mad monk sweeps Qin Hui out of the temple ===
During the Southern Song dynasty there were two famous Buddhists named the "Crazy Monk" Ji Gong and the "Mad Monk" Fengbo. Fengbo lived during the time of Yue Fei and became famous for "sweeping Qin Hui's face with a broom". The story is told after having Yue Fei imprisoned on false charges, Qin Hui went to Lingyin Temple to have his fortune read. There he was confronted by a laughing Fengbo who asked, "Cao Cao was once a big hero, but where is he today?" Qin Hui asked him what he meant in confusion. Fengbo said, "The principles of Heaven are clear. Loyalty and treachery are self-evident. Goodness and evil will be met with reward or retribution. You, as the Prime Minister, hold a lot of power. Why do you want to murder a man who is as important to the country as a pillar is to a house? Does the safety of the nation mean nothing to you?" Qin countered "Who is that pillar of the country?" "General Yue Fei!" screamed Fengbo. When Qin Hui seemed unaffected by his words, Fengbo laughed and said, "What a fool! Repent now before it is too late." He then grabbed a broom and raked it across Qin Hui's face and quickly ran off. Feeling embarrassed, Qin returned to the palace a defeated man.

The boldness of the monk caught the attention of the common folk. It is said he would appear in crowded areas and begin to sweep the floor, even in the cleanest of places, and proclaim "sweeping Qin" as a reminder to the people that they should band together to eliminate the traitor Qin Hui from office. The "Mad Monk" was later raised to the status of an arhat.

The statues of the "Mad and Crazy Monks" were often seen together in various temples throughout the Southern Song dynasty. There are two such statues of these arhats in the Daxiong Temple Hall of Zhantan Forest on Mount Jiuhua. One of them is the "Crazy Monk" Ji Gong in the form of a deity and the other is the "Mad Monk" Fengbo holding a duster in one hand and a broom under his left armpit, standing ever ready to give the wicked Prime Minister another sweep.

This is a derivative of an episode from Shuo Yue Quanzhuan, which mentions no "sweeping" at all. The fortuneteller's name was "Xie Renfu of Chengdu" and he told the fortunes of both Emperor Gaozong and Qin Hui, who were in disguise, in the Dragon's Intonation Monastery. When Qin returned to the palace he sent men to arrest the fortuneteller, but he had fled the city out of fear once he discovered who they really were.

== See also ==
- History of the Song dynasty
- Jurchen campaigns against the Song dynasty
- Timeline of the Jin–Song Wars
- Yue Fei Temple
- Tomb of Yue Fei
- Yue Fei
