= Eight Thousand Li of Cloud and Moon (TV series) =

- VCD cover art
- 八千里路雲和月
- Genre: Historical drama
- Written by: Ou Chun-tan; Tsung Hua
- Directed by: Tsung Hua
- Starring: Kenny Ho; Ivy Ling Po; Lu Fung; Jin Chao-chun; Fan Hung-hsuan
- Opening theme: "The River is Red" (滿江紅) by the Taipei Philharmonic Choir
- Ending theme: "God of War" (戰神)
- Composer: Huang Shih
- Country of origin: Taiwan
- Original language: Mandarin
- No. of episodes: 40

Production
- Producer: Tsung Hua
- Production location: Taiwan
- Running time: ≈45 minutes per episode
- Production company: CTS

Original release
- Network: CTS
- Release: 21 November 1988 – 13 January 1989

Eight Thousand Li of Cloud and Moon (八千里路雲和月) is a Taiwanese historical television series directed, produced and written by Tsung Hua. Starring Hong Kong actor Kenny Ho, it is based on the life of Yue Fei, a Song dynasty general widely regarded as a patriotic hero in Chinese culture for his role in the wars between the Song and Jin dynasties. The Chinese title of the series comes from a line in "The River is Red", a poem commonly attributed to Yue Fei. The series was first aired on CTS in Taiwan from 21 November 1988 to 13 January 1989.

== Synopsis ==
The series is set in 12th-century China during the wars between the Song and Jin dynasties.

Following the Jingkang incident in 1127 which saw the fall of the Song capital Kaifeng and the capture of the Song emperors Huizong and Qinzong by Jin forces, the Song dynasty has relocated and survived in southern China under the rule of Emperor Gaozong.

Song forces, led by Yue Fei and others, continue to struggle against the Jin invasion and regain lost ground. Besides having to fight with the enemy on the frontline, Yue Fei has to deal with internal threats posed by corrupt officials such as Qin Hui.

== Cast ==
- Kenny Ho as Yue Fei
- Ivy Ling Po as Lady Yao
- Hsu Pei-jung as Li Wa
- Lu Yih-lung as Niu Gao
- Chang Chen-huan as Wang Gui
- Wen Hsing as Zhang Xian
- Li Ya-min as Yue Yun
- Lan Wen-ching as Wang Zuo
- Lu Fung as Zhou Tong
- Tu Yung-hsien as Yue Lin
- Tu Yung-hsun as Yue Lei
- Tsai Tung-lin as Yue Ting
- Shih Chi-hsiang as Yue Zhen
- Tu Yung-fung as Yue Yinping
- Li Chia-hua as Anniang
- Jin Chao-chun as Qin Hui
- Fan Hung-hsuan as Emperor Gaozong of Song
- Lung Lung as Han Shizhong
- Fu Lei as Zong Ze
- Liu Hsiu-wen as Qin Hui's wife
- Chou Jui-fang as Liang Hongyu
- Li You-lin as Wan Siguo
- Chang Feng as Li Gang
- Mou Hsi-tsung as Lü Yihao
- Han Hsiang-chin as Consort Wei
- Cheng Shao-fung as Liu Yu
- Chiang Yang as Du Chong
- Yu Heng as Zhou Sanwei
- Chang Fu-chien as Wuzhu
- Wang Hsiang as Hamichi
- Hsu En-chia as Halitu
- Lung Hsuan as Dahan
- Pao Cheng-fang as Yelü Cheniang
- Chao Chiang as Langzhu
- Chen Fu-sheng as Wanyan Jinna
- Wang Tan as Dutina
- Hsieh Hsing as Yang Me
- Hsieh Shu-chun as Yang Ping
- Liu Lun as Liu Zhengshun
- Liu Yueh-ti as Yang Hua
- Wang Chun as Li Cheng
- Li Lung-yin as Jin Er

== See also ==
- Media about Yue Fei
- The Patriot Yue Fei
