= The Founding of a Party =

- Film poster
- Traditional Chinese: 建黨偉業
- Simplified Chinese: 建党伟业
- Hanyu Pinyin: Jiàn Dǎng Wěi Yè
- Directed by: Huang Jianxin; Han Sanping
- Written by: Dong Zhe; Guo Junli; Huang Xin
- Produced by: Han Sanping
- Cinematography: Wang Yan
- Edited by: Derek Hui
- Music by: Shu Nan; Ma Shangyou
- Production companies: China Film Group; DMG Entertainment
- Distributed by: China Film Group (mainland China); China Lion Film Distribution (International)
- Release date: 15 June 2011
- Running time: 118 minutes
- Country: China
- Language: Mandarin

The Founding of a Party, alternatively titled in English Beginning of the Great Revival for its international release, is a Chinese propaganda film released in 2011 to mark the 90th anniversary of the Chinese Communist Party. The film is directed by Huang Jianxin and Han Sanping, both of whom also worked on the related film, The Founding of a Republic, which features a star-studded cast of Chinese actors, including Andy Lau and Chow Yun-fat. The film was created by the state-owned China Film Group and depicts the formation of the Chinese Communist Party, beginning with the fall of the Qing dynasty in 1911 and ending with the Party's founding congress in 1921.

== Plot ==
During the early 20th century, China is marked by political disunity and a handful of individuals, including Mao Zedong, Li Dazhao, and Zhou Enlai, envision a unified China, especially in the political crises that followed the 1911 Xinhai Revolution, which ended centuries of dynastic rule in the country. After World War I, the Western Allies gave Qingdao and Jiaozhou Bay to the Empire of Japan at the Treaty of Versailles, stirring sentiments amongst China's youth, leading to the May Fourth Movement of 1919. In March 1920, Grigori Voitinsky comes to China in an attempt to spread communism to the Far East and, on 22 July 1921, 13 representatives from throughout China meet in a Shanghai's women's dormitory to found what would become the Chinese Communist Party.

== Cast ==
Actor	Role
Liu Ye	Mao Zedong
Chen Kun	Zhou Enlai
Li Qin	Yang Kaihui
Huang Jue	Li Da
Liao Fan	Zhu De
Chow Yun-fat	Yuan Shikai
Qi Yuwu	Wang Jinmei
Wang Xuebing	Bao Huiseng
Zhang Yishan	Deng Enming
Tong Ruixin	Chen Gongbo
Fan Zhibo	Cai Chang
Li Jing	Yuan Keding
Bai Bing	Lu Yin
Huang Lei	Cao Rulin
Du Chun	Xu Deheng
Wang Xinjun	Xu Chongzhi
Tao Zeru	Zhang Xun
Liu Yiwei	Duan Zhigui
Hou Yong	Tang Shaoyi
Zhao Lixin	Yang Mingzhai
Dai Xu	Yu Fangzhou
Li Qi	Lin Chenru's wife
Yang Yang	Yang Kaizhi
Yu Shaoqun	Mei Lanfang
Liu Peiqi	Gu Hongming
Zhang Xilin	Wang Zhengting
Leehom Wang	Luo Jialun
Ma Jing	Reporter
He Yunwei	French translator
Xu Haiqiao	Qu Qiubai
Wen Ruohan	Zhang Tailei
Liu Tao	Consort Jin
Jing Boran	Xie Zhaomin
Fang Anna	
Hong Jiantao	Huang Xing
Bao Bei'er	Peking University student
Sergey Barkovski	Vladimir Lenin
Yan Ruihan	Puyi
Zhang Jiaze	Li Dazhao
Li Chen	Zhang Guotao
Chang Chen	Chiang Kai-shek
Zhou Xun	Wang Huiwu
Andy Lau	Cai E
Zhang Hanyu	Song Jiaoren
He Ping	He Shuheng
Tan Kai	Chen Tanqiu
Huang Xuan	Liu Renjing
Michelle Ye	Li Lizhuang
Wang Luodan	Zhang Ruoming
Che Yongli	Lu Xiaoman
Liu Yunlong	Jiang Baili
Liu Wenzhi	Xu Shichang
Fan Wei	Li Yuanhong
Alex Fong Chung-sun	Yang Du
Daniel Wu	Hu Shih
Zu Feng	Deng Zhongxia
Lin Shen	Duan Xipeng
Shu Yaoxuan	Wu Bingxiang
Guo Jinglin	Zhang Zongxiang
Feng Danying	Zhang Cuixi
Chen Daoming	V.K. Wellington Koo
Ren Zhengbin	Wei Chenzu
Xie Mengwei	Driver
Fan Lei	Bodyguard leader
Wang Shuoxin	Li Fuchun
Li Xuejian	Yang Changji
Deng Chao	Chen Yi
Wen Zhang	Deng Xiaoping
Xiaoshenyang	
Chen Guoxing	
Dong Jie	Soong Ching-ling
Zou Junbo	Zhu Qisheng
Vitalii Vladasovich Grachyov	Grigori Voitinsky
Eric Tsang	Ta Kung Pao reporter
Myolie Wu	Yuan Shikai's concubine
Gera Shchenko Andriyan	Henk Sneevliet
Du Zhiguo	Policeman
Feng Yuanzheng	Chen Duxiu
Pan Yueming	Cai Hesen
Dong Xuan	Xiang Jingyu
Tang Wei	Tao Yi
Angela Yeung Wing	Xiaofengxian
Ma Shaohua	Sun Yat-sen
Zhou Jie	Li Hanjun
Wang Danrong	Dong Biwu
Zhang Yi	Zhou Fohai
Wang Xueqi	Cai Yuanpei
Wang Po-chieh	Xiao Zisheng
John Woo	Lin Sen
Qin Lan	Su Xuelin
Ray Lui	Wu Peifu
Zhao Benshan	Duan Qirui
Feng Gong	Feng Guozhang
Zhao Chenhao	Feng Guozhang's deputy
Nick Cheung	Liang Qichao
Ren Zhong	Yuan Jiasheng
Zhang Jian	Lin Chenru
Xia Fan	Zhang Shenfu
Jiang Shan	Chen Yan'an
Zhang Shan	Zhang Boling
Lin Yongjian	Lu Zhengxiang
Tian Xiaojie	Alfred Sao-ke Sze
Zhao Chenguang	Reporter
Xu Zheng	Duan Qirui's deputy
Han Geng	Deng Xiaoping
Yu Xiaoguang	Liu Shaoqi
Fan Bingbing	Empress Dowager Longyu
Jiang Wu	Tao Chengzhang
Nie Weiping	
Fu Xinbo	Gao Junyu
Nie Yuan	Chen Qimei
Lin Xiang	Schoolteacher
Miriam Yeung	Hong Kong teenager
Alex Fong Lik-san	Hong Kong teenager
Miura Kenichi	Japanese signatory of the Twenty-One Demands

== Production ==
The Founding of a Party was one of 28 films promoted by the State Administration of Radio, Film, and Television to mark the 90th anniversary of the Communist Party. Filming commenced on 18 August 2010 at the China Film Group Corporation's shooting location in Huairou District, Beijing.

Dubbed by the Western media as a "propaganda epic", the film has a final all-star cast, including celebrities from mainland China, Hong Kong, Taiwan, and other countries, who play the roles of various historical figures; a few notable actors include Andy Lau, Chow Yun-fat, Taiwanese-American singer Leehom Wang, Hong Kong film director John Woo, Taiwanese actor Chang Chen, Hong Kong actor Eric Tsang, mainland Chinese singer Han Geng and Russian singer Vitalii Vladasovich Grachyov (stage name Vitas). Liu Ye, who played a young Mao Zedong, was reported to have gained 10 kilograms (22 lb) to play his role, a feat achieved by eating 20 eggs a day. Media reports claim that over 400 actors auditioned for the film's roles.

During a news conference on 8 June 2011, the film's director Huang Jianxin said that the film would have several scenes cut, as the original film would have otherwise been too long for theatrical release. Among the cuts were actress Tang Wei's performance as Tao Yi, an early female partner of Mao Zedong. Some media reports claimed that Mao Zedong's grandson Mao Xinyu, a major-general in the People's Liberation Army, objected to her being inappropriate for the role (citing her earlier role in the erotic-thriller film Lust, Caution). A cinema group executive, however, alleged that unnamed "industry insiders" had questioned the factual accuracy of her character and denied the decision was related to Tang's role in Lust, Caution.

Production values have improved over Han Sanping's previous film The Founding of a Republic, with better-lit widescreen photography created by Zhao Xiaoshi. As with Republic, Party also features musical scores by Shu Nan. Some original black-and-white documentary footage included within the film. The film was also given an opportunity to shoot within the Moscow Kremlin.

== Sponsorship ==
Shanghai GM, the Chinese joint venture of the American automotive giant General Motors, announced in September 2010 that its subsidiary Cadillac had become 'chief business partner' to the film. General Motors was hit by criticism upon revelations that it had sponsored the Chinese communist propaganda film. General Motors said the sponsorship was a commercial alliance initiated by its Chinese joint venture and described it as "part of a strategic alignment with the film industry". The film group spokesman said Cadillac had signed a multi-year cooperation deal with the studio, not solely for the film.

== Release ==
The premiere event of the film took place on 8 June in Beijing, prior to its official release on 15 June. According to Han Sanping, the film was shown abroad in over 10 countries, including the United States, Canada, Australia, South Korea and Singapore, and that the global version of the film finished editing on 8 June. The theme song of the film is titled One Day. The IMAX version of the film was screened in only a select 20 of the 24 IMAX theatres in China.

The Chinese theatrical releases of Transformers: Dark of the Moon and Harry Potter and the Deathly Hallows – Part 2 were delayed until late July, possibly to ensure that The Founding of a Party received the maximum amount of attention possible.

The international (overseas) release featured the alternate title Beginning of the Great Revival and a different cut compared to the domestic China version, and was released in North America, Australia and New Zealand on 24 June 2011.

== Reception ==
Two days after the box office release, the film's gross exceeded RMB 50 million, and there were reports that the majority of viewers were young people. However, The Christian Science Monitor reported that ticket sales were inflated by mass distribution of free tickets; staff were given time off from work to see the film. Schools and government offices had to buy large numbers of tickets. Box office takings have been inflated at the expense of popular films – many complicit cinemas manually altered computerised ticket stubs for the film, allowing the viewer to see other films. The Chinese media was not allowed to criticise the film.

A review by Derek Elley suggests that Han Sanping's idea of "selling" official anniversary films by cramming them full of celebrity cameos was not as successful in The Founding of a Party in comparison to his previous 2009 film The Founding of a Republic created to celebrate the 60th anniversary of the People's Republic of China, although the tactic still works to a lesser extent; he suggests that the use of star cameos was inherently less panoramic because the film plot is set within a smaller scope of a 10-year period, and that the concept of star cameos is "a tad less fresh". As with Republic, Party provides a strong "ooh-look! factor" due to its familiar faces; however, very few actors get a chance to build real performances in dramatic terms. He also praises the scene designs, referring to a sequence in Beijing as having a "fairytale atmosphere". Elley rates the film overall at 7 out of 10.

== See also ==
- The Founding of a Republic
