= Man Jiang Hong =

Set of Chinese lyrical poems

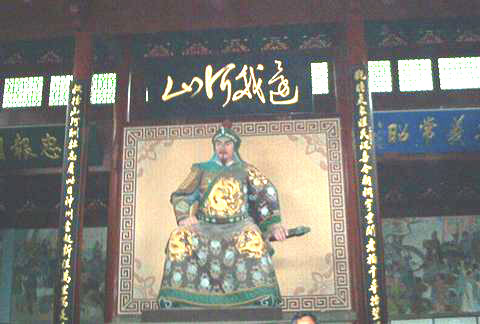
Statue of Yue Fei at the Yue Fei Mausoleum in Hangzhou. The four characters on the banner above his head reads, "return my rivers and mountains", one of the themes espoused in his poem.

Man Jiang Hong (Chinese: 滿江紅; pinyin: Mǎn Jīang Hóng; lit. 'whole river red') is the title of a set of Chinese lyrical poems (ci) sharing the same pattern. If unspecified, it most often refers to the one attributed to the Song dynasty general Yue Fei.

== Poem and meaning ==
Chinese

怒髮衝冠，憑欄處，瀟瀟雨歇。
抬望眼，仰天長嘯，壯懷激烈。
三十功名塵與土，八千里路雲和月。
莫等閒白了少年頭，空悲切。
靖康恥，猶未雪；
臣子恨，何時滅？
駕長車踏破賀蘭山缺！
壯志飢餐胡虜肉，笑談渴飲匈奴血。
待從頭收拾舊山河，朝天闕。

Hanyu Pinyin

nù fà chōng guān, píng lán chù, xiāo xiāo yǔ xiē.
tái wàng yǎn, yǎng tiān cháng xiào, zhuàng huái jī liè.
sān shí gōng míng chén yǔ tǔ, bā qiān lǐ lù yún hé yuè.
mò děng xián bái liǎo shào nián tóu, kōng bēi qiè.
Jìng kāng chǐ, yóu wèi xuě;
chén zǐ hèn, hé shí miè?
jià cháng chē tà pò Hè lán shān quē!
zhuàng zhì jī cān hú lǔ ròu, xiào tán hē yǐn xiōng nú xuè.
dài cóng tóu shōu shí jiù shān hé, cháo tiān què.

English translation

My wrath bristles through my helmet, the rain stops as I stand by the rail;
I look up towards the sky and let loose a passionate roar.
At the age of thirty, my deeds are nothing but dust, my journey has taken me over eight thousand li (Note: A li (ancient Chinese measurement of distance) is about half a kilometre or 1/3 of a mile.)
So do not sit by idly, for young men will grow old in regret.
The Humiliation of Jingkang (Note: This refers to the Jingkang Incident of 1127, in which forces of the Jurchen-led Jin dynasty conquered the Northern Song dynasty's capital, Kaifeng, and captured the Song emperors Huizong and Qinzong.) still lingers,
When will the pain of the Emperor's subjects ever end?
Let us ride our chariots through the Helan Pass,
There we shall feast on barbarian flesh and drink the blood of the Xiongnu.
Let us begin anew to recover our old empire, (Note: In 1141, the Song dynasty signed the humiliating Treaty of Shaoxing which renounced its claims to all lands north of the Huai River. In other words, the people of Song felt humiliated when they were forced to become a tributary of the Jurchens.) before paying tribute to the Emperor.

== Authorship controversy ==
The common belief is that Yue Fei wrote the poem in 1133 at the age of 30 during the Jin–Song Wars. In 1127, the Song emperors Qinzong and Huizong were captured by forces of the Jurchen-led Jin dynasty (this incident is known as the "Humiliation of Jingkang", as mentioned in the poem). Emperor Gaozong retreated to present-day Hangzhou in 1127 and established the Southern Song dynasty.

However, James T. C. Liu, a history professor from Princeton University, states that Yue Fei's version was actually written by a different person in the early 16th century. The poem was not included in the collected works of Yue Fei compiled by Yue's grandson, Yue Ke (岳柯; 1183–post 1234), and neither was it mentioned in any major works written before the Ming dynasty. The section that states the author's wish "to stamp down Helan Pass" is what led scholars to this conclusion. Helan Pass was in Western Xia, which was not one of Yue Fei's military targets. Liu suggests the "real author of the poem was probably Zhao Kuan who engraved it on a tablet at Yue Fei's tomb in 1502, in order to express the patriotic sentiments which were running high at that time, about four years after General Wang Yue scored a victory over the Oirats near the Helan Pass in Inner Mongolia."

== Music ==
The poem has been set to music various times, including a Mandarin song from the 1930s performed by operatic baritone Yi-Kwei Sze in the 1950s. Other singers such as Shi Hong'e, Yang Hongji and Zhang Mingmin have also performed this rendition.

Hong Kong singer Roman Tam sang a Cantonese song "Moon Kong Hung" ("Man Jiang Hong" in Mandarin), composed by Joseph Koo, for the 1983 television series The Legend of the Condor Heroes.

Another Cantonese song of the same title was composed by Kwan Shing-yau and performed by Deric Wan for the 1984 Hong Kong television series By Royal Decree.

== See also ==
- Media about Yue Fei
- History of the Song dynasty
- Jin–Song Wars
- Yue Fei Temple
- Tomb of Yue Fei
- Full River Red, film by Zhang Yimou based on the poem
