= Zhang Ruoming =

Chinese scholar of French literature

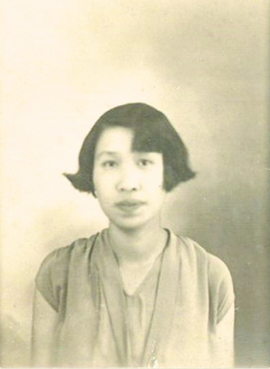
Zhang Ruoming, circa 1919

Zhang Ruoming (Chinese: 张若名; pinyin: Zhāng Ruò Míng; 1902–1958) was a Chinese scholar of French literature, translator and journalist. She was a professor at Yunnan University and considered an authority on the French author André Gide. She was one of the first Chinese women to earn a doctorate in France, graduating from the University of Lyon. In her youth, she was a leader in the May Fourth Movement in Tianjin and was known for her political association with Zhou Enlai and the Chinese Communist Party in France in the early 1920s.

== Early life and activism ==
Zhang Ruoming was born on 16 January 1902 (Note: Some accounts give her date of birth as 23 February 1902.) in Wenren Village, south of Baoding in Hebei province. Her father held a prominent position in the military. He married a second wife during her childhood, an action that humiliated her mother. Her uncle, who had studied medicine in Japan, helped her to attend school. She attended the Tianjin Zhili First Normal Girls School in Tianjin beginning in 1916. She enrolled in the normal school at the same time as Deng Yingchao. In Tianjin, she was involved with the New Culture Movement, particularly feminist issues.

In 1919, Zhang was involved in the May Fourth Movement. She was a founder and leader of the Tianjin Women's Patriotic Association, alongside Liu Qingyang and Guo Longzhen. With Deng Yingchao, they "formed the backbone" of the Awakened Society. While protesting the imprisonment of fellow activists in January, Zhang and several others were arrested. They were held for six months before being released in July of that year. In 1920 Zhang was a correspondent, writing political analyses for the Beijing periodical Morning News. Her article on the women's movement, "Women Pioneers", was published in the student journal The Awakening in early 1920. She argued that women were denied economic power in order to control them. Zhang joined several other students, including Zhou Enlai, who went to study in France in November 1920 as part of the Diligent Work-Frugal Study Movement.

== Studies in France and Communism ==
Zhang attended the University of Lyon, earning her baccalauréat par équivalence in 1924. She joined the Chinese Communist Party in France in the early 1920s but resigned from the party in 1924.

In February 1928 she earned a master's degree in humanities from the University of Lyon. She then studied French literature and wrote her doctoral thesis on the French author André Gide. She defended her thesis, "The Attitude of André Gide" (L'Attitude d'André Gide), on 15 December 1930 and became one of the first Chinese women to earn a doctorate in France. She sent a copy of her thesis to Gide who wrote back, praising her understanding of his development and his work's meaning.

== Return to China ==
Zhang married the ethnologist Yang Kun on 31 May 1930, and the pair returned to China in 1931. She was a university professor in Beijing before moving on to Yunnan University. She was a prominent scholar and considered an authority on Gide. She translated Chinese literature to French. She and her husband were friends with Zhang Shenfu.

== Later life and death ==
In the 1950s, Zhang participated in the Chinese Democratic Alliance. During the Anti-Rightist Campaign, she was labelled a rightist and condemned in 1957. She died by suicide in 1958.

Zhang's son wrote an essay about her life for the 70th anniversary of the May Fourth Movement in 1989. Zhang has been depicted in historical television dramas and films, including Nos Annees Francaises (2012) and The Founding of a Party (2011).
