= Han Sanping =

Chinese film producer and distributor (born 1953)

- Born: 1 October 1953 (age 72); Wangcang County, Guangyuan, Sichuan, China
- Occupations: Film producer, distributor, behind-the-scenes cross-border producer

Chinese name
- Traditional Chinese: 韓三平
- Simplified Chinese: 韩三平
Transcriptions
Standard Mandarin
- Hanyu Pinyin: Hán Sānpíng
Yue: Cantonese
- Jyutping: Hon4 Saam1-ping4

Han Sanping (born 1 October 1953) is a Chinese film producer and distributor. Until 2014, he served as the chairman of the state-owned China Film Group Corporation, which is one of the largest distributors and exporters of Chinese films. Caixin reported that Han retired from his state position shortly after being questioned during the anti-graft investigation into Zhou Yongkang, a high-level official in the Chinese Communist Party. Han has also co-produced with established film directors such as Peter Chan, Chen Kaige, Stephen Chow and Johnnie To. Han is currently a co-head of Zhengfu Pictures. He is assigned to serve as Jury Head of Asian World Film Festival.

Apart from being the former chairman of China Film Group Corporation, Han also serves as the President of Beijing Film Studio and the Chinese Children Film Studio, as well as Vice Managing Director of the Chinese Film Producer Association.

In 2009 and 2011, he directed two patriotic tribute films: The Founding of a Republic for the 60th anniversary of the People's Republic of China, and The Founding of a Party for the 90th anniversary of the Chinese Communist Party. Both films featured cameos by famous actors and other film industry figures. He also produced the 2020 web series The Bad Kids. He acted as a behind-the-scenes cross-border producer for Midway (2019) and Greyhound (2020).
