= The Patriot Yue Fei =

- Promotional poster
- Also known as: The Last Hero
- 精忠岳飞
- Genre: Historical drama
- Based on: General Yue Fei by Qian Cai
- Screenplay by: Ting Shan-hsi; Stanley Tong
- Directed by: Kuk Kwok-leung; Zou Jicheng
- Starring: Huang Xiaoming; Ruby Lin; Gallen Lo; Allen Ting; Cheng Pei-pei; Steve Yoo; Shao Bing; Wu Xiubo; Cecilia Liu; Viann Zhang; Yu Rongguang
- Theme music composer: Wakin Chau
- Composer: Nathan Wang
- Country of origin: China
- Original language: Mandarin
- No. of episodes: 69

Production
- Producer: Stanley Tong
- Production location: China
- Running time: ≈45 minutes per episode
- Production companies: China Film Group Corporation; Huang Xiaoming Studio
- Budget: US$30 million

Original release
- Network: Anhui TV; Zhejiang TV; Tianjin TV; Shandong TV
- Release: 4 July – 29 July 2013

The Patriot Yue Fei (精忠岳飞) is a 2013 Chinese historical television series based on the life of Yue Fei, a Song dynasty general widely regarded as a patriotic hero in Chinese culture for his role in the wars between the Song and Jin dynasties. While the plot is based on historical sources and Yue Fei's real-life descendants served as consultants, it also includes fictional elements and draws ideas from the novel General Yue Fei and other folktales on the general's life.

Huang Xiaoming starred as the titular character in the series, which started shooting in 2011. The budget of the series exceeded ¥200 million (roughly US$30 million). The first episode premiered on 4 July 2013.

== Cast ==
=== Yue Fei and family ===
- Huang Xiaoming as Yue Fei, a Song general known for resisting invaders from the Jin dynasty for decades and patriotism; he was tragically executed for trumped-up charges by the very regime he served, resulted of him being a deified martyr in Chinese history.
- Cheng Pei-pei as Lady Yao, Yue Fei's mother.
- Gao Yuqing as Yao Gun, Yue Fei's maternal uncle.
- Yang Zheng as Yue Xiang, Yue Fei's younger brother.
- Ruby Lin as Li Wa (Li Xiao'e), Yue Fei's wife.
- Zhou Bin as Yue Yun, Yue Fei's eldest son and subordinate.
  - Zheng Wei as Yue Yun (teenager)
  - Hong Weijia as Yue Yun (child)
- Zhang Zhixi as Yue Anniang, Yue Fei's daughter.
  - Du Hanmeng as Yue Anniang (teenager)
  - Zhang Zimu as Yue Anniang (child)
- Wan Changhao as Yue Ting, Yue Fei's third son.
  - Yang Sichen as Yue Ting (teenager)
- Zhao Yuanyuan as Juan'er, Wu Susu's maid, later as Yue Yun's wife (historical archetype was Lady Gong).
  - Wang Kexin as Juan'er (child)

=== Yue Fei's associates and colleagues ===
- Wu Xiubo as Gao Chong, Yue Fei's subordinate and a descendant of Gao Huaide.
- Cecilia Liu as Lady Yang, Gao Chong's wife.
- Roy Wong as Zhang Yong, Yue Fei's subordinate.
- Kang Kai as Niu Gao, Yue Fei's subordinate.
- Cui Lin as Zhang Xian, Yue Fei's subordinate.
- Zhang Yun as Fu Qing, Yue Fei's subordinate.
- Wang Haixiang as Yang Zaixing, Yue Fei's subordinate.
- Yan Yanlong as Wang Gui, Yue Fei's subordinate.
- Shao Bing as Han Shizhong, a Song general also known for resisting invaders from the Jin dynasty.
- Viann Zhang as Liang Hongyu, Han Shizhong's wife.
- Yu Rongguang as Zhou Tong, Yue Fei's mentor.
- Jenny Zhang as Wu Susu, a youxia and Yue Fei's close friend.

=== Song dynasty figures ===
==== House of Zhao (Song imperial family) ====
- Allen Ting as Zhao Gou (Emperor Gaozong), the tenth ruler of the Song dynasty.
- Shi Yanjing as Zhao Ji (Emperor Huizong), the eighth ruler of the Song dynasty and the father of the emperors Qinzong and Gaozong.
- Cheng Wu as Zhao Huan (Emperor Qinzong), the ninth ruler of the Song dynasty.
- Liu Chenxia as Lady Wei, Emperor Huizong's consort and Emperor Gaozong's mother.
- Jiang Xuanmi as Lady Zheng, Emperor Huizong's wife.
- Yan Luyang as Empress Zhu, Emperor Qinzong's wife.
- Huang Xiaoge as Empress Xing / Empress Wu, Emperor Gaozong's wives.

==== Song imperial court ====
- Gallen Lo as Qin Hui, a treacherous Song minister who played an important role in Yue Fei's death.
- Lu Yong as Zong Ze, a Song general and Yue Fei's superior after Liu Ge and mentor in military tactics.
- Chen Zhihui as Liu Ge, a Song general and Yue Fei's superior and friend.
- Liu Enyou as Prince Liang, a descendant of Chai Rong.
- An Yaping as Wang Xie
- Wang Li as Du Chong
- Yang Liu as Liu Zhengyan
- Wang Teng as Zong Xin
- Li Haohan as Yuwen Xuzhong
- Zeng Hongsheng as Wan Sixie
- Zhang Di as Liang Xing
- Wu Zhensu as Zhang Danian
- Yang Zhe as Zhang Suo
- Hai Zi as Wang Yan
- Bi Zhenlin as Wang Yuan
- Liu Kui as Li Gang
- He Qiang as Wang Boyan
- Cheng Liuyi as Zhang Bangchang
- Yang Yi as Tong Guan
- Bai Zhicheng as Yuan He
- Chen Dacheng as Kang Lü
- Zhou Zhonghe as Eunuch Yao
- Lu Ying as Han Xiaozhou
- Tian Jingliang as Zhao Ding
- Zhang Guoqing as Cai Jing
- Zhao Yiyang as Qin Xi
- Yang Sheng as Zhang Jun, a corrupt general and a member of Qin Hui's party who contributes Yue Fei's execution.
- Li Da as Miao Fu
- Zeng Hongsheng as Moqi Xie, a corrupt investigating censor and a member of Qin Hui's party who contributes Yue Fei's execution.

=== Jin dynasty figures ===
- Steve Yoo as Wanyan Zongbi (Jin Wuzhu), the fourth prince of Jin and Yue Fei's primary nemesis in the battlefield.
- An Zehao as Hamichi, Jin Wuzhu's subordinate.
- Jiang Zhengyang as Consort Ling, Jin Wuzhu's consort.
- Wang Wei as Wanyan Zongwang (Wolibu), the second prince of Jin.
- Wu Zhuohan as Wanyan Zonghan (Nianhan), a nephew of Emperor Taizong
- Li Zhenqi as Wanyan Sheng (Emperor Taizong), the second ruler of the Jin dynasty.
- Song Wenbin as Wuleng Simou
- Zhao Jiaqi as Wanyan Dan (Emperor Xizong), the third ruler of the Jin dynasty.
- Gangzhao Riga as Xia Jinwu

=== Others ===
- Angel Wang as Zhao Xiaoman, Zhao Ding's daughter and Qin Hui's concubine; she plots to assassinate Qin Hui.
- Liu Lanfang as storyteller
- Wang Zixuan as Wushima, a woman from Western Xia; she later becomes Zhang Yong's wife.
- Hou Yousheng as Duyanlong
- Ying Er as Jiangnan beauty
- Dong Yue as Guiniang
- Zhong Yunpeng as Liu Banxian
- Zhu Anzhou as Dajiaoya
- Qiu Shiyou as Han Chang
- Liu Fucai as Meng Bangjie
- Zhao Qiusheng as Zhang Chao
- Sang Weilin as Cao Cheng
- Li Yonglin as Ji Qian, a bandit chief.
- Sun Jiaolong as Ji Yong, a bandit chief.
- Ren Daiqian as Lady Wang, Qin Hui's wife and a member of her husband's political party
- Liu Shengwen as Liang Zaiping, Liang Hongyu's brother.
- Yuyang Fangxin as Xiaohui, Li Xiao'e's servant.
- Fei Fei as Qingwan
- Chen Gang as Zhao Yun
- Wang Cheng as Gao Hu
- Lü Shilei as Gao Bao
- Ling Yilei as Gao Long
- Wang Qirui as guard
- Yuan Shuai as guard
- Ding Lan as servant

== Soundtrack ==
- Opening theme: The Rain Hasn't Stop (瀟瀟雨未歇) by Wakin Chau and Tarcy Su
- Ending theme: The Legend of Yue Fei (精忠傳奇) by Tan Jing and Huang Xiaoming
- Silver Armour, Green-clothed Blouse (銀甲青衣) by Han Hong
- Aligned with the Emperor (與君同行) by Yi Hong
- A Leaping Heart (飛躍的心) by Huang Xiaoming
- The Most Beautiful Time (最美的時光) by Bibi Zhou
- Patriotic Heart (仰天长啸) by Nathan Wang

== Ratings ==
CSM46 Satellite TV ratings
Air date	Anhui Satellite TV		Tianjin Satellite TV		Shandong Satellite TV		Zhejiang Satellite TV	
Air date	Ratings (%)	Rank	Ratings (%)	Rank	Ratings (%)	Rank	Ratings (%)	Rank
2013.07.04	0.652	4	0.796	2	0.634	5	0.483	10
2013.07.05	0.639	4	0.675	3	0.505	6	0.461	9
2013.07.06	0.672	3	0.551	6	0.644	4	0.446	10
2013.07.07	0.704	4	0.779	3	0.638	6	0.626	8
2013.07.08	0.637	5	0.706	3	0.636	6	0.669	4
2013.07.09	0.716	5	0.772	4	0.668	6	0.614	10
2013.07.10	0.607	7	0.747	4	0.628	6	0.710	5
2013.07.11	0.596	6	0.682	4	0.704	3	0.645	5
2013.07.12	0.651	4	0.608	6	0.708	3	0.615	5
2013.07.13	0.684	3	0.623	5	0.638	4	0.547	8
2013.07.14	0.631	6	0.669	5	0.698	3	0.688	4
2013.07.15	0.677	7	0.695	5	0.73	4	0.687	6
2013.07.16	0.702	4	0.69	5	0.50	10	0.672	8
2013.07.17	0.705	5	0.624	7	0.611	9	0.725	4
2013.07.18	0.770	4	0.754	5	0.607	6	0.876	3
2013.07.19	0.600	5	0.633	4	0.488	8	0.939	2
2013.07.20	0.637	5	0.640	4	0.501	8	0.692	3
2013.07.21	0.558	5	0.670	4	0.522	9	0.835	3
2013.07.22	0.638	5	0.668	4	0.596	7	0.686	3
2013.07.23	0.565	6	0.593	5	0.601	4	0.815	3
2013.07.24	0.608	4	0.508	8	0.560	5	0.782	3
2013.07.25	0.551	7	0.612	6	0.676	4	0.855	3
2013.07.26	0.590	6	0.514	9	0.527	8	0.912	4
2013.07.27	0.535	7	0.593	5	0.567	6	0.698	4
2013.07.28	0.540	6	0.567	5	0.583	4	0.806	3
2013.07.29	0.762	4	0.612	8	0.638	7	0.730	5

== Awards and nominations ==
2013 China TV Drama Awards

- "Top 10 Dramas of the Year" (8th place)
- Nominated - Li Wa (portrayed by Ruby Lin), Viewers' Favorite Female Character
- Nominated - Liu Shishi, Most Popular Actress (Mainland China)
- Nominated - The Most Beautiful Time (performed by Bibi Zhou), Viewers' Favorite TV theme song

2014 13th Huading Awards

- Nominated - Huang Xiaoming, Best Actor in a Chinese TV Series
- Nominated - Ruby Lin, Best Actress in a Chinese TV series
- Won - Gallen Lo, Best Supporting Actor in a Chinese TV series

2014 27th China TV Golden Eagle Award

- Won - Outstanding Television Series

2014 Hengdian Film & Festival of China

- Won - Best Television Series
- Won - Best Director

== See also ==
- Media about Yue Fei
- Eight Thousand Li of Cloud and Moon (TV series), 1988
