= Anachronism (game) =

Tabletop game

- Cardback to Anachronism CCG
- Designers: Michael A. Brown
- Publishers: TriKing Games
- Players: 2-4*
- Setup time: 3 minutes
- Playing time: 5–10 minutes
- Chance: High
- Age range: 12 and up
- Skills: Strategy, Dice rolling, Card playing, Collecting

Anachronism is a tabletop game with aspects of both miniatures and collectible card genres. The basis of the game is war between various historical characters. The creators of the game, TriKing Games and The History Channel, have dubbed it "The Greatest Game in History". Anachronism won the 2005 Origins Award for Gamer’s Choice Best Collectible Card Game of the Year. The game depicts artistic work by Rob Alexander, Douglas Chaffee, Ed Cox, Kaja Foglio, Randy Richard Gallegos, Ralph Horsley, April Lee, and Alan Pollack.

== Description ==
The game is a contest of arms between two warriors from numerous historical periods. Each game lasts a maximum of five rounds. The game is unusual for a card game in that it does not use shuffling as a randomization technique. Anachronism "decks" consist of five cards, and players do not draw cards or have a "hand" of cards. Despite the relatively small number of cards used in each game, card interactions and strategy can become surprisingly intricate, especially in the later rounds. Each player places his chosen warrior card on the playmat and his four support cards, face down, in slots corresponding to the first four rounds. The support cards may be any combination of inspiration, weapon, armor, or special cards. Each player flips his leftmost face-down support card at the beginning of each round. Initiative numbers on the support cards determine which player goes first in each round. The warrior cards may move and be turned (faced) as in a miniatures game. Support cards represent a variety of historical weapons, armor, items, deities, people, places or concepts such as the Norse sverd or Japanese book Go Rin No Sho. The game's name is derived from the ability to mix the various support cards such that the ancient Greek Leonidas wearing a kimono may fight a Japanese ninja who is wielding a gladius. Dice are used by both the attacker and defender to determine the outcome of battles.

Each warrior card has four stats: life, speed, experience, and damage:

- Life indicates the warrior's starting life total. Current cards have values ranging from 5 to 10.
- Speed shows how many actions the warrior can take each round. This is usually 3, but a few warriors have slightly more or less than this.
- Experience has subtle but far-reaching effects as an all purpose tie-breaking stat. It is the most variable of the statistics with current extremes ranging from 1 to 10.
- Damage shows how much damage the warrior deals with a basic attack. This is almost always 1. However, Aztec warriors usually have a base damage value of 0 and at least one warrior has a base damage value of 2.

Every warrior and weapon card has an attack grid showing what bonus or penalty is applied to attacks rolls to each possible space. Blank spaces on an attack grid indicate that the warrior or weapon can not attack that square. Attack grids are relative to the orientation of one's warrior, so skillful management of attack grids becomes very important to successful gameplay.

=== Elements ===
Every Inspiration and Warrior has an element reflecting the nature of the card. Elements also identify card interaction. A popular example is Maui-Tiki-Tiki, a water warrior, who gains +1 to all attack rolls against fire warriors.

- Fire "melts" Metal
- Metal "cuts" Wood
- Wood "penetrates" Earth
- Earth "absorbs" Water
- Water "puts out" Fire
- Fire cards, like Mercury, represent speed.
- Metal cards, like Horemheb the Restorer or Rokumonsenmon, represent strength.
- Wood cards, like Leonidas, represent longevity.
- Earth cards, like Zeus, represent experience.
- Water cards, like the Oracle of Delphi, represent intelligence.
- Wind cards, like Ninja, represent cunning.
- Aether cards, like Seti I, represent religious cards or spiritual cards.

=== Multi-player ===
Anachronism's standard rules are for two players, but official support and rules have been given for multi-player battles. Multi-player Anachronism is usually played with four players, either in teams or as a free-for-all. The standard four by four battlemat is used and additional starting rows are squeezed into the normally unused border rows. This means that each corner has an overlap of two starting rows, making it possible for two warriors to start adjacent to each other. Free-for-all style multi-player can also be played with only three participants.

This does not limit the number of participants to just four. Many players have created their own large mats, ranging from 5X5 to a giant 8 x12 mat. With this, it is possible to have six to even eight competitors playing.

=== Culture Shock ===
"Culture Shock" is an alternative method of play that restricts players to only use cards within their warrior's culture. For example, the Japanese Warrior, Ninja could never use the French weapon, Rapiere. As a result, players can still choose to play any one card, but the combinations are limited. Hence, Culture Shock is generally perceived as the best method of play to enable newer players or players with fewer cards to be able to compete against more experienced players with a larger selection of cards.

== Sets ==
The initial game was released in three parts. The first part was a free demo consisting of the warriors Miyamoto Musashi, Beowulf, their support cards, and a playmat in the April 2005 issue of InQuest Gamer. The second was a starter set featuring the warriors Spartacus & Achilles, their support cards, dice, and a playmat. The final portion was 16 warrior packs. Set 2 followed soon after, and TriKing attempted to release a new Set every 3–4 months.

=== Published Sets ===
For the published Sets, cards were available in four different avenues. Each Set contained a Starter Box, with ten cards representing two warriors and their respective support cards. Released with the Starter were 16 Warrior Packs, each containing five cards representing a warrior and their support cards. Players could then mail in UPC codes to get the last two "Mail-in" Warrior Packs. Finally, by playing in sanctioned tournaments, players received exclusive promotional cards. Each pack always had the same cards, so there was no rarity or randomness, outside of promotional cards.

This format lasted through Set 7, the final release published by TriKing Games. Due to financial concerns, TriKing went on a "hiatus" in early 2007, from which it has yet to return. The company continued sending tournament kits, but had let go of its design team after they turned in the card text for Set 9. TriKing had little to no presence during the important 2007 summer conventions; soon after, they stopped sending tournament kits, and their forums have been in disrepair since October.

=== Players' Committee ===
Since then, players and designers have attempted to keep the game alive. Anachronism's Lead Developer released the finished card text for the unpublished Set 8, sanctioning it for organized play. He is in the process of doing the same for Set 9. Players in "The Coliseum" (an alternate Anachronism forum) have worked together to create a full set of card images, to be used online or printed at home. These resources can be found at Dystemporalia or the Anachronism Cantina.

A handful of dedicated players, along with a couple of former design team members, have formed the Anachronism Players' Committee (PC). Also based out of "The Coliseum," the PC is working to finalize Set 9 text, continue an organized play system, and develop the first post-TriKing release—Set 10.

=== Releases ===
Set #	Release date	Cultures featured	Notes
Set 1	April 2005	Greek, Japanese, Norse, Roman	Demo pack instead of mail-ins
Set 2	June 2005	Briton, Chinese, Egyptian, Mongol	No promotional cards with this set
Set 3	September 2005	French, Germanic, Native American, Scottish	-
Set 4	November 2005	Irish, Māori, Persian, Russian	-
Set 5	February 2006	Aztec, Japanese, Saracen, Spanish	First Set to Have a Previous Culture revisited
Set 6	August 2006	Chinese, Pirate, Romanian, Turkish	-
Set 7	November 2006	American Frontiersmen, Greek, Tribes of Israel, Trojan	Last published release
Set 8	October 2007	African Kingdoms, Briton, Carthaginian, Roman	Released as card text
Set 9	February 2008	Italian, Korean, Norse, Pirate	Released as card text
Set 10	TBD 2008	East Indian, Egyptian, Holy Roman, Tribes of Israel	Player-created, in development

== Competitive play ==
Anachronism features a series of tournaments with high-profile prizes, such as a trip to one of various destinations in Europe. At the local level, Tournament Organizers and Mercenaries schedule and run tournaments of various sizes. The prizes for these events are often exclusive promotional cards. Each month, a new set of three promotional cards are sent to stores hosting sanctioned tournaments. Near the end of Anachronism's published run, TriKing began charging for these tournament kits. Since the advent of Set 8, all tournament kits are available online at Dystemporalia or the Anachronism Cantina.

There used to be a series of larger tournaments held over the late spring and summer months. Starting in 2006, TriKing began sanctioning Regional Qualifier tournaments. Open qualifier tournaments for U.S. Nationals and the World Championship were held at Origins, in Columbus, Ohio. U.S. Nationals took place the next month in Indianapolis, Indiana, at Gen Con, which also had another open qualifier for Worlds.

The annual World Championship was held at Dragon Con in Atlanta, Georgia. In September 2005, Mathieu Brochu won a new MINI Cooper as the grand prize of the first Anachronism World Championship. One year later, in September 2006, Garritt Pruim won a Toshiba laptop computer as the grand prize of the second Anachronism World Championship. In 2007, the World Championship was cancelled by TriKing, the day before the U.S. Nationals at GenCon.

Recently, the Players' Committee has attempted to revive Competitive Play, using online resources such at Apprentice, LackeyCCG, and over AIM with an Online Playmat. The first tournament organized by the PC is offering the winner the choice of Set 10's final culture sweep.

Today the Anachronism plugin for Lackey is available and up to be played with the LackeyCCG.

== Reviews ==
- Pyramid
