= Chen Yannian =

Chinese communist (1898–1927)

- 陈延年
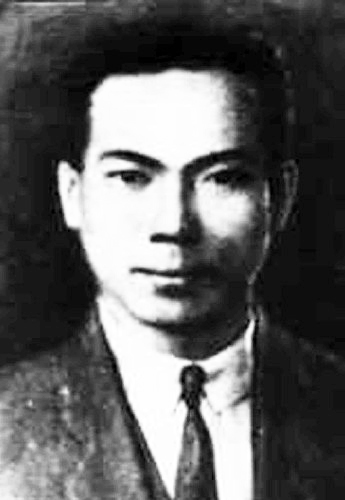

Alternate member of the Political Bureau of the 5th Central Committee of the Chinese Communist Party
- In office 9 May 1927 – 4 July 1927
- General Secretary: Chen Duxiu

Personal details
- Born: 1898 Anqing Prefecture, Anhui, Qing China
- Died: 1927 (aged 28–29) Shanghai, Republic of China
- Party: Chinese Communist Party
- Relations: Chen Qiaonian; Chen Songnian; Chen Yuying
- Parent: Chen Duxiu
- Education: Aurora University

Chinese name
- Simplified Chinese: 陈延年
- Traditional Chinese: 陳延年
Transcriptions
Standard Mandarin
- Hanyu Pinyin: Chén Yánnián

Chen Xiayan
- Simplified Chinese: 陈遐延
- Traditional Chinese: 陳遐延
Transcriptions
Standard Mandarin
- Hanyu Pinyin: Chén Xiáyán

Chen Yannian (1898 – 4 July 1927) was a Chinese revolutionary and early leader of the Chinese Communist Party (CCP).

== Biography ==
Chen was born in Anqing Prefecture, Anhui, in 1898, to Chen Duxiu, a revolutionary socialist, educator, philosopher and author, who co-founded the Communist Party with Li Dazhao in 1921. His siblings were, in order of birth: Chen Qiaonian, Chen Songnian and Chen Yuying. He attended the Anqing Shangzhi School (安庆尚志小学) and Quanwan Middle School (全皖中学). In 1915, he went to study in Shanghai with his younger brother Chen Qiaonian. Soon after, the two brothers were accepted to Aurora University.

In December 1919, under the influence of the May Fourth Movement, the two brothers went to France to study under a work-study programme. In June 1922, he co-founded the Chinese Youth Communist Party with Zhao Shiyan and Zhou Enlai and served as the propaganda director. In 1922, he joined the French Communist Party. In the winter of 1922, with the approval of the Central Committee of the Chinese Communist Party, the two brother joined the CCP.

In September 1924, Chen returned to Shanghai. In October, he came to Guangzhou as a special commissioner of the CCP Central Committee and served as secretary of Guangdong Provincial Committee of the Communist Youth League of China and director of the Organization Department. In February 1925, he succeeded Zhou Enlai as secretary of the CCP Guangdong Provincial Committee. In June, Chen, Deng Zhongxia, Su Zhaozheng led the Canton–Hong Kong strike.

In April 1927, when Chen went to Wuhan to attend the 5th National Congress of the CCP, the Central Committee appointed him to take over the post of secretary of the CCP Jiangsu and Zhejiang Provincial Committee and was elected an alternate member of the Political Bureau of the 5th Central Committee of the CCP. On his way to Shanghai, the Shanghai massacre broke out. In June 1927, the Central Committee abolished the Jiangsu and Zhejiang Provincial Committee and established Jiangsu Provincial Committee and Zhejiang Provincial Committee respectively. Chen was appointed secretary of the CCP Jiangsu Provincial Committee. On June 26, he was arrested by the Kuomintang police, and later tortured during questioning. On the evening of 4 July 1927, he was pinned down and hacked to death by the Kuomintang police after refusing to kneel for his execution.

In 2009, he was selected as "100 Heroes and Models who made Outstanding Contributions to the Founding of New China" by the Propaganda Department and the Organization Department.

== Later commentary ==
Chen Yannian was the early leader of the CCP whom Chiang Kai-shek, the leader of the Kuomintang, feared the most. Chen Yannian's grand-nephew, Chen Entian, told reporters that during the Great Revolution, Chen Yannian served as the CCP's top leader in South China, he and Zhou Enlai established the CCP's first armed force, pioneering the CCP's practice of the party commanding the gun and laying the foundation for the CCP's army building.

== Monuments ==
There is a road named "Yanqiao Road" (延乔路) after him and his younger brother Chen Qiaonian in Hefei, Anhui.
