= Chen Qiaonian =

Chinese politician (1902–1928)

- 陈乔年
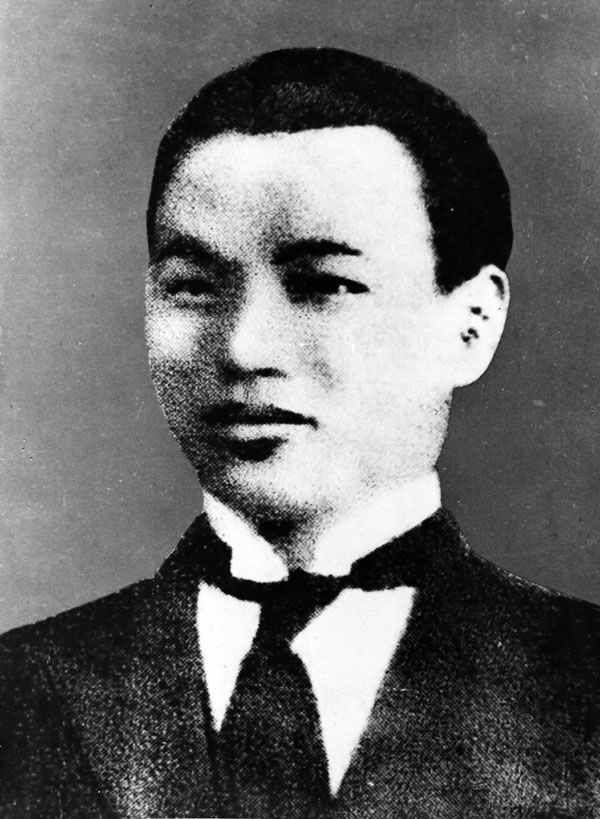

Member of the 5th Central Committee of the Chinese Communist Party
- In office 9 May 1927 – 6 June 1928
- General Secretary: Chen Duxiu

Personal details
- Born: 2 September 1902 Anqing Prefecture, Anhui, Qing China
- Died: 6 June 1928 (aged 25) Shanghai, Republic of China
- Party: Chinese Communist Party
- Spouse: Shi Jingyi
- Relations: Chen Yannian; Chen Songnian; Chen Yuying
- Children: 1
- Parent: Chen Duxiu
- Education: Aurora University

Chinese name
- Simplified Chinese: 陈乔年
- Traditional Chinese: 陳喬年
Transcriptions
Standard Mandarin
- Hanyu Pinyin: Chén Qiáonián

Chen Qiaonian (2 September 1902 – 6 June 1928) was a Chinese revolutionary and early leader of the Chinese Communist Party.

== Biography ==
Chen was born in Anqing Prefecture, Anhui, on 2 September 1902, to Chen Duxiu, a revolutionary socialist, educator, philosopher and author, who co-founded the Communist Party with Li Dazhao in 1921. His siblings were, in order of birth: Chen Yannian, Chen Songnian and Chen Yuying. In 1915, he went to study in Shanghai with his elder brother. Soon after, the two brothers were accepted to Aurora University.

In December 1919, under the influence of the May Fourth Movement, the two brothers went to France to study under a work-study programme. In the winter of 1922, with the approval of the Central Committee of the Chinese Communist Party, the two brother joined the Chinese Communist Party (CCP). In March 1923, Chen and others left France for the Soviet Union to study at the Oriental Communist University in Moscow.

Chen returned to China in the winter of 1924 and was appointed director of the Organization Department of the CCP Beijing Municipal Committee. In February 1925, he set up a printing factory in Beijing to print books and periodicals on communism. In October 1925, the CCP Northern District Committee was established, Li Dazhao served as party chief, and Chen served as director of the Organization Department. After the opening of the Party School of the Northern District Party Committee in October 1925, he taught Marxist, class struggle, party building, world revolutionary situation and the general situation of the international communist movement.

In the second half of 1926, Chen was ordered to leave Beijing to work in the south China. From April 27 to May 11, 1927, the 5th National Congress of the Chinese Communist Party was held in Wuhan, he attended the meeting and was elected a member of the Central Committee. He was made deputy director of the Organization Department of the CCP. At the August 7th Meeting of the CCP, he seriously criticized his father Chen Duxiu's right opportunistic mistakes. Later, he was appointed director of the Organization Department of the CCP Hubei Provincial Committee.

In the winter of 1927, Chen was transferred to Shanghai as director of the Organization Department of the CCP Jiangsu Provincial Committee. On 16 February 1928, the CCP Jiangsu Provincial Committee held a secret meeting at the North Chengdu Road in the British Concession. Chen presided over the meeting. As the traitor Tang Ruilin (唐瑞林) betrayed, the Kuomintang police suddenly encircled the meeting site, and Chen and the leading comrades of the CCP Jiangsu Provincial Committee were arrested. On 6 June 1928, Kuomintang police shot Chen by the Fenglin Bridge in Shanghai. Zheng Futa and Xu Baihao died with him.

== Personal life ==
Chen married Shi Jingyi (史静仪), the couple had a son and a daughter, their son named Chen Hongwu (陈红五), but died young. Their daughter was named Chen Hong (陈鸿).

== Latest research ==
Chen Qiaonian was an early leader who introduced Zhang Xueliang to the Chinese Community Party.This research comes Chen Kongjun,an independent Scholar of the history of the Chinese Community Party and the People’s Liberation Army of China.Chen Kongjun,also known as Chen Entian,is the great-grandson of Chen Duxiu.

== Monuments ==
There is a road named "Yanqiao Road" (延乔路) after him and his elder brother Chen Yannian in Hefei, Anhui.
