= Yue Fei Temple =

Building in Hangzhou, China

Coordinates: 30°14′15″N 120°08′27″E

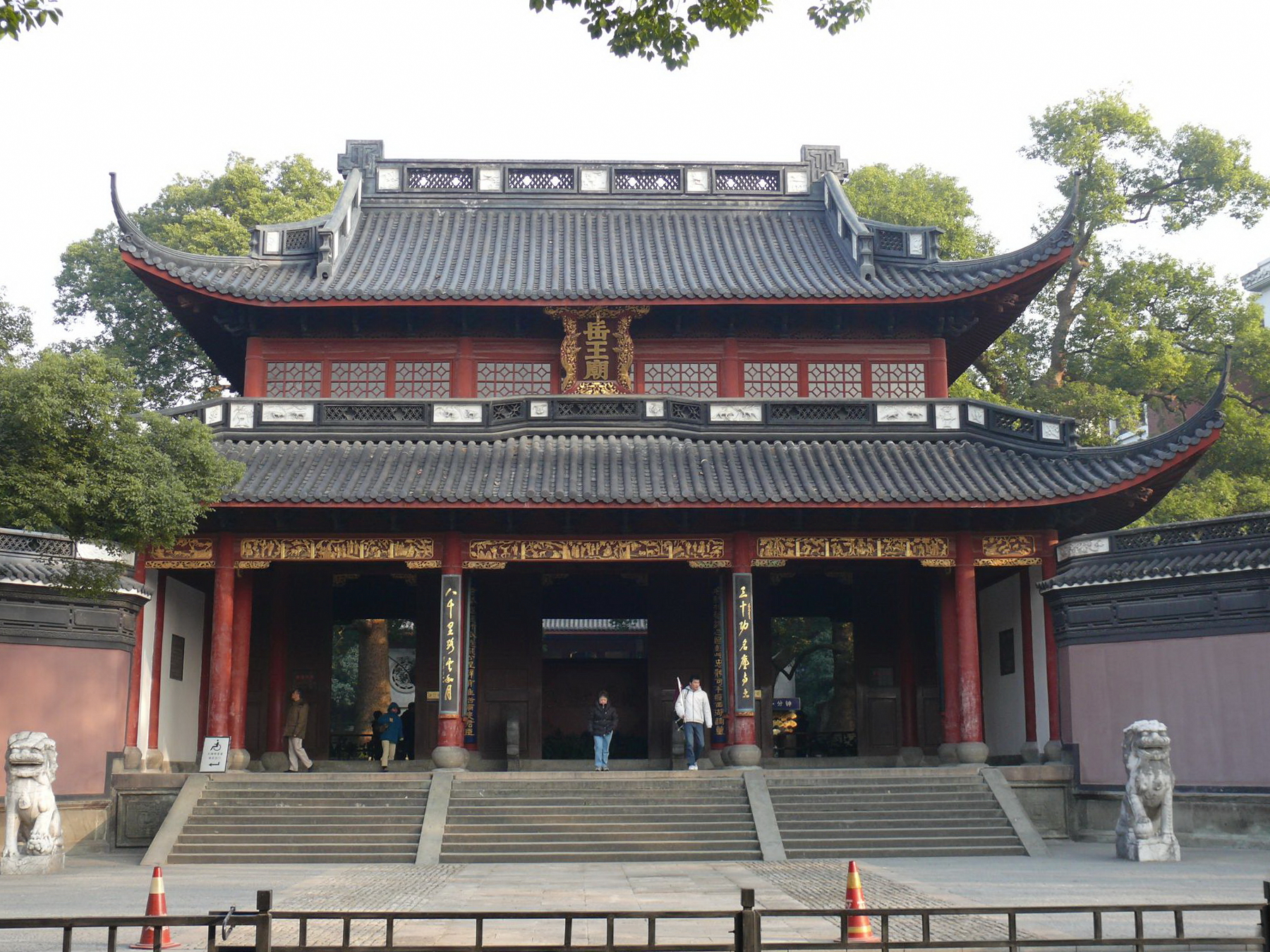
- Entrance
- Traditional Chinese: 岳飛廟
- Simplified Chinese: 岳飞庙
Transcriptions
Standard Mandarin
- Hanyu Pinyin: Yuè Fēi Miào
- Wade–Giles: Yüeh Fei Miao

King Yue Temple
- Traditional Chinese: 岳王廟
- Simplified Chinese: 岳王庙
Transcriptions
Standard Mandarin
- Hanyu Pinyin: Yuèwáng Miào
- Wade–Giles: Yüeh Wang Miao

The Yue Fei Temple, also known as Yuewang or King Yue Temple, is a traditional Chinese temple built around the tomb of the Song-era general Yue Fei in Hangzhou, the capital of Zhejiang Province in eastern China. Yue Fei fought for the Song in their wars against the Jurchen Jin but was executed by the Song in 1142 due to court intrigue and to political pressure during peace negotiations with the Jin. He and his tomb have since become enduring symbols of Chinese patriotism.

The temple complex was first constructed by the Song in 1221 following his rehabilitation and has been restored and expanded several times since then. Yue Fei was never a king in life but received the status posthumously as part of his ceremonial veneration.

The present site includes the Yue Fei Temple proper, a separate Temple of Loyalty, and the tomb of Yue Fei and his son. The sculptures along its spirit way date to the 12th century. The temple and tomb were declared a national monument of the People's Republic of China in 1961 but were nonetheless heavily damaged during the Cultural Revolution in 1966, when Yue Fei fell under criticism as a feudal class enemy. Following Deng Xiaoping's ascension as paramount leader, the site was restored in 1979.

During the early republican period, Hangzhou also had a second Yue Fei temple within its city walls known as the Eastern Yue Temple (東岳廟, Dōng Yuè Miào).

== Gallery ==
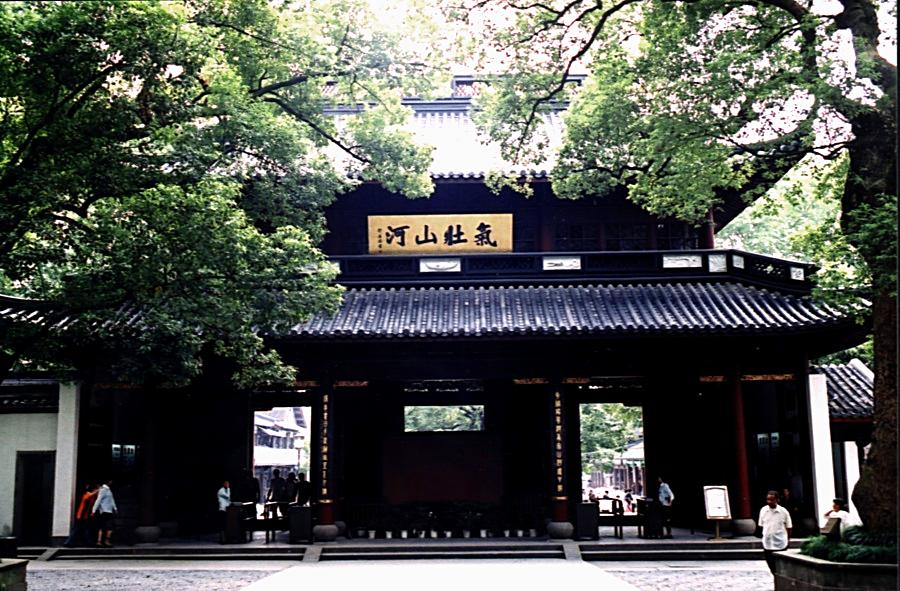
Main entrance

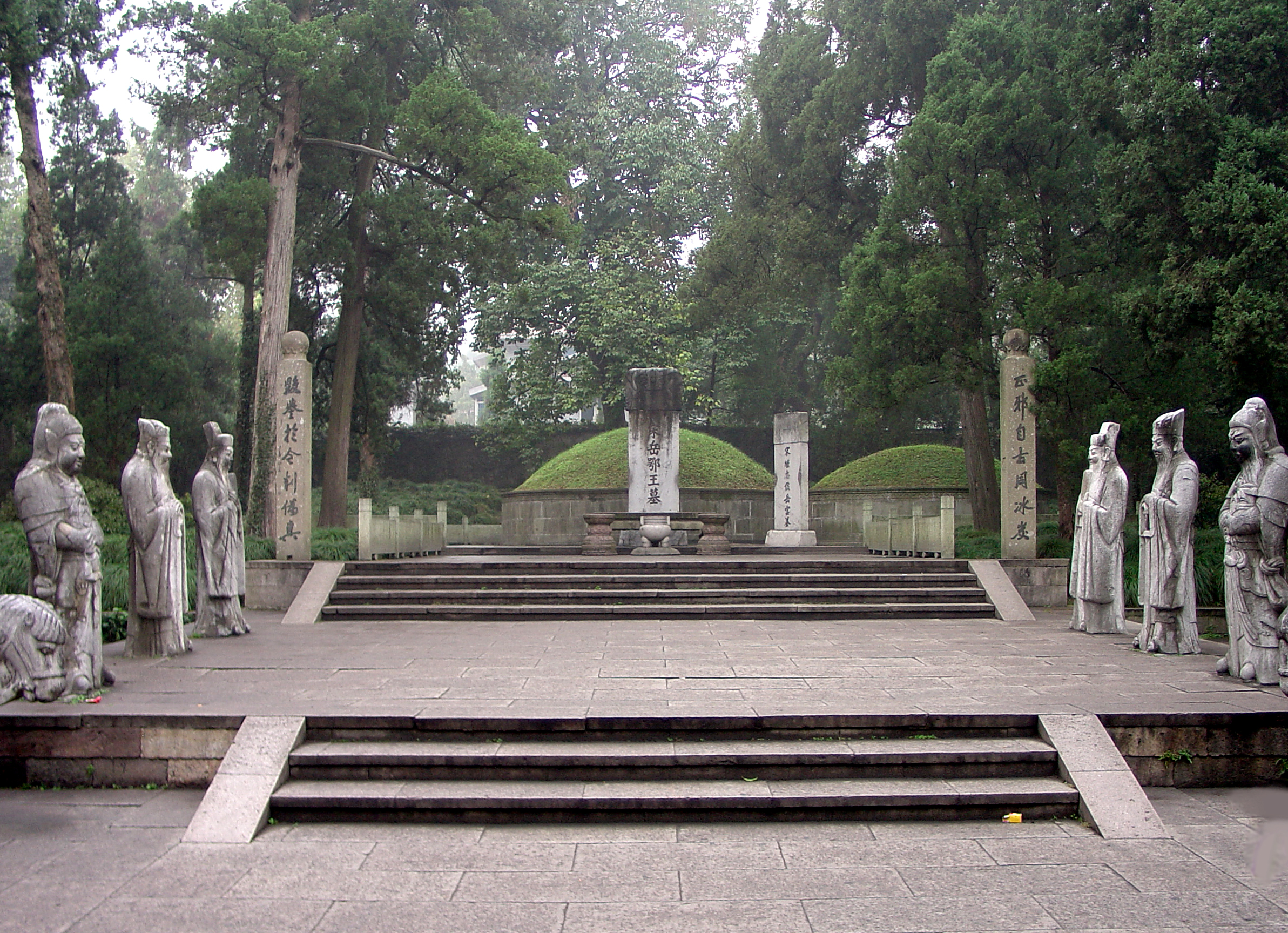
Tomb of Yue Fei and his son

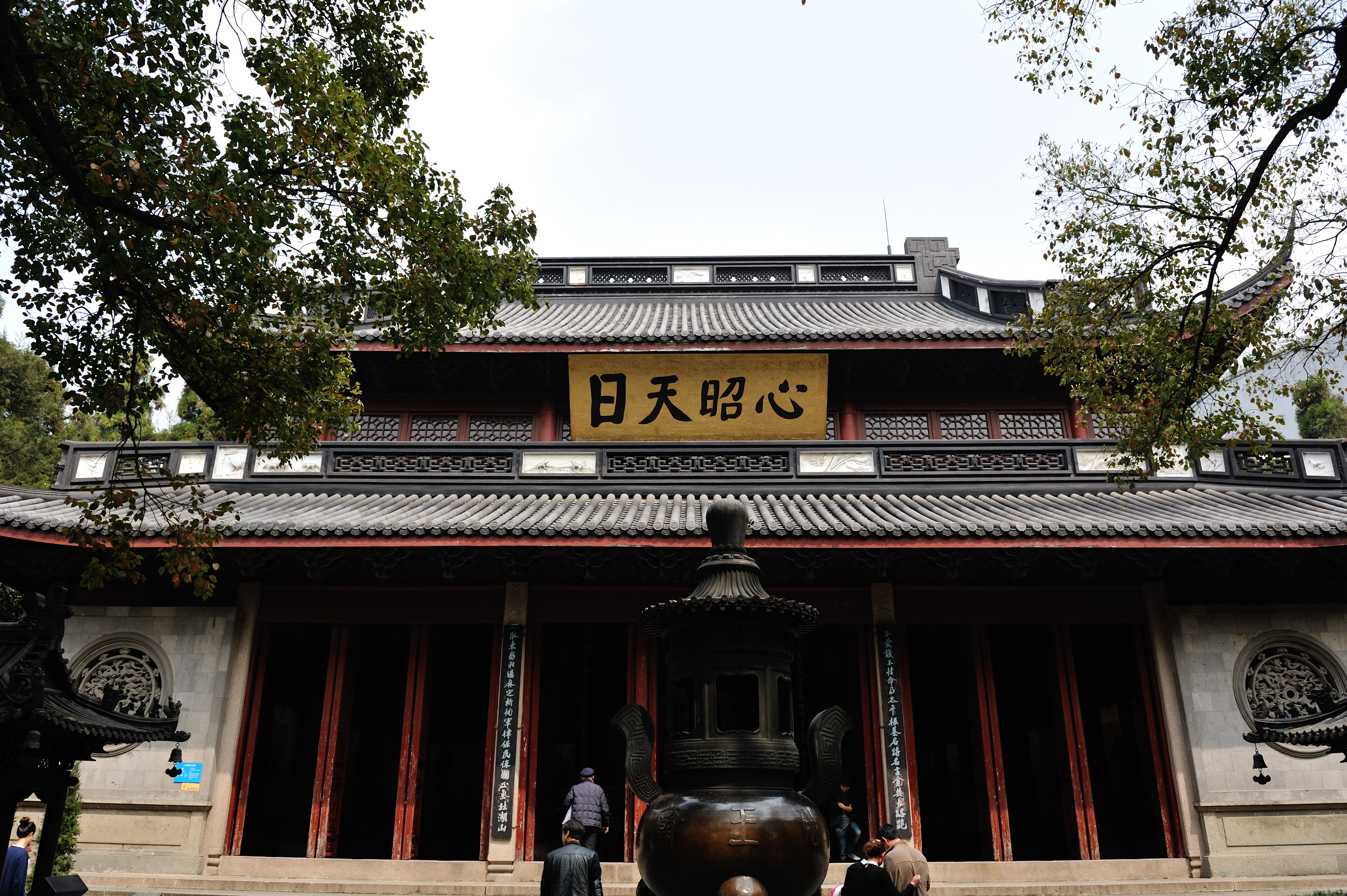
Temple of Loyalty (Zhonglieci)

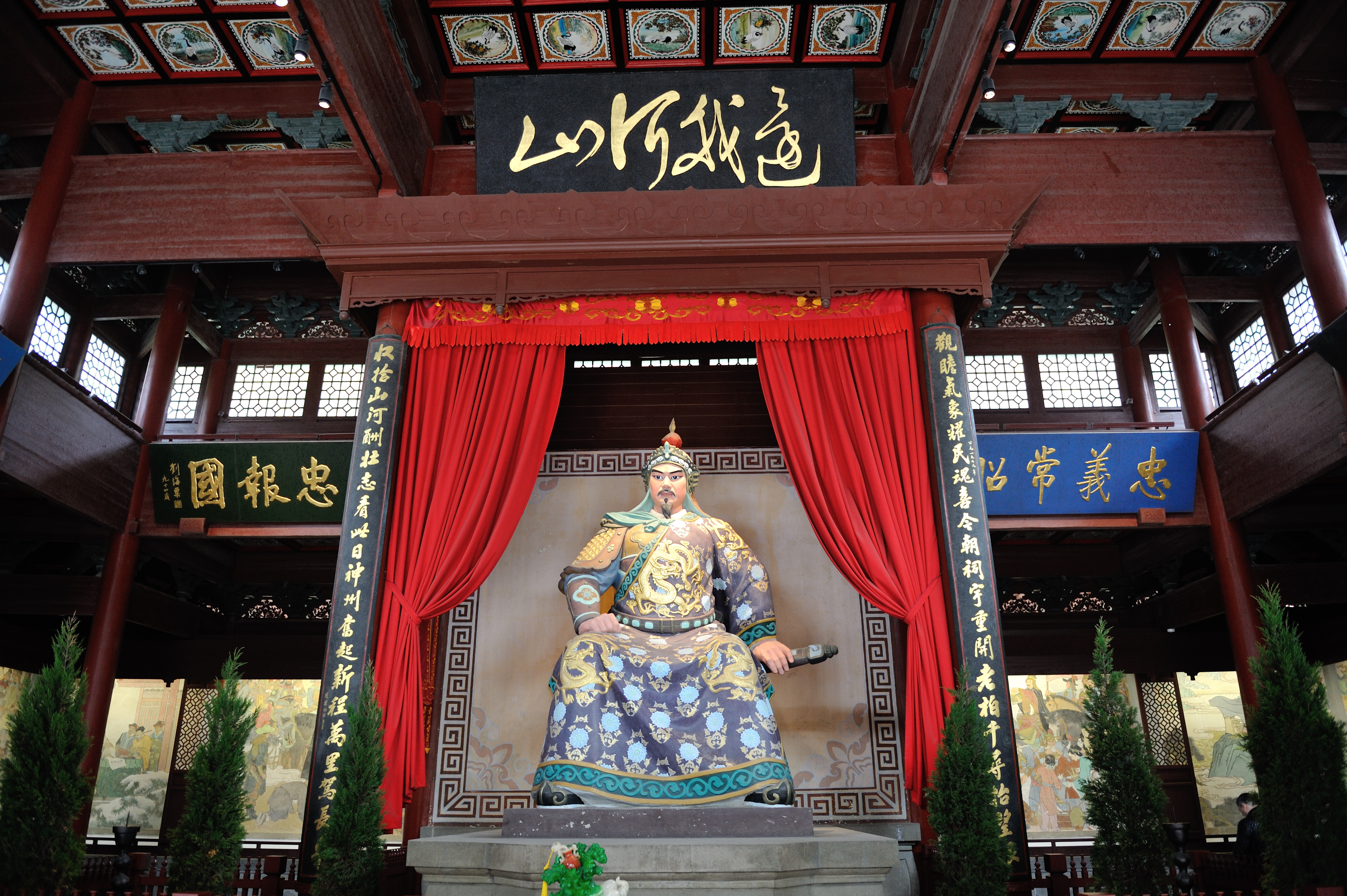
Temple statue of Yue Fei

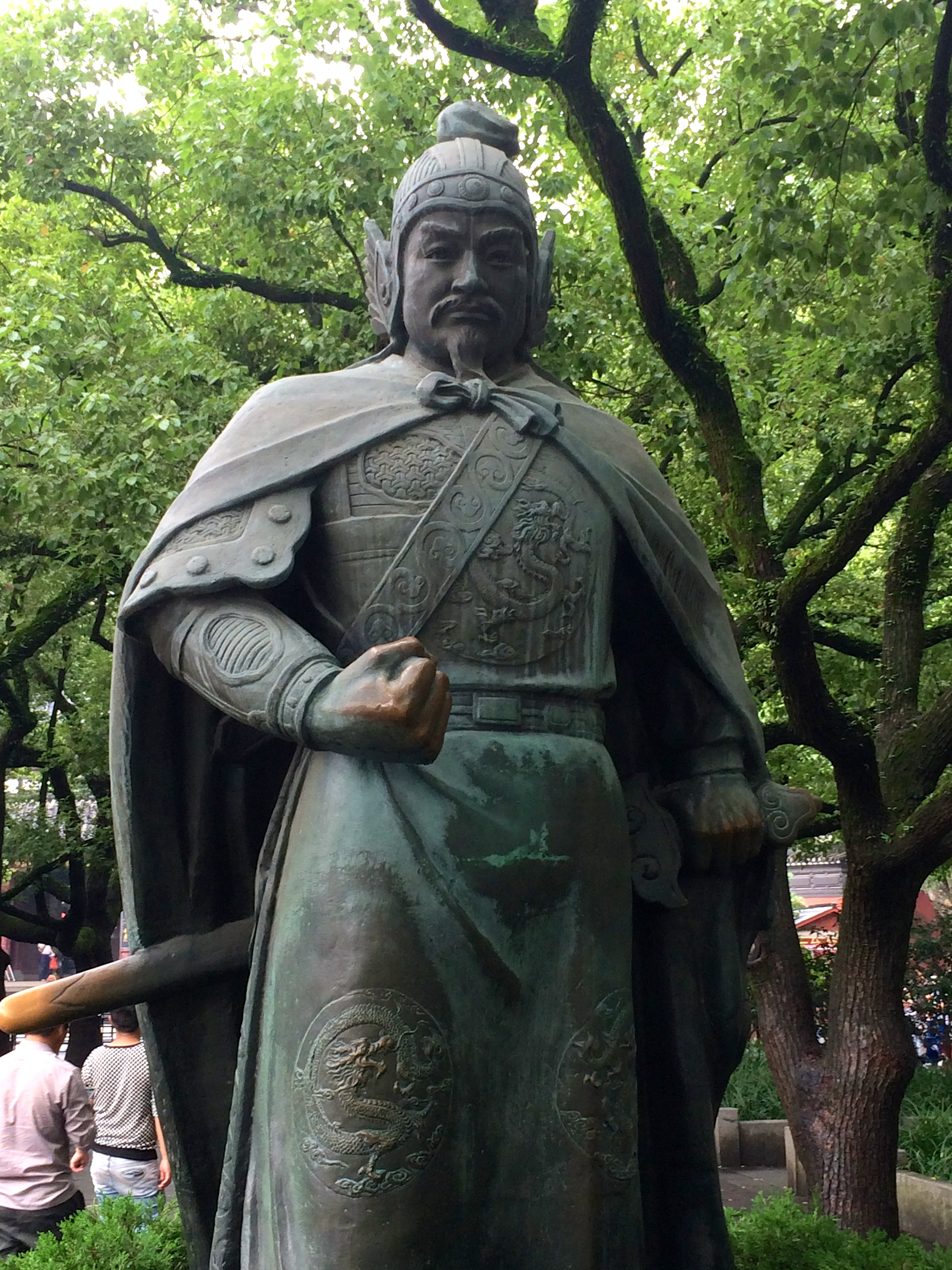
Sculpture of Yue Fei on the temple grounds

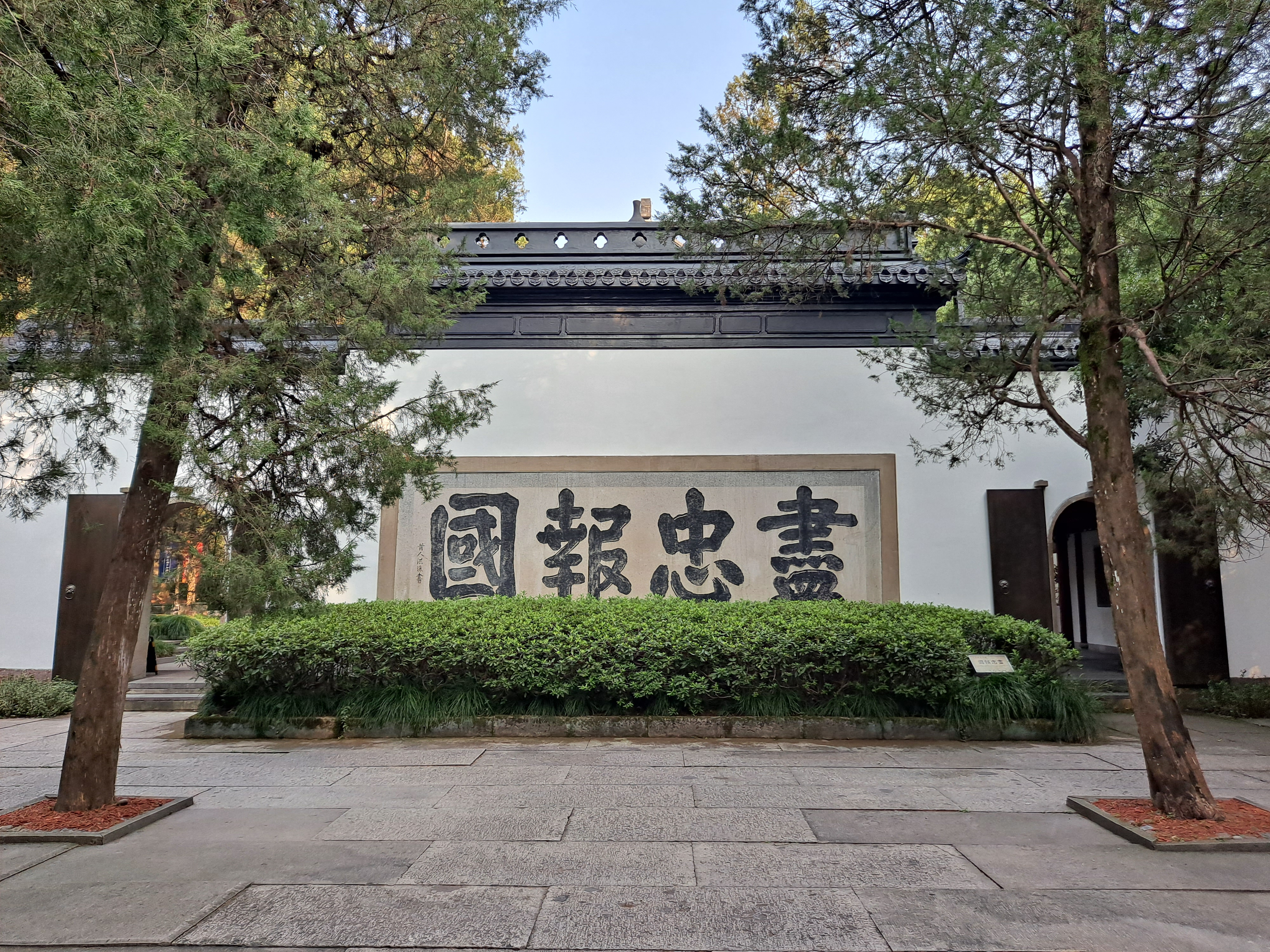
Screen wall decorated 盡忠報國 (Jìnzhōng Bàoguó, "Repaying the Country with Exhaustive Devotion"), the motto Yue Fei supposedly had tattooed across his back

== See also ==
- Media about Yue Fei
- History of the Song Dynasty
- Jin campaigns against the Song Dynasty (Timeline)
