= Tomb of Yue Fei =

Song dynasty tomb in China

Coordinates: 30°15′17″N 120°07′46″E

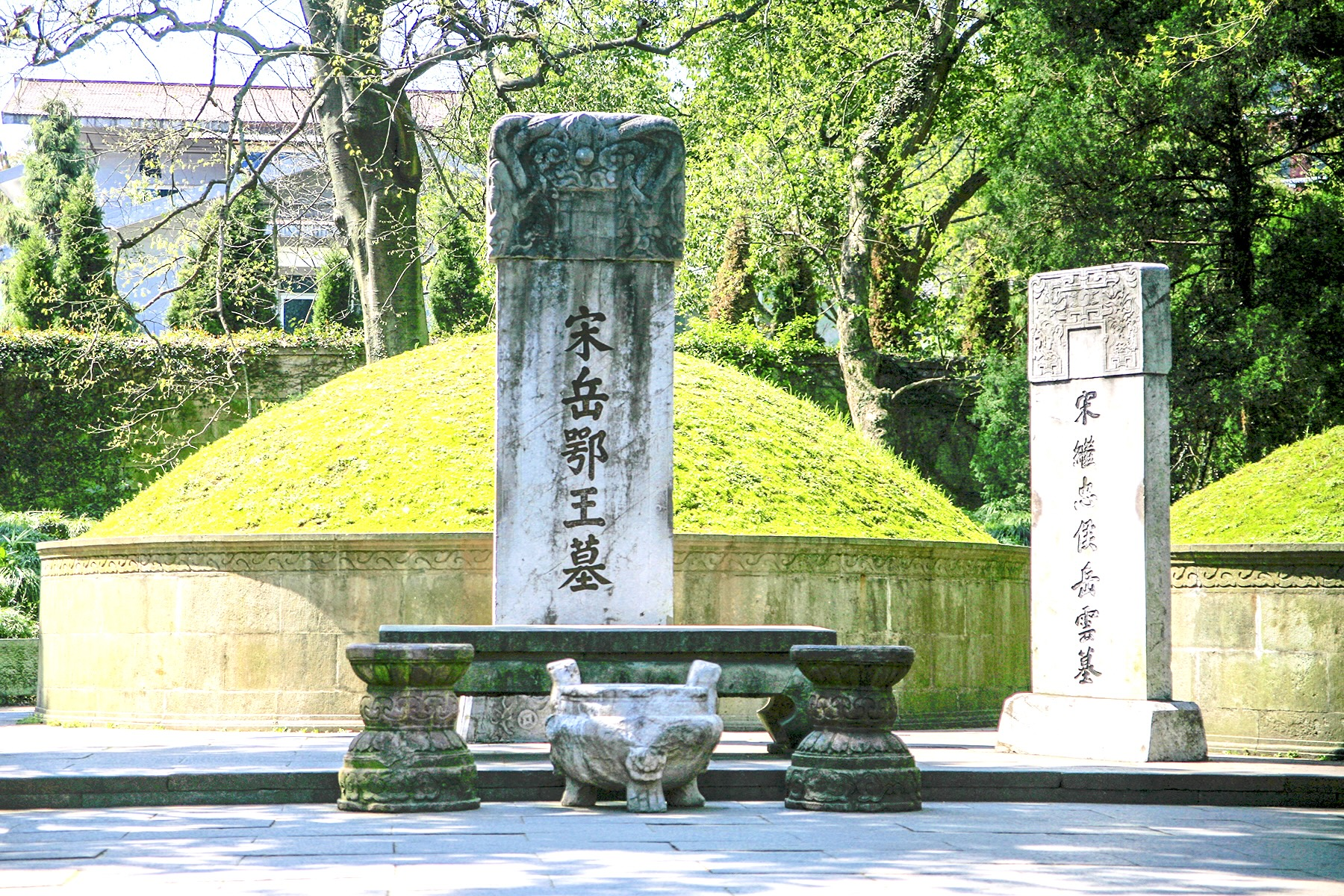
- Reconstructed tombs of Yue Fei and his son Yue Yun (2010)
- Traditional Chinese: 岳墳
- Simplified Chinese: 岳坟
- Literal meaning: Tomb of Yue
Transcriptions
Standard Mandarin
- Hanyu Pinyin: Yuè Fén
- Wade–Giles: Yüeh Fen

Alternative Chinese name
- Traditional Chinese: 岳飛墓
- Simplified Chinese: 岳飞墓
- Literal meaning: Tomb of Yue Fei
Transcriptions
Standard Mandarin
- Hanyu Pinyin: Yuè Fēi Mù
- Wade–Giles: Yüeh Fei Mu

Second alternative Chinese name
- Chinese: 宋岳鄂王墓
- Literal meaning: Tomb of Yue, King or Prince of E under the Song
Transcriptions
Standard Mandarin
- Hanyu Pinyin: Sòng Yuè Èwáng Mù
- Wade–Giles: Sung Yüeh O-wang Mu

The Tomb of Yue Fei, also known by its Chinese names Yue Fen and Yue Fei Mu, is the traditional Chinese tomb of the Song-era general Yue Fei located at his temple south of Qixia Hill (栖霞岭) and northwest of West Lake in Hangzhou, the capital of Zhejiang Province in eastern China. The site has been revered for centuries as a memorial to Yue's unflagging patriotism and self-sacrifice, although its associations with Han chauvinism and feudal values have sometimes been problematic. Heavily damaged during the Cultural Revolution, Yue Fei's tomb, the adjacent tomb of his son Yue Yun, and their spirit way have since been restored to their general appearance under the Song.

== History ==
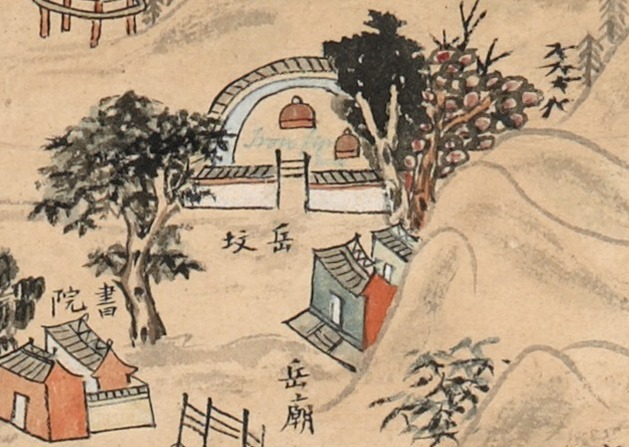
Detail of the tombs of Yue Fei and Yue Yun from a c. 1720 Chinese map of Hangzhou and West Lake

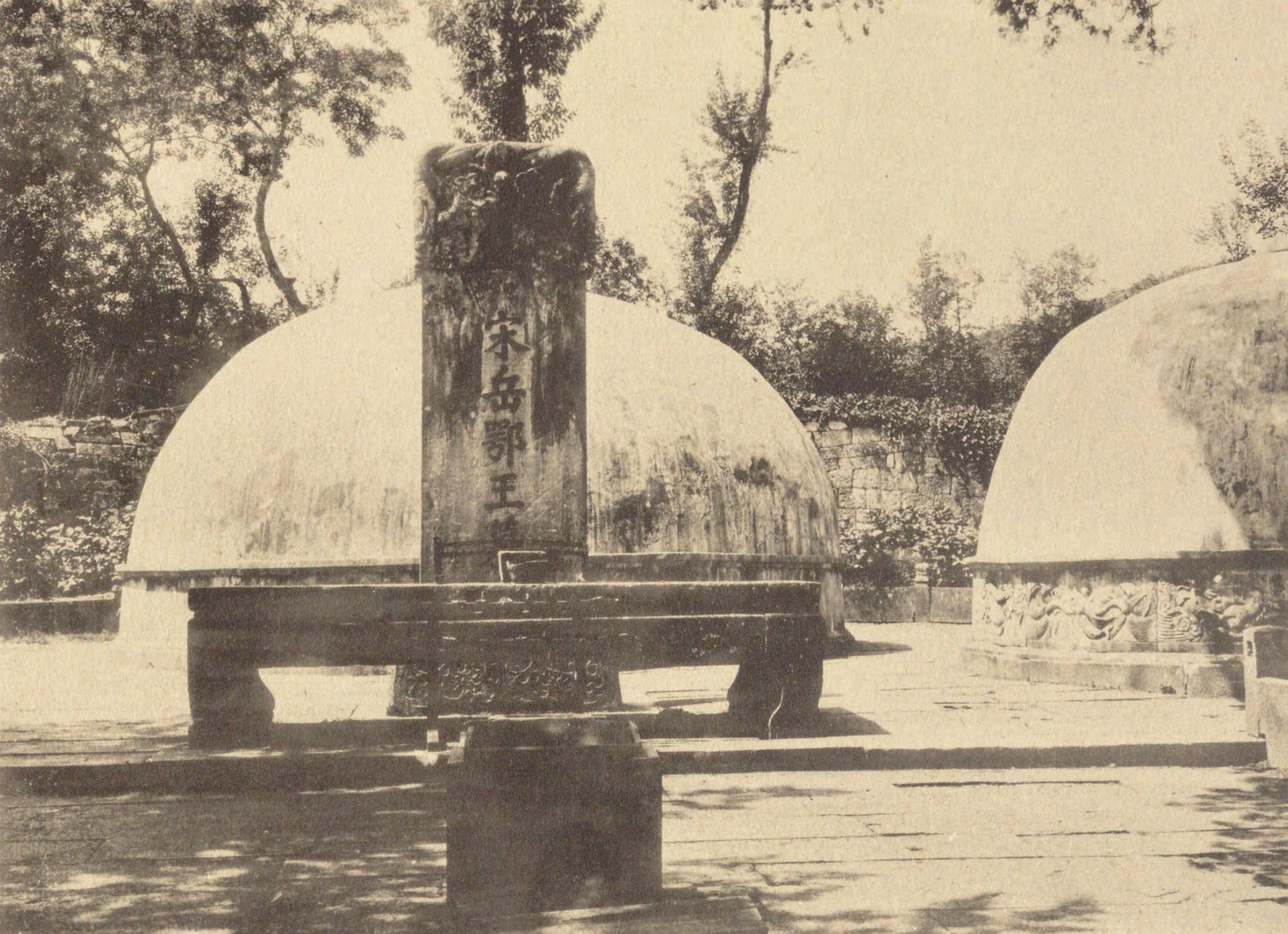
The tombs near the end of the Qing dynasty (1907)

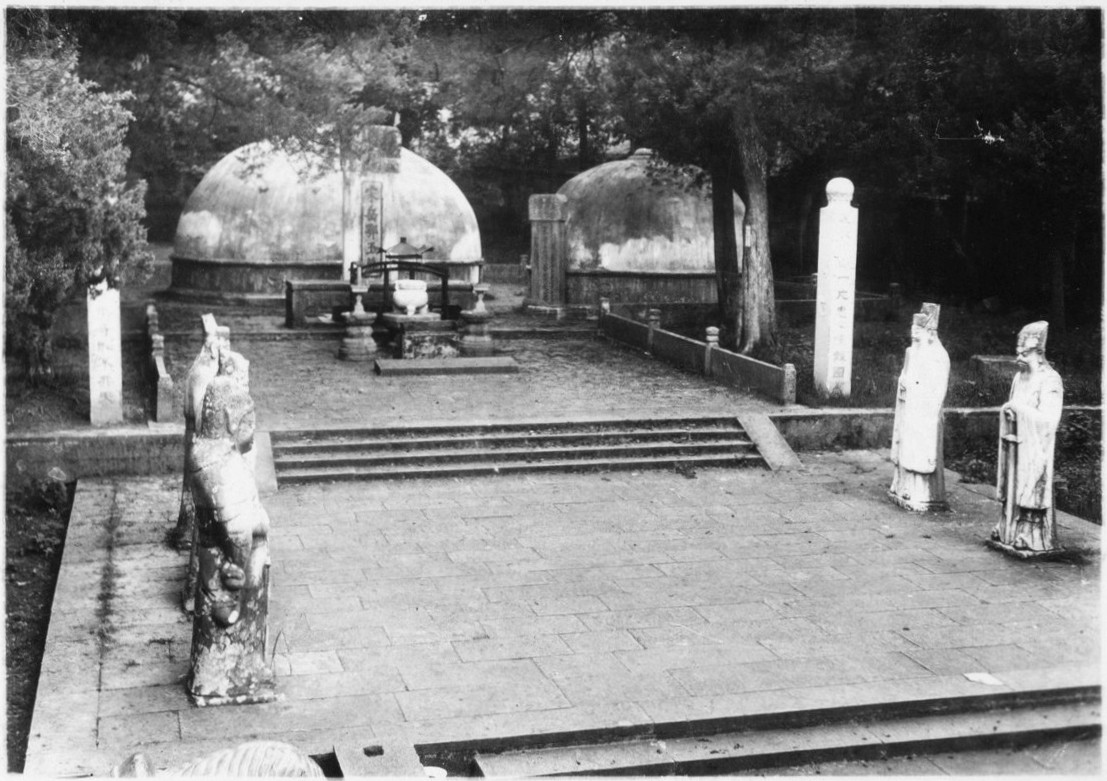
The tombs with their spirit way during the Japanese occupation of Hangzhou (1938)

Yue Fei was a low-born soldier of the Song Empire who rose to the rank of general during its suppression of peasant uprisings and its wars with the invading Jurchen Jin. Steadfastly committed to Song's reconquest of northern China, Yue was ultimately executed by the Southern Song emperor Gaozong due to court intrigue and to political pressures during his peace negotiations with the Jin. In the most common account, he was initially buried at Jiuqucong Temple (九曲叢祠) near Baoshi Hill outside the city wall's northwestern Qiantang Gate. Upon the resumption of hostilities two decades later, Gaozong retired from the throne and repented the manner of Yue's death, blaming his decisions on wicked advisors. His successor Xiaozong posthumously exonerated Yue and had his corpse reburied at its present site in 1163. Later Song emperors subsequently elevated Yue to royal status and venerated his memory at a nearby temple.

Yue's legacy was largely ignored by the Yuan but was greatly promoted by the Ming, who established the sculptures along the tomb's spirit way. Kneeling figures of Yue's wife and two sons were added in 1513. It was also under the Ming that the bound and kneeling statues of the official villains in Yue's death began to be ritually defiled.

Yue became so associated with Han patriotism and opposition to foreign rule that the Kangxi Emperor of the Qing—who considered themselves heirs of the Jurchen Jin legacy—pointedly avoided the tomb during his southern tours, despite repeatedly staying at nearby Gushan in West Lake. On his own tours, the Qianlong Emperor repeatedly visited the tomb while recasting Yue's legacy as one of selfless devotion to China's legitimate imperial dynasty, denying that status to the Jin but upholding it for the Qing themselves. Yue was subsequently revered as a hero both by republican opponents of the Qing and by Han who served the dynasty even in its role as Imperial Japanese puppets during World War II. The tomb was declared a national monument of the People's Republic of China in 1961. Nonetheless, following the destruction of the Tomb of Su Xiaoxiao by high-school Red Guards on 23 August 1966 at the outset of the Cultural Revolution, some Hangzhou University students publicly denounced Yue as a class traitor and feudal oppressor and destroyed the tomb, including breaking or burning the many memorial placards that had been left by notable visitors over the centuries. The terracotta statue of Yue was destroyed and samples of his own calligraphy were defaced. The site was then used for materials denouncing feudal exploitation.

Despite ransacking the site thoroughly enough to make rediscovering the tomb a difficult task, the Red Guards apparently lacked the tools for fully destroying the larger stone statues of the grave's spirit way and left Yue's bones in place. Shock and anger at the destruction of Yue's tomb also galvanized the people of Hangzhou to openly oppose further destruction of the city's historical sites, particularly a planned attack on the Lingyin Temple. Following the elevation of Deng Xiaoping as China's paramount leader, the site was rebuilt in July 1979 to restore its presumed appearance under the Song. The reconstruction was stated to have cost 400,000 RMB and employed 56,000 workers. The nine frescoes depicting Yue Fei's life were added shortly afterwards in 1981.

== Layout ==
The tomb of Yue Fei lies at the end of a small spirit way. To its right is the tomb of his son Yue Yun. The tombs were originally constructed with circular bases of ashlar stone. Under the Qing, the mounds on top were covered with thin bricks. This was covered with plaster in the early republican period. After their reconstruction in 1979, the circular bases were decorated but the tops left as bare earth covered with grass, an attempt to restore the site to its condition under the Song by following their usual burial practices.

There are also galleries on each side of the spirit way. In the northern gallery are tablets inscribed with Yue's poems and his memorials to Emperor Gaozong. In the southern gallery are tablets inscribed with the most famous poems written about Yue's legacy in subsequent ages.

Near the tombs are four cast-iron figures with chests bare and bound hands in the manner of medieval captives. They represent the official culprits blamed for Yue's "murder" after Emperor Gaozong's own change of heart: the chancellor Qin Hui, his wife Lady Wang (王氏), the general Zhang Jun, and the censor Moqi Xie. As late as the early 20th century, it was common for male visitors to spit, urinate, and defecate on the statues as an enduring denunciation of their actions. The damage was extensive enough—sometimes including beatings and beheadings—that the statues needed to be replaced several times under the Ming and Qing. The tradition is now discouraged, with signs asking visitors to refrain from spitting.

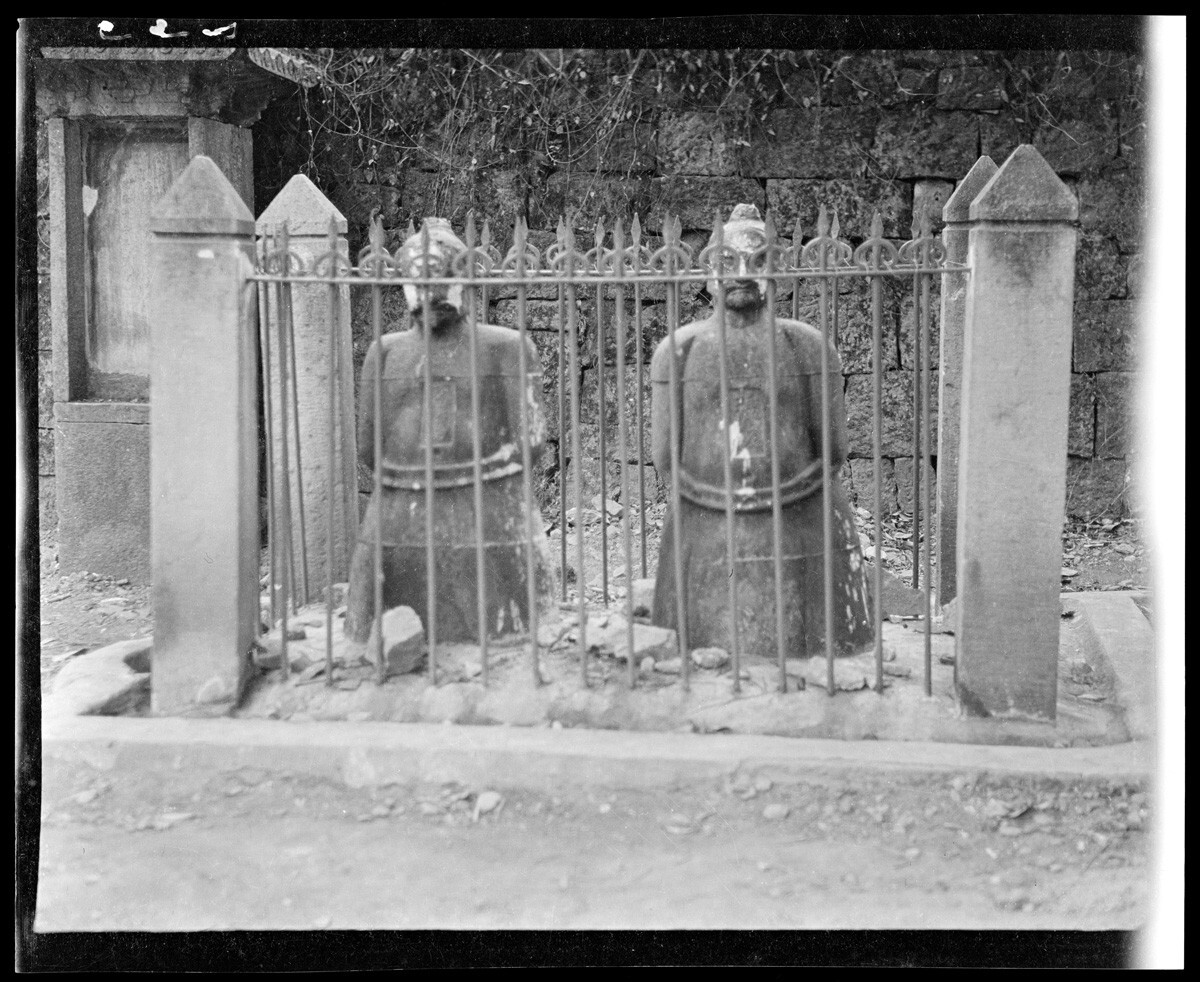
The befouled statues of Moqi Xie and Zhang Jun (1919)

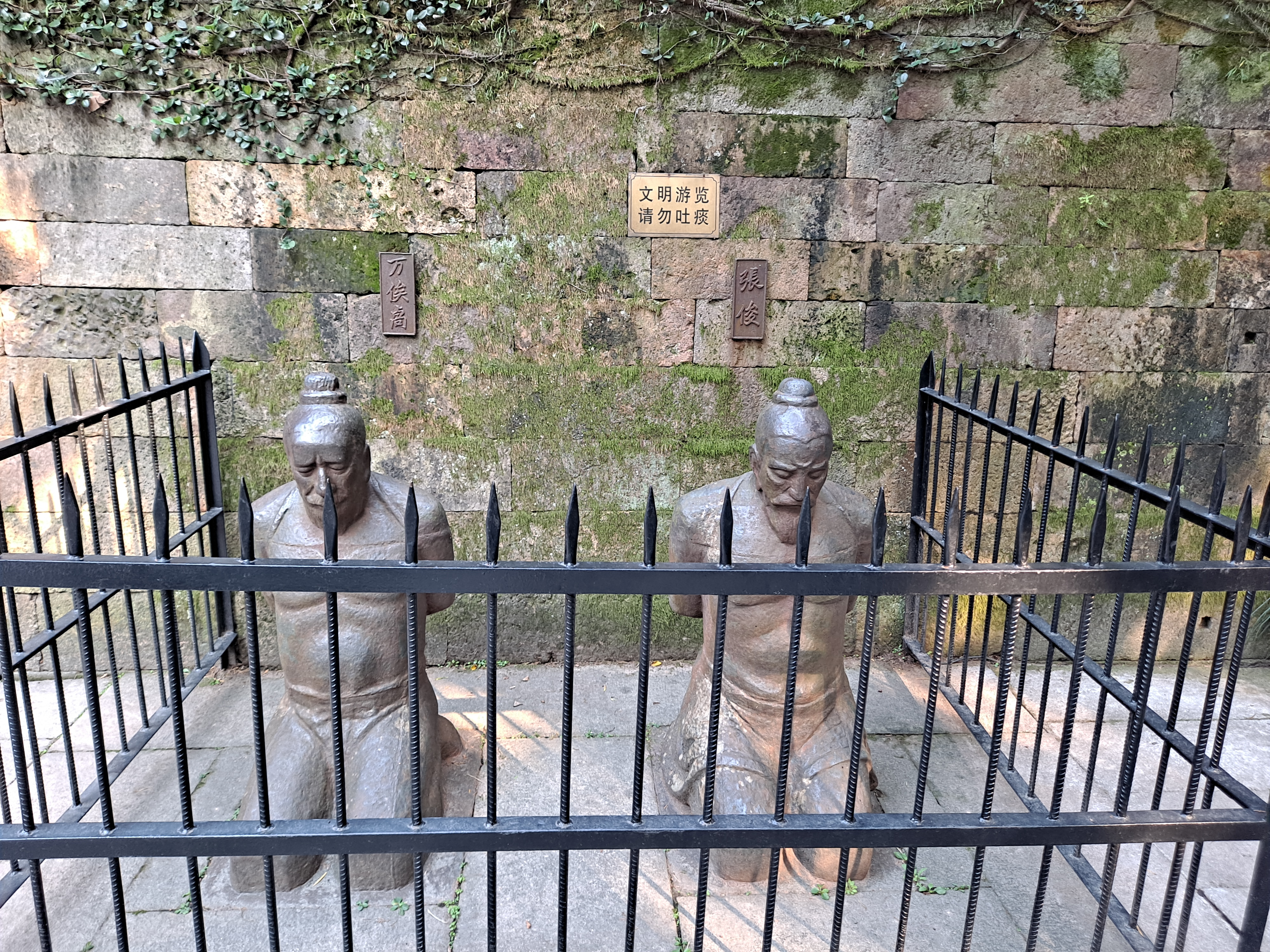
The present statues, beneath a 'No Spitting' sign

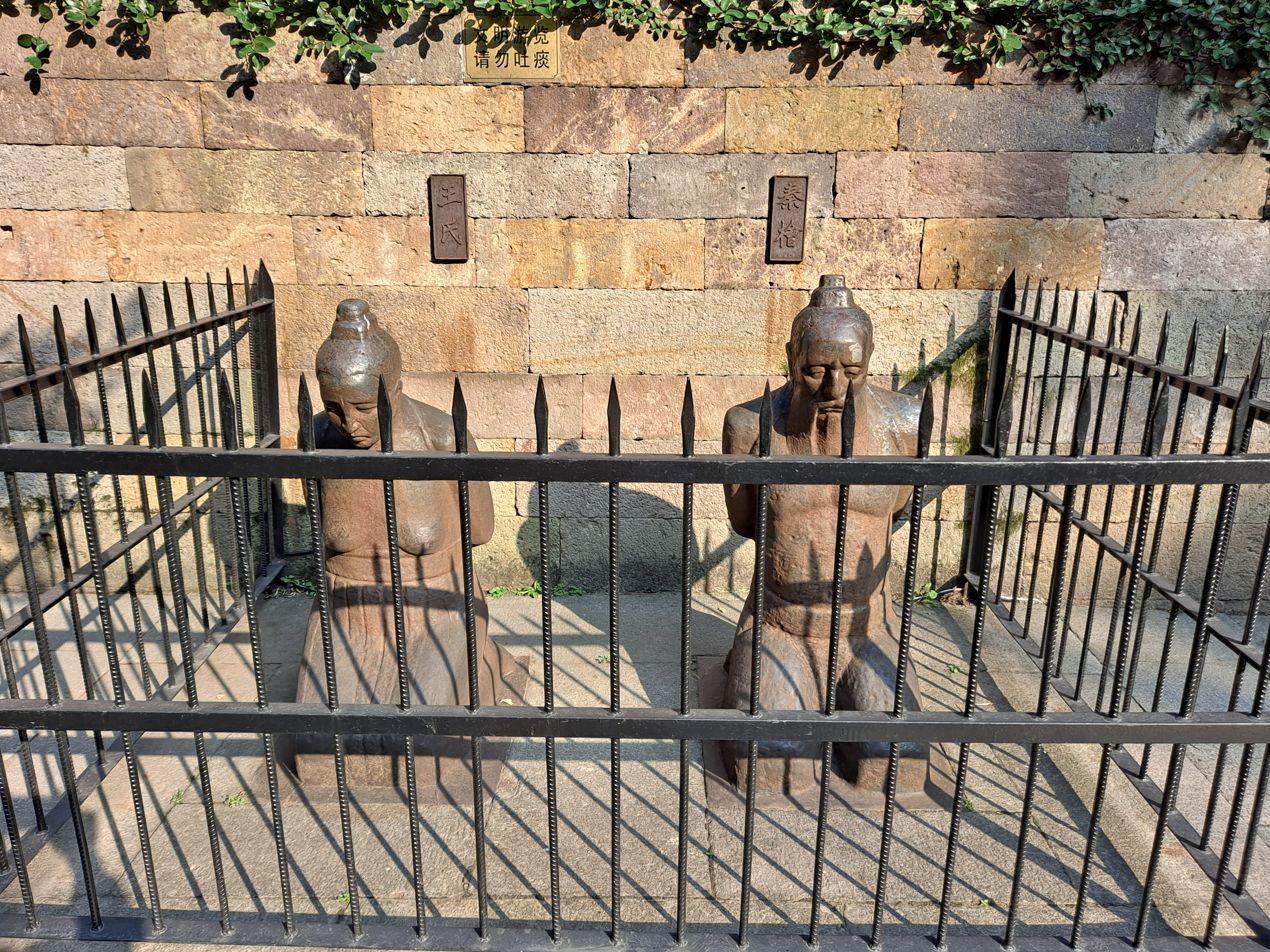
The present statues of Qin Hui and Lady Wang

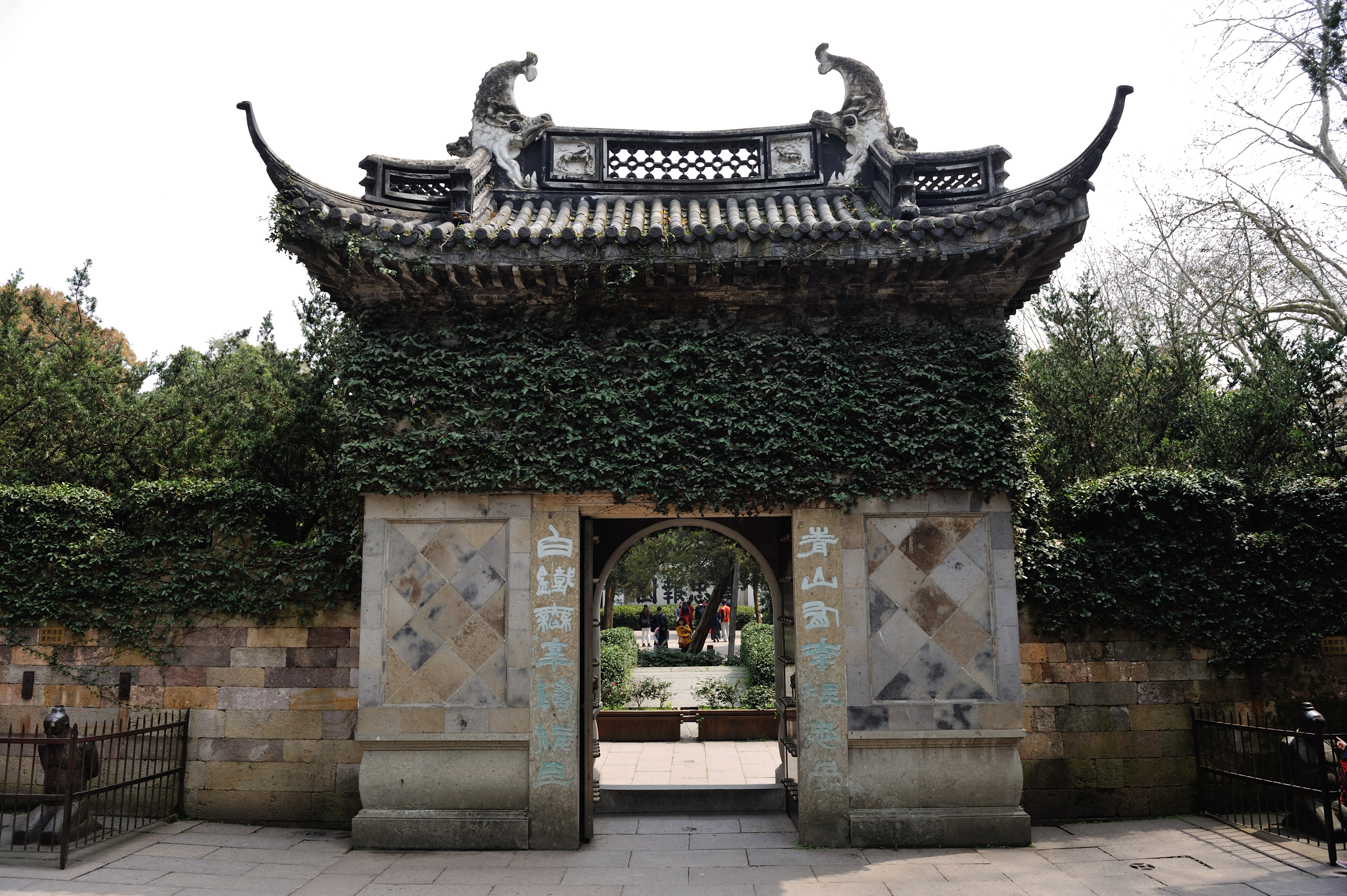
The position of the statues, flanking the tombs' entrance gate

== See also ==
- History of the Song Dynasty
- Jin–Song Wars (Timeline)
