= Zhang Shenfu =

Chinese philosopher

- 张申府
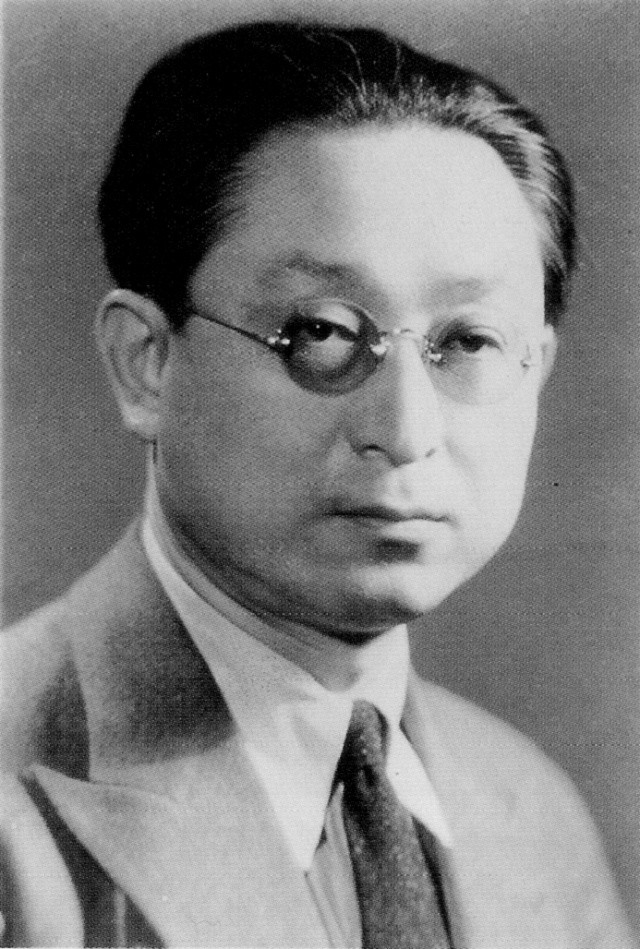
- Born: 张崧年; June 15, 1893
- Died: June 20, 1986 (aged 93)
- Education: Peking University
- Occupations: Academic, intellectual
- Political party: Chinese Communist Party

Zhang Shenfu (Chinese: 张申府; September 15, 1893 – June 20, 1986), born Zhang Songnian (张崧年), courtesy name Shenfu (申甫), was a founder of the Chinese Communist Party, a philosopher, and a political activist. Zhang was born on June 15, 1893, in Xiaoduo village, Zhili (modern Hebei). His father, Zhang Liangong, was a senior official. In 1912, Zhang enrolled at Middle School Affiliated to Senior Normal School (高等师范学堂附属中学班) in Beiping (today Beijing). He later enrolled at Peking University to study philosophy and math in 1914. After graduating, Zhang started to lecture at Peking University, as well as assisting the work of university librarian Li Dazhao. When the Chinese Communist Party was founded by Chen Duxiu and Li Dazhao in the French concession of Shanghai in 1921 as a study society and informal network, Zhang organized the counterpart group in France (later used to engage in Lyon Sino-French University after WWI) and then introduced his fiancée Liu Qingyang and friend Zhou Enlai to CCP.

In 1925, due to disagreements with other representatives at the fourth congress, Zhang quit the party. After CCP won the Chinese Civil War, Zhang was employed as a researcher at the National Library with Zhou Enlai's permission. Due to his political stance, Zhang was labeled as right-wing in 1957 during the Anti-Rightist Campaign. After Mao's death and the 3rd plenary session of the 11th Central Committee of the Chinese Communist Party, he was rehabilitated. He died in 1986 at 93 years old.

== See also ==
- Qu Qiubai
- History of the Chinese Communist Party
