= Chinese school of international relations =

Blend of Western Realism and Chinese historical concepts

The Chinese School of International Relations is a body of international relations (IR) theory developed predominantly by Chinese scholars. It seeks to explain international politics through concepts derived from Chinese philosophy, history and China’s experience within the current international system. The school emerged from debates among Chinese scholars in the 1990s and 2000s, developing partly as a response to perceived Western, particularly American theories of IR and calls for greater theoretical pluralism within IR.

Rather than constituting a single unified theory, the Chinese School of International Relations includes several competing approaches. The most prominent are Yan Xuetong’s moral realism, Qin Yaqing’s relational theory and Symbiosis (‘Gongsheng’) theory. Other notable theories include tianxia ('all under heaven') and other works on the historical tribute system.

Supporters regard the Chinese School of International Relations as a significant contributor to Global IR and non-Western IR theory, taking on Chinese intellectual traditions to widen a discipline long dominated by Western perspectives. Critics argue its major approaches remain heavily influenced by existing Western frameworks and risk cultural essentialism, romanticisation of the past or new forms of Sinocentrism. As a result, scholars continue debating whether the Chinese School of International Relations constitutes a distinct alternative to mainstream IR theory or primarily reinterprets established theories through Chinese concepts and historical experience.

== Moral realism ==
Moral realism, also called the Tsinghua approach, is a strand of the Chinese school associated with Yan Xuetong of Tsinghua University. Zhang Feng coined the label in 2012, and Yan later adopted it. The project began in 2005, when Yan’s team started studying pre-Qin interstate political thought, especially the philosopher Xunzi.

The theory argues that the rise and fall of great powers depends on the quality of their leadership. A state’s position determines its interests, but its leaders’ preferences decide how it pursues them. Yan sorts international leadership into four types by morality: humane authority practices the values it professes; hegemony applies a double standard to allies and rivals; tyranny disregards perceived morality to preserve institutional power; and anemocracy does so for the leader’s personal benefit. This classification suggests that material capabilities alone cannot fully explain the outcomes of great-power competition. Morality is treated as a tool for gaining international support rather than a value in itself. Yan argues that humane authority is most likely to win great-power competition.

Critics argue that the approach romanticizes ancient Chinese history and underestimates the impact of hard power. Others say it risks monopolizing morality, and Zhang Feng warned it could be read as advocating Chinese hegemony. Nele Noesselt sees Chinese IR theory generally as serving national interests and legitimizing one-party rule. Toni Erskine and Liane Hartnett argue that it is unclear whether the theory treats the state as having intrinsic or instrumental value.

Yan responds that moral realism is a descriptive, explanatory theory applicable to any major power, citing Franklin D. Roosevelt’s administration as a humane authority and Nazi Germany as tyrannic one. He also stresses that its policy advice is probabilistic rather than prescriptive, meaning it describes what is most likely to succeed.

== Tianxia ==
Tianxia (“all under heaven”) is a classical Chinese concept that the philosopher Zhao Tingyang reworked into a theory of world order. Zhao gives it three meanings: the earth, the “hearts of all peoples,” and a world institution modelled on one family. Tianxia’s legitimacy rests on popular allegiance rather than conquest, with political order organized hierarchically from Tianxia to states and, ultimately, families. By seeing the world, rather than the state, as the primary political unit, Zhao argues that Western approaches to international order remain constrained by the nation-state framework.

He further argues that philosophies centered on either the individual or the nation tend to generate conflict, whereas Chinese thought seeks to transform enemies into friends. The Tianxia system is, in principle, open to any qualified candidate who demonstrates the greatest understanding of "the Way", rather than being reserved for a superpower. Also, an empire of this kind should serve as an exemplar rather than a missionary. Nevertheless, Zhao acknowledges that no Chinese dynasty has ever fully realised Tianxia. The historical tributary system is a useful reference point but is not equivalent to Tianxia.

Critics, however, question the universal character of the concept. Some argue that Tianxia represents a new form of hegemony, adapting the hierarchical governance of imperial China to the twenty-first century. Callahan argues that Tianxia can also refer to China itself, suggesting that the theory ultimately re-centres Chinese understandings of world order. On a similar note Zhang Shuguang and Zhou Fangyin accuse Zhao of applying double standards when evaluating Chinese and Western philosophical traditions. Chang Chi-shen challenges the historical foundations of the theory, arguing that the Zhou system never encompassed the entire world and primarily served to legitimise the ruling dynasty.

Xu defends Zhao against these criticisms, arguing that critics incorrectly assume that Tianxia necessarily entails Chinese leadership and conflate the concept with the historical tributary system in China. Zhao himself describes Tianxia as “of all and for all”, presenting it as a philosophical framework for world order rather than a concrete policy proposal. In response to the argument that Tianxia contradicts core Confucian values, Xu points out that Zhao draws on both Chinese and Western philosophical traditions and has never claimed that his theory rests exclusively on Confucian thought.

== Relational Theory ==
Drawing on Chinese Confucianism, Qin Yaqing challenges mainstream Western IR theories that view states as independent, self-contained units with a fixed, intrinsic identity. Instead, he introduces the relational theory, which argues that states exist only in relation to one another. The primary unit of reality is therefore not the states but their relationships. In this light, their identity, behaviour, and position within the international order are continually constructed and reconstructed through dynamic social interactions.

Qin also critiques Western IR theories’ focus on Hegelian dialectics, which tend to split reality into binary oppositions, including subject/object, self/other, and conflict/cooperation. By contrast, Chinese relational theory is rooted in the Zhongyong (Doctrine of the Mean) dialectic of complementarity, symbolised by the Yin-Yang. Within this framework, opposing forces are not mutually exclusive but mutually constitutive. By extension, enemies are relational partners in a temporary state of imbalance. Reconciling them requires continually adjusting the relationship as circumstances change so that no side dominates and harmony is maintained.

Finally, Qin introduces a "logic of relationality" under which states act according to their specific relationships with one another, rather than out of pure self-interest. This means that power flows not only from material resources but also from the relationships states build, which can help them gain influence and foster cooperation.

Critics argue that Qin’s relational theory creates a rigid East-West dichotomy between a relational China and a rational West. In doing so, it reduces Western thought to a Hegelian tradition that pits the self against the other and places conflict at the core of identity. This overlooks inherently relational Western frameworks, including Marxism and Bourdieu's field theory. Moreover, Rosenberg challenges the Chinese credentials of Qin’s theory, noting that it draws directly on American constructivism. For others, Qin’s emphasis on harmony fails to account for hierarchy and power inequalities. Guzzini also questions the assumption that closeness fosters cooperation, citing the Sino-Soviet rivalry during the Cold War.

Qin explains that distinguishing Western from non-Western thought does not, in itself, create a dichotomy. Such a binary arises only when the two are treated as irreconcilable opposites, whereas he sees them as complementary. He also describes his engagement with constructivism as "a process of learning and of critical reflections".

== Symbiotic theory ==
Gongsheng, or symbiotic theory, adapts the Confucian and Daoist ideas of co-survival and co-growth. It was introduced to the social sciences by the Fudan University sociologist Hu Shoujun. Jin Yingzhong of the Shanghai Society of International Relations was among the first to apply it to international relations in 2011. He argued that because no state has all the resources it needs, states are bound together in structures of mutuality. In 2013, the Fudan scholars Ren Xiao and Su Changhe published papers that established gongsheng as a school of thought, often called the “Shanghai school.” It is now regarded as one of the four branches of the Chinese school, alongside moral realism, Tianxia and relational theory.

Ren argues that the United States-led international order relies on “homogeneous symbiosis,” which is the assumption that states must be alike to cooperate, for example all democracies. In his interpretation, difference breeds mistrust and encourages the more powerful states to make other countries more like themselves by pressuring them to adopt the same systems. He proposes instead “heterogeneous symbiosis”, which treats diversity as “a fundamental reality” and an opportunity for mutual development. Gongsheng therefore goes beyond merely “surviving together” and extends to “growing together” through mutual learning. Su Changhe notes that gongsheng “does not mean the absence of conflict,” but the theory rejects viewing states as opposing sides. Unlike liberalism, it does not require states to be democracies in order to cooperate, and it favours sovereignty and non-intervention.

Ren applies the theory to East Asian history by reinterpreting the tributary system as a “gongsheng system” in which unequal states each had a secure place in a “polycentric” order. This system is sustained by trade, voluntary exchange and a shared acceptance of each other’s legitimacy. Su has called for a “symbiotic international system” based on “partnerships, not alliances.” Ren has also proposed “gongsheng peace,” the idea that peace can be achieved without a world government but instead through states remaining connected without having to become alike. Most of the school’s proponents publish only in Chinese, and the theory remains little known outside China.

Critics of this theory, such as Barry Buzan, have questioned whether the theory’s emphasis on equality between states can be rooted in China’s historically hierarchical traditions, noting its similarity to Western ideas such as English School pluralism. In response, Ren has argued that the theory is genuinely Chinese as it draws on the Confucian doctrine of ‘zhongyong’, which emphasises balance between opposites.

== Criticism ==
Scholars Xiao Ren, Stefano Guzzini, Toni Erskine and Peng Lu caution that placing the works of Chinese international relations researchers under one school of international relations downplays the differences among their theoretical approaches. Compared to the Chinese school, other schools with geography-based names, like the English school or the Copenhagen school, cover a narrower set of assumptions. Barry Buzan acknowledges that the Chinese school challenges Eurocentrism within international relations. However, Buzan suggests that as the discipline developed in China, the label should be abandoned, because it risks creating disagreements about who falls under it.

Peng Lu argues that the Chinese school displays a sino-centric bias. The sinocentrism leads to selective scrutiny, as many scholars do not apply the same critical standards to Chinese experience as they do to the foreign experience. The school also risks exaggerating the uniqueness of Chinese experience, for example, neglecting that many Chinese intellectuals since the mid-19th century have learned from Western thought. Peng Lu claims that this bias led to slow theory-building within the school.

From the perspective of critical international relations theory, the Chinese school risks essentialising and romanticising the "Chinese culture" as homogeneous and unchanging and legitimising the Chinese government's foreign policy. Yih-Jye Hwang acknowledges that the Chinese school exhibits essentialism~~,~~ but explains that a degree of strategic essentialism is necessary for non-Western scholars to challenge the Western hegemony within international relations. Despite these shortcomings, the school still encourages scholars to examine world politics through new perspectives from Chinese philosophy, history and culture.

Justin Rosenberg argues that because the Chinese school mostly relies on classical Chinese concepts like Gongsheng and Tianxia, it has nothing to say on capitalism, which Rosenberg regards as the most important aspect of modern international relations. Similarly to Peng Lu, Rosenberg also cautions that the Chinese school risks overemphasising the differences between the East and the West. For example, Rosenberg highlights that, similar to relational theory, Marxism also critiques "individualistic rationality" and focuses on relations.

== See also ==
- International relations theory
