= Cui Qiming =

Chinese diplomat

- 崔启明

Communist Party Secretary of China Foreign Affairs University
- Incumbent
- Assumed office October 2020
- President: Xu Jian; Wang Fan
- Preceded by: Qi Dayu

Chinese Ambassador to Belarus
- In office January 2014 – September 2020
- Preceded by: Gong Jianwei
- Succeeded by: Xie Xiaoyong

Personal details
- Born: November 1963 (age 62) China
- Party: Chinese Communist Party
- Education: Central China Normal University

Chinese name
- Simplified Chinese: 崔启明
- Traditional Chinese: 崔啟明
Transcriptions
Standard Mandarin
- Hanyu Pinyin: Cuī Qǐmíng

Cui Qiming (Chinese: 崔启明; pinyin: Cuī Qǐmíng; born November 1963) is a Chinese diplomat who is the current Communist Party Secretary of China Foreign Affairs University, in office since October 2020.

== Biography ==
Born in November 1963, Cui graduated from Central China Normal University. He joined the Foreign Service in 1992 and has served primarily in the Department of Eastern European and Central Asian Affairs of the Ministry of Foreign Affairs and the Chinese Embassy in the Russian Federation. In 2005, he was assigned to the Comprehensive Bureau of the Office of the Central Foreign Affairs Commission, where he served as deputy director in 2006, and three years later promoted to the director position. In January 2014, President Xi Jinping appointed him Chinese Ambassador to Belarus, and he held this post from 2014 until 2020. In October 2020, he was chosen as party secretary of China Foreign Affairs University, succeeding Qi Dayu.

== Awards ==
- 22 September 2020 Order of Honor

Diplomatic posts
| Preceded by Gong Jianwei | Chinese Ambassador to Belarus; 2014–2020 | Succeeded by Xie Xiaoyong |
Party political offices
| Preceded by Qi Dayu | Communist Party Secretary of China Foreign Affairs University; 2020–present | Incumbent |
