= University of International Relations =

Public university in Beijing, China

- 国际关系学院
- Former name: Institute of International Relations
- Established: 1949; 77 years ago
- Parent institution: Ministry of State Security
- Location: Haidian, Beijing, China; 40.0021°N 116.2801°E
- Website: www.uir.cn

Chinese name
- Simplified Chinese: 国际关系学院
- Traditional Chinese: 國際關係學院
Transcriptions
Standard Mandarin
- Hanyu Pinyin: Guójì Guānxì Xuéyuàn

The University of International Relations (UIR) is a public university in Haidian, Beijing, China.

The Institute for International Relations, later translated into English as Institute of International Relations, was established in 1949 by the first premier of the People's Republic of China, Zhou Enlai, to train diplomats. It became one of the National Key Universities in 1960, and was one of the first in China to offer master's degrees. In 1983, the school became the first foreign studies institute in China to evolve into a comprehensive university.

The University of International Relations has offered a joint doctoral program with the China Institutes of Contemporary International Relations, the 11th Bureau of the Ministry of State Security (MSS), China's civilian intelligence agency. A 2011 report by the Open Source Enterprise stated, "CICIR appears to have a close relationship with the University of International Relations in Beijing, with nearly half of the organization's senior leadership — including President Cui Liru and Director of the CICIR Institute of American Studies Yuan Peng — having either taught or studied at the school."

== History ==
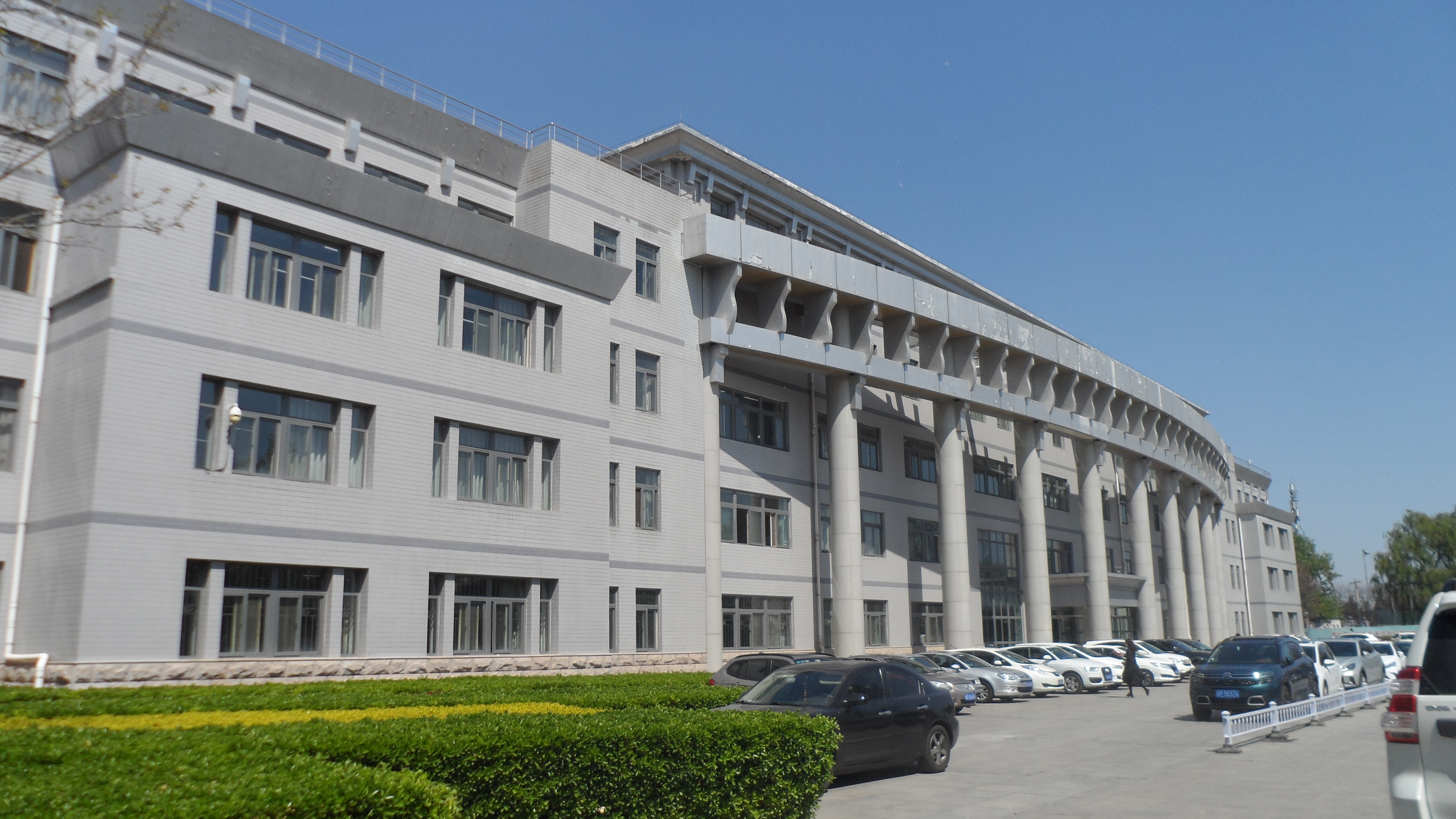
UIR main academic building

The University of International Relations was founded in 1949 to train foreign affairs cadres for the newly created People's Republic of China. In 1961, the school merged with then Foreign Affairs College.

In 1964, then-Premier Zhou Enlai ordered the creation of colleges and university departments to focus on international affairs. Several government agencies, including the Ministry of Foreign Affairs and the International Liaison Department of the Chinese Communist Party, established their own institutes for the study of international affairs. The University of International Relations was formally affiliated with the Ministry of Public Security in 1965, and was charged with training intelligence agents for the Central Investigation Department (both predecessors to the MSS) and for Xinhua News Agency.

Like many schools in China, the University of International Relations was shuttered during the Cultural Revolution and reopened in 1978.

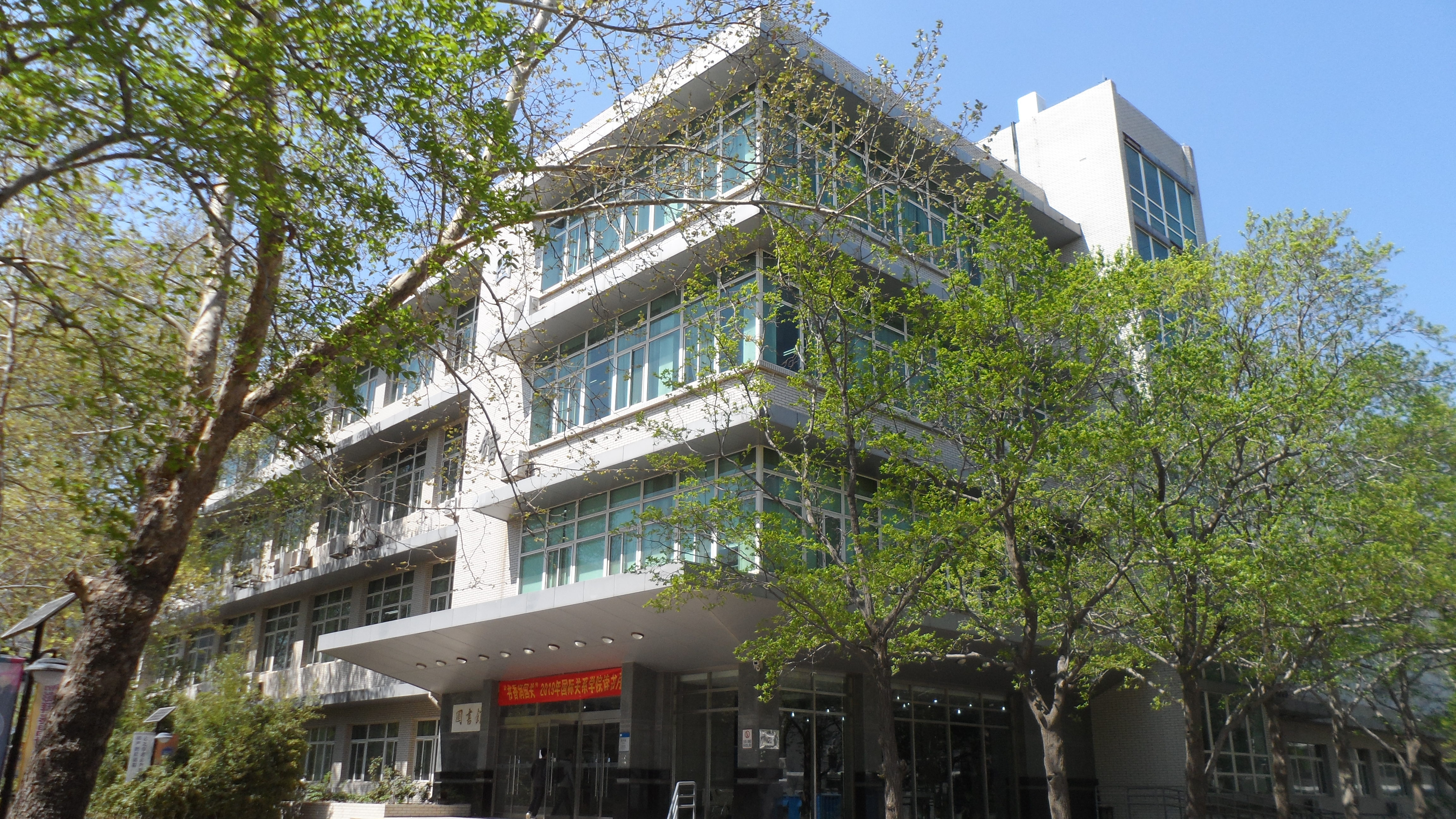
UIR library

In 1983, the school became the first foreign studies institute in China to evolve into a comprehensive university. In 2021, UIR was accredited to confer doctoral degrees in politics and master's degrees in national security.

== Affiliation ==
Despite claims from CCP sources that the University of International Relations operates under the direction of the Ministry of Education, the university does not appear on the Ministry of Education's list of subordinate universities, and every available academic source concludes that the university is an affiliate of the Ministry of State Security (MSS). Also, provincial government documents suggest that the UIR is affiliated with the MSS, mentioning it alongside Jiangnan Social University, a known MSS training institute. The university's campus is directly adjacent to the national headquarters of the MSS to the south and to the Central Party School of the Chinese Communist Party (CCP) to the west. According to Stratfor, "training for most MSS officers begins at the Beijing [campus of the] University of International Relations."

The Historical Dictionary of Chinese Intelligence states that the university's "relationship with the MSS is intended to be covert". According to József Boda of Hungary's National University of Public Service, the "UIR gives the MSS a way to work with foreign universities and academics to shape and learn about perceptions of the PRC's views on security. It also provides a platform for the MSS to identify talents, recruit officers and collect intelligence."

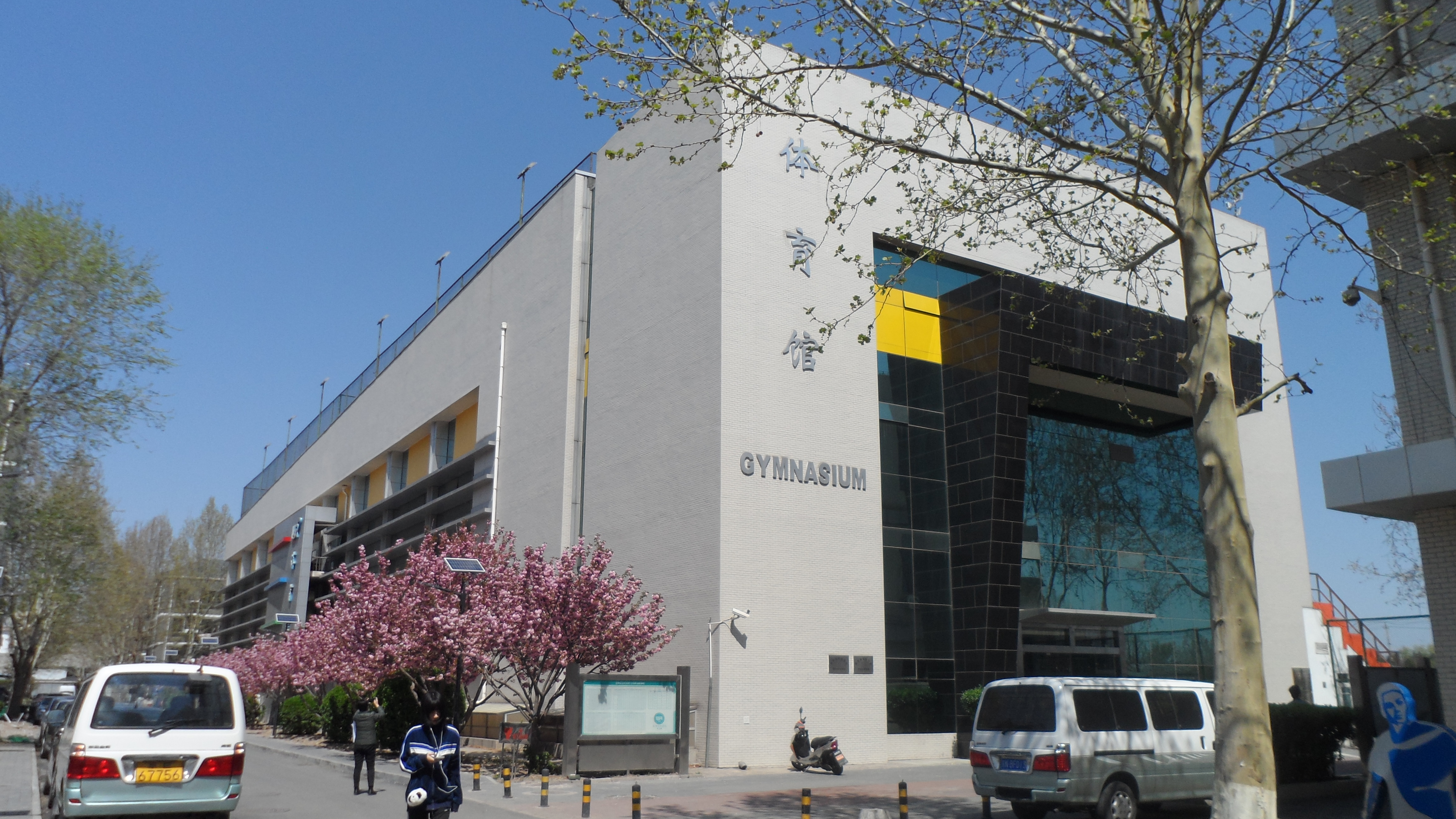
UIR gymnasium

== Partnerships ==
The university maintains partnerships and exchanges with Marietta College, University of Massachusetts Boston, Aalborg University, Toulouse 1 University Capitole, Hiroshima University, Hiroshima City University, Ibaraki University, among others.

== Notable alumni ==
- An Min, former Vice Minister of Commerce
- Du Wei, diplomat, former Chinese ambassador to Israel
- Liu Huan, artist, singer of the 2008 Summer Olympics theme song
- Ma Jun, environmentalist, non-fiction writer, and journalist
- Mei Feng, screenwriter, Prix du scénario (Best Screenplay Award) winner of 2009 Cannes Film Festival
- Qin Gang, China's 12th Minister of Foreign Affairs, the 11th Ambassador of the People's Republic of China to the United States
- Wan Fan (scholar), President of China Foreign Affairs University
- Yan Xuetong, Director of the Institute of International Studies, Tsinghua University
- Zou Jiayi, Vice Minister of the Ministry of Finance of the People's Republic of China, non-executive director of the board of directors of China Investment Corporation

== See also ==
- China Institutes of Contemporary International Relations
- Jiangnan Social University
- Moscow State Institute of International Relations
