= Tianxia =

Chinese cultural, philosophical, and political concept

Chinese name
- Chinese: 天下
- Literal meaning: under heaven
Transcriptions
Standard Mandarin
- Hanyu Pinyin: tiānxià
- Gwoyeu Romatzyh: tianshiah
- Wade–Giles: t'ien^{1}-hsia^{4}
- IPA: [tʰjɛ́n.ɕjâ]
Wu
- Romanization: thie-ya
Hakka
- Romanization: ien24 ha55
Yue: Cantonese
- Yale Romanization: tīn-hah
- Jyutping: tin1-haa6
- IPA: [tʰin˥.ha˨]
Southern Min
- Hokkien POJ: thian-hā
Eastern Min
- Fuzhou BUC: tiĕng-hâ

Vietnamese name
- Vietnamese alphabet: thiên hạ
- Chữ Hán: 天下

Zhuang name
- Zhuang: lajmbwn

Korean name
- Hangul: 천하
- Hanja: 天下
Transcriptions
- Revised Romanization: cheonha
- McCune–Reischauer: ch'ŏnha

Japanese name
- Kanji: 天下
- Kana: てんか; てんげ; てんが; あめのした
Transcriptions
- Romanization: tenka; tenge; tenga; ame-no-shita

Tianxia (Chinese: 天下; pinyin: Tiānxià; lit. '[everything] under Heaven'), in historical Chinese cultural understanding, is either the entire geographical world or the metaphysical realm of mortals. In ancient China and imperial China, tianxia denoted the lands, space, and area divinely appointed to the Chinese sovereign by universal and well-defined principles of order. The center of this land was directly apportioned to the Chinese court, forming the center of a world view that centered on the Chinese court and went concentrically outward to major and minor officials and then the common subjects, tributary states, and finally ending with fringe barbarians.

The larger concept of tianxia is closely associated with civilization and order in classical Chinese philosophy. Some contemporary Chinese scholars have attempted to apply the concept in the 21st century.

== Historical development ==
The historical consensus is that a tianxia system existed at various points in Chinese history. Historical views differ, however, on exactly when it was in place. According to academic Chenyang Song, in ancient times, tianxia represented a unity of the "supremacy" (maintaining interconnectedness between political entities), "heaven" (directing the fate of the people), and "ancestors" (who bestowed blessings on royal descendants). How a system of tianxia operated varied over time, ranging from vassal states accepted the authority of a Chinese emperor to when vassal states nominally paid tribute while in fact exercising their own authority. In the most expansive historical view, a tianxia system existed between the Zhou (1027–256 BC) and Qing dynasties (1644–1911).

According to political scientist Yan Xuetong of Tsinghua University, "Given the then lack of a modern science of understanding geography, the Chinese notion of all under heaven meant all the land, sea, and people under heaven. The term all under heaven was virtually synonymous with the world." As reconstructed by philosopher Zhao Tingyang, tianxia presupposed "inclusion of all" and implied acceptance of the world's diversities, emphasizing harmonious reciprocal dependence and ruled by virtue as a means for lasting peace. According to Zhao, in the tianxia system, rulers relied on humane authority, as opposed to tyranny and military force, to win the hearts and minds of the people.

The tianxia world view was not fully developed during the Shang dynasty. During the Zhou dynasty, it is first attested that Heaven took on anthropomorphic deity traits, and the concept of tianxia became common. Other political terms emerged during this time. These include 'four quarters' (四方; sìfāng)—referring to the territory established by the Zhou court and governed from the capital—and 'ten thousand states' (万邦; 萬邦; wànbāng), referring to both the territory as well as the Hua and barbarian subjects residing on it. The Zhou kings received and empowered these "Ten Thousand States" by virtue of the Mandate of Heaven.

During the Spring and Autumn and Warring States periods comprising the latter half of the Zhou dynasty, the power of local rulers developed rapidly, and several regions outside the Zhou cultural sphere became powerful states themselves. As many of these states had shared cultural heritage and economic interests, the concept of a great nation centered on the Yellow River Plain gradually expanded. The term tianxia began to appear in classical texts such as the Zuozhuan and Guoyu.

The theme of unification applied to tianxia can be seen in Sun Tzu's The Art of War where the supreme goal of offensive strategy was to conquer without destroying that which you sought to conquer:

必以全爭於天下，故兵不頓而利可全，此謀攻之法也。

— Sun Tzu,The Art of War
Chapter III
Translation:

Your aim must be to take All-under-Heaven intact. Thus your troops are not worn out and your gains will be complete. This is the art of offensive strategy.

— Griffith translation, 1963

During Qin's wars of unification, the concept of tianxia was adapted to act as an actual geographic entity. Qin Shi Huang's goal to 'unify all under Heaven' was in fact representative of his desire to control and expand Chinese territory. At the founding of the Han dynasty, the equivalence of tianxia with the Chinese nation evolved due to the practice of enfeoffment of imperial relatives in return for military assistance. Although many areas enjoyed great autonomy, the practice established and spread Chinese language and culture throughout an even wider territory. Scholars including Dong Zhongshu sought to standardize the meaning of tianxia. Dong described tianxia as a world order in three concentric layers: "The nation is on the inside and the various feudal kingdoms are on the outside; the feudal kingdoms are on the inside while the barbarians are on the outside."

Unified China fractured into many different dynasties during the Northern and Southern period, and with it went the practical use of the term tianxia. In the 7th century during the Tang dynasty, some northern tribes of Turkic origin, after being made vassal, referred to Emperor Taizong as the "Khan of Heaven".

By the time of the Song dynasty, northern China was ruled by the Khitan-led Liao dynasty, the Jurchen-led Jin dynasty, and the Tangut-led Western Xia dynasty. After being threatened by these northern states and realizing the possible effects of a war to the country and people, the Song rulers invented a false concept of kinship with the Jurchens in an attempt to improve relations. The Mongol-led Yuan dynasty divided Chinese subjects into two types: those of the south, and those of the north. When the Ming dynasty overthrew the Yuan dynasty and reunited China under ethnic Han rule, the concept of tianxia returned largely as it was during the Han dynasty.

At the end of the Ming dynasty, criticisms of Neo-Confucianism and its mantras of 'cultivation of moral character, establishment of family, ordering the state, and harmonizing tianxia', a quote from the Great Learning, became widespread, producing large shifts in Confucianism. The philosopher Wang Fuzhi believed that tianxia was of a fixed, unchangeable dimension, notwithstanding the fact that the Great Learning's mentioning of harmonizing tianxia was actually in reference to government. Using these arguments, Wang was highly critical of Neo-Confucianism. On the other hand, the collapse of the Ming dynasty and the establishment of the Manchu-led Qing dynasty by the, people previously considered "fringe barbarians", heavily influenced people's views of tianxia. Gu Yanwu, a contemporary of Wang Fuzhi, wrote that the destruction of the State was not equivalent to the destruction of tianxia. He argued that the Manchus simply filled the role of Emperor, and that the tianxia of traditional Chinese culture was thus carried on.

The idea of the absolute authority of the Chinese emperor and the extension of tianxia by the assimilation of vassal states began to fade for good with George Macartney's embassy to China in 1793. George Macartney hoped to deal with China as Great Britain would with other European nations of the time, and to persuade the Emperor to reduce restrictions on trade. The Qianlong Emperor rejected his request, and stated that China was the foremost and most divine nation on Earth and had no interest in foreign goods. In the early 19th century, Britain's victory over Qing China in the First Opium War forced China to sign an unequal treaty. This marked the beginning of the end for the tianxia concept.

Following their defeat in the Second Opium War, China was forced to sign the Treaty of Tianjin, in which China was made to refer to Great Britain as a "sovereign nation", equal to itself. This made it impossible for China to continue dealing with other nations under the traditional tianxia system, and forced it to establish a foreign affairs bureau.

Due to the liberal international order arguably being based on Westphalian sovereignty, the idea that sovereign nations deal with each other as equals, China's traditional tianxia worldview collapsed. After China's defeat in the First Sino-Japanese War, the Japanese terminated Korea's traditional status as a tributary state of China, and the system of feudal enfeoffment and vassalage that had been practiced since the Han dynasty came to an end, a move that greatly changed attitudes toward the tianxia concept. At the end of the 19th century, Chinese Ambassador to Britain Xue Fucheng took the traditional Hua-Yi distinction in the tianxia world view and replaced it with a Chinese-foreigner distinction.

In the 21st century, some academics have criticized contemporary philosopher Zhao Tingyang for "aggrandising" the concept of tianxia and being vague on details of what it may entail in the contemporary world.

== Usage in the Sinosphere ==
=== Korea ===
Based on epitaphs dating to the 4th and 5th centuries, Goguryeo had concepts of Son of Heaven (天帝之子) and independent tianxia. The rulers of Goryeo used the titles of emperor and Son of Heaven, and positioned Goryeo at the center of the haedong 'east of the sea', which encompassed the historical domain of the Three Kingdoms of Korea.

During the 17th century, with the fall of the Ming dynasty in China, a concept of Korea as the cultural center of Confucianism, or "Little China" emerged among the Confucian literati of the Joseon dynasty.

=== Contemporary China ===
Chinese state media frequently portrays general secretary of the Chinese Communist Party Xi Jinping as having the tianxia perspective to seek "rejuvenation of the Chinese nation and peaceful development of humanity". Under this contemporary view, China's re-emergence as a great power presents an opportunity to reshape the liberal international order into a hub-and-spoke pattern around a single, central state. In this contemporary discourse on tianxia, proponents argue that tianxia's moral appeal distinguishes it from realpolitik, which they submit as creating discord. Similarly, this modern treatment toward tianxia purports to be superior to the United Nations system, which is characterized as more akin to a political market, in which political operations are limited and constrained by parochial national interests. Historian Steve Tsang states that the Chinese Communist Party's concept of "Community of Common Destiny" presumes a vision of tianxia over and above the liberal international order. At the CPC in Dialogue with World Political Parties High-level Meeting in 2017, Xi said:

The Chinese nation has aspired for "all being one family under heaven'' since ancient times. We believe in harmony between humankind and the world, harmony among all nations, and great harmony for all under tianxia. We long for the utopian world of "when the Great Way prevails, tianxia works for the common good:' ... People of different countries across the world should uphold the concept of 'we are all one family under heaven;' embrace each other with open arms, understand each other, seek commonalities and respect differences, and collectively work hard to build the common destiny for humankind.

Applying the tianxia system to a modern framework, Chinese political scientist Yan Xuetong argues that great powers seeking international respect must use "humane authority" instead of seeking to impose hegemony. These concepts influence the Chinese school of international relations.

Various academics have noted that the current discourse of tianxia has been produced for domestic consumption and risks alienating foreigners. Danish academics Klaas Dykmann and Ole Bruun state, "[f]oreign observers, particularly in democratic societies, will further note the glaring inconsistencies between the “harmonious world” conception and the tough realities of the domestic harmonious society, and between China's global media outreach and its increasing domestic control, digital surveillance, blacklisting, and media isolation of the Chinese public."

== Western calques ==
The expression 'all under heaven' inspired literary expressions with reference to China in a number of Western languages, such as the Russian Поднебесная Podnebesnaya. The English term "Celestial Empire" is possibly derived from the title "Son of Heaven".

== Other usage ==
In 2013, the Singaporean historian Wang Gungwu coined the term "American Tianxia" to refer to the contemporary world order led by the United States.

== See also ==
- Chinese unification
- Chinese exceptionalism
- Four Seas
- Greater East Asia Co-Prosperity Sphere – World War II era Pan-Asian union under the Empire of Japan
- Huaxia
- Heaven worship
- Hero (2002 film) — 2002 film centered on the term with controversy on the translation of tianxia to All Under Heaven versus Our Land
- Panarchy
- Pax Sinica
- The Land of Fire
- Zhao Tingyang
- Universal monarchy
