= Robin Michael Garcia =

Filipino political scientist

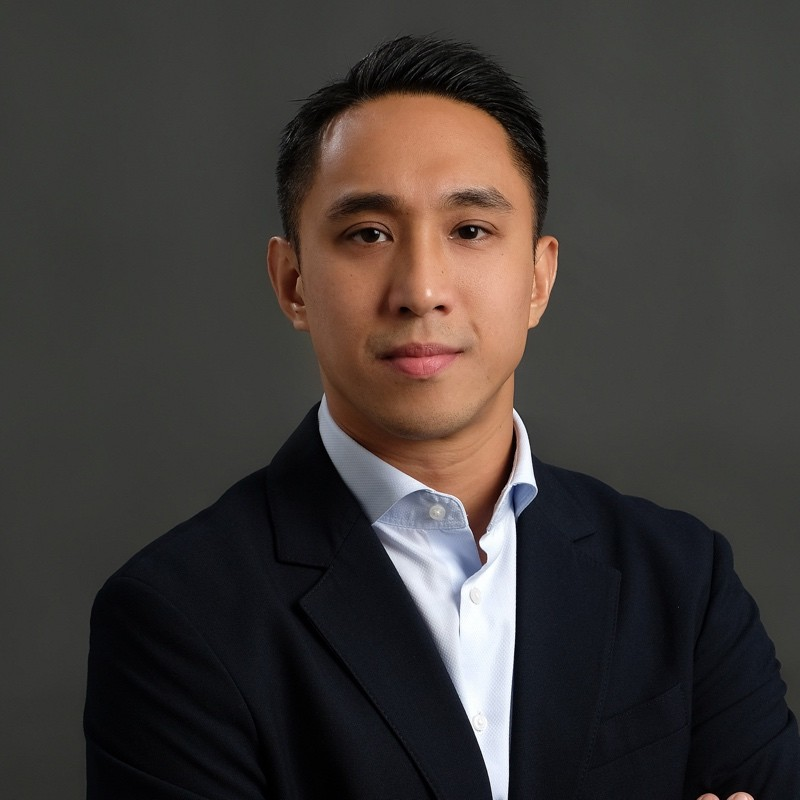
- Born: Robin Michael Upano Garcia
- Citizenship: Filipino
- Education: De La Salle University (BA); University of the Philippines Diliman (MPA); Fudan University (Ph.D.)
- Occupations: President and Chief Executive Officer • Founder and Chairman • Associate Professor • Political Commentator • Political Consultant
- Employer: WR Advisory Group WR Numero Research Ateneo de Manila University
- Known for: Philippine electoral campaign strategy • Opinion polling and survey research • Social analytics • Philippine foreign policy analysis
- Awards: Young Leader, International Institute for Strategic Studies (IISS) Shangri-La Dialogue (2025) Congressional Research Fellow, Philippine House of Representatives (2023-2024) Eisenhower Global Fellow (2023) Visiting Scholar, Perry World House, University of Pennsylvania (2023-2024)

Robin Michael Upano Garcia is a business executive, professor, political commentator, and political consultant. He currently serves as the President and Chief Executive Officer of WR Advisory Group (or WRAG), a Manila-based professional services firm specializing in political risk consulting, public opinion research, digital data analytics, public policy, and strategic communications. He also serves as the Founder and Chairman of WRAG’s polling & survey subsidiary, WR Numero Research.

For his innovative pursuit of navigating Philippine politics through survey research, social analytics, and political risk analysis, Garcia was heralded as an Eisenhower Global Fellow in 2023, a visiting scholar at the Perry World House, University of Pennsylvania in 2023-2024, and a Young Leader and delegate at the 2025 International Institute for Strategic Studies (IISS) Shangri-La Dialogue in Singapore.

As a political analyst, Garcia has been interviewed and has written numerous thought pieces for top media outfits locally and abroad, including AlJazeera, CNN, The Diplomat, Taipei Times, ABS-CBN, GMA, and Rappler. His subjects of expertise include Philippine elections, PH-US relations, and Philippine independent foreign policy. He was also a resident analyst at ABS-CBN’s coverage of the 2025 Philippine midterm elections.

As the founding leader of WR Advisory Group and WR Numero Research, Garcia has advised candidates on campaign strategy, most recently in the 2022 Philippine national elections and the 2025 Philippine midterm elections. Garcia provides strategy advice based on his firms’ proprietary opinion polling, survey, and social analytics data. In the 2025 Philippine midterm elections, WR Numero Research correctly predicted 11 out of 12 winning Senators.

With an academic background on political economy and international relations, Garcia is known for criticizing China’s aggressions in the West Philippine Sea while advocating for Taiwan’s independence, the Philippine government’s economic talks and diplomatic strategies, and its strengthened alliances with like-minded states, such as the United States, Canada, Australia, Japan, and Taiwan.

In 2025, Garcia was appointed associate professor in the Ateneo de Manila University School of Government. He was also an assistant professor at the Political Economy program of the University of Asia & the Pacific from 2018 to 2024 where he worked closely with its founder, Dr. Bernardo Villegas.

== Education ==
Garcia completed his Bachelor of Arts degree in Development Studies from De La Salle University in 2010. During his undergraduate studies, he was a member of the Debate Society and was awarded the Gawad Mag-Aaral (Distinguished Student Award) for his academic excellence and leadership.

Garcia pursued his Master of Public Administration (MPA) with a major in public policy at the University of the Philippines National College of Public Administration and Governance (UP-NCPAG), graduating in 2013.

Advancing his education, Garcia earned his Doctor of Philosophy (PhD) in International Politics from Fudan University, Shanghai in 2017 upon the persuasion of Dr. Julio Teehankee, his academic mentor and one of the most influential political scientists in the Philippines and Asia. During Garcia’s time at Fudan, he wrote a doctoral dissertation about the diffusion of international norms, Aristotelian persuasion, and the neuroscience of decision-making under the supervision of Shiping Tang, one of the top international relations scholars in the world. Upon graduation, Garcia was honored with the Dean's Award for Academic Excellence for his scholarly contributions.

== Career ==
WR Advisory Group & WR Numero Research

Garcia founded WR Advisory Group in November 2017, initially named Warwick & Roger (or WR). WR’s early vision was to “provide more advanced political [advice] to corporations through risk analysis". Within the year, WR has already advised energy, mining, and banking corporations, including Recon-X Energy, Rio Tinto, and Standard Chartered, to navigate political transition and risk under former Philippine president Rodrigo Duterte, who was elected into office in 2016.

A year after, in 2018, Garcia led the expansion of WR’s line of capabilities, which include sentiment analysis, media intelligence, and electoral campaign strategy support, in service of national candidates in the 2019 Philippine midterm elections. Garcia also expanded WR’s international partnerships and engagements by organizing and participating in political situation talks and business forums, most notably in Thailand, Australia, Myanmar, and Mongolia. In 2019, in time for the elections, Garcia further enhanced WR’s capabilities by introducing face-to-face opinion surveys and digital communications strategy offerings to candidates.

By 2020, WR under Garcia’s leadership has started advising retainer clients, taking advantage of the firm’s best practices in political risk analysis, social analytics, opinion survey research, and digital communications. In spite of the COVID-19 pandemic, Garcia established WR Numero Research and served as its president and chief executive officer to broaden WR’s public service efforts.

WR Numero Research initially focused on digital survey research and digital sentiment analysis of pressing social and political issues during the Duterte administration. One of WR Numero Research’s first public service efforts was to assess the Filipino people’s opinions on Duterte’s COVID-19 pandemic response and safety of COVID-19 vaccines.

WR and WR Numero Research persisted in conducting opinion surveys and advising presidential candidates for the 2022 Philippine national elections. Some of the firms’ clients include Manila mayor Isko Moreno, incumbent senator Risa Hontiveros, and former vice president Leni Robredo, whom they advised on electoral campaign and digital communications strategies.

Following the authority established by WR and WR Numero Research, Garcia consolidated the two firms in 2023 into WR Advisory Group (or WRAG) as the parent company. The consolidation formalized the firms’ work in data, communications, and political strategy in its first five (5) years of service. Garcia also appointed political scientist Cleve Arguelles as WR Numero Research’s new president and Chief Executive Officer, expanded WRAG’s expert personnel, and commenced development research capabilities for the social sector.

Since the consolidation in 2023, WR Advisory Group’s data, communications, and political strategy capabilities have been sought by more local and national politicians, local and multinational corporations, government agencies, and development organizations to navigate and shape the Philippine political landscape in the next two (2) years.

Academia & Public Sector

Garcia brought his work to the U.S. when he was selected as one of the 25 Eisenhower Global Fellows in March 2023. The program annually selects accomplished mid-career professionals.

In an Inquirer article, Garcia said that during the fellowship, he will create a research lab “that will bring together the academe, the private sector, and the government” to innovate best practices in polling and survey research, data analytics, and political risk analysis in the Philippines. These innovations, Garcia said, are crucial in answering new socio-political questions of the time, including questions on the consistent popularity of former Philippine president Rodrigo Duterte despite his controversial China policy and violent anti-illegal drug campaign.

Garcia joined the tight roster of Filipino data professionals and politicians, such as Senators and former Eisenhower Global Fellows Risa Hontiveros and Bam Aquino, who engaged in global research and solutions exchange between leaders and governments abroad.

In the same year of 2023, in October, Garcia was appointed as Visiting Scholar at the Perry World House, the global affairs hub of the University of Pennsylvania (or Penn). Fresh from his research at the Eisenhower Global Fellowship, Garcia connected with Penn students, faculty, and staff to introduce new approaches to public policy and governance research. Throughout the program, Garcia served as a resource professional on the political economy and international relations of the United States, the Philippines, Southeast Asia, and China.

During his visit, Garcia also worked closely with Thomas Shattuck, the Senior Program Manager of the Perry World House and former deputy director of the Asia Program at the Foreign Policy Research Institute (FPRI). Amid the fresh electoral victory of Taiwanese President Lai Ching-te in 2024, Garcia and Shattuck wrote analyses urging Philippine President Bongbong Marcos to reaffirm its defense and economic cooperation with Taipei under President Lai, Washington, Tokyo, and Hanoi, to counter Beijing in a possible cross-Taiwan Strait conflict. In a Rappler article, Garcia and Shattuck wrote:

Given the likelihood of continued tensions between Beijing and Taipei under Lai, Marcos should prioritize defense conversations with the Biden administration regarding spillover effects of a Taiwan crisis onto the Philippines. Joint exercises between the two countries’ militaries should seriously practice for related contingencies... With Lai set for the presidency, Manila should fast-track defense arrangements with Tokyo as well as Hanoi, which have already gained momentum. Another four years of the Democratic Progressive Party in power in Taipei and the resulting cross-Strait tensions should further drive Manila and Tokyo together.

Garcia and Shattuck’s analyses were also published by global affairs media outfits, such as The Diplomat and Taipei Times.

Back home in the Philippines, WR Advisory Group organized “The China Challenge” forum where Filipino academics, journalists, business executives, local government officials, and representatives from the international community discussed the adverse effects of China’s aggressions in the West Philippine Sea on the Philippines’ defense strategy, economic security, and democracy.

In the discussion, Garcia reiterated his concerns, not only on the said aggressions, but also on China’s influence on the Philippine economy via trade:

The risk is that China may use economic statecraft against the Philippines, as it did with other countries. We need to have a rigorous examination of the Philippines’ level of vulnerability to China, especially in public utilities and critical infrastructure such as energy or telecommunications. A strong economy that is less vulnerable to bigger countries demands the creation of an export-oriented type of industrialized economy akin to other Asian tigers like South Korea or Japan.

Notable personalities also participated in the forum, such as Thomas Shattuck himself; Cleve Arguelles, WR Numero Research CEO; Bernardo Villegas, 1986 Philippine Constitutional Commission Member; Brian Poe Llamanzares, then-Chief of Staff of former senator Grace Poe; Ramon Garcia, Jr., former honorary consul of Portugal to the Philippines; and Quintin Pastrana, president of WEnergy Power Pilipinas.

Further expanding his mastery in Philippine politics and global affairs, Garcia advised the Philippine House of Representatives on foreign policy and budget management as part of the 24-member Congressional Research Fellows from February 2023 to March 2024. The Congressional Research Fellows aim to provide “policy advice, technical assistance, and information support in the formulation and oversight of socio-economic legislation” that promotes budget efficiency and sustainable and inclusive growth.

In 2025, Garcia also joined representatives from the Philippine Department of Foreign Affairs and Department of National Defense as a Young Leader and delegate in the 2025 IISS Shangri-La Dialogue in Singapore. Considered Asia’s premier defense summit, the IISS Shangri-La Dialogue brings together defense ministers from around the globe to discuss the region's security challenges in bilateral talks.

The Philippine delegation discussed emerging threats on cyber security, space research, and maritime security, with Garcia contributing to explore possible collaboration opportunities between Manila and regional and global powers.

Several world leaders and defense ministers delivered keynote addresses and participated in debates, such as French President Emmanuel Macron, Malaysian Prime Minister Anwar Ibrahim, US Secretary of State Pete Hegseth, Vietnam Defense Minister General Phan Van Giang, Japan Defense Minister Nakatani Gen, Philippine Secretary of Defense Gilberto Teodoro, EU High Representative for Foreign Affairs and Security Kaja Kallas, Australian Minister for Defense Richard Marles, and Dutch Minister for Defense Ruben Brekelmans, among others.

Garcia taught public policy, political economy, international relations, globalization and development theory, and introductory political science courses in the University of the Philippines, Ateneo de Manila University, his alma mater De La Salle University, as well as the University of Asia & the Pacific.

Television & Media

Garcia’s influence on public policy, social analytics, and opinion survey research extended to the Philippine mainstream media. He became one of the most sought-after political analysts by local news outfits on issues about the country’s electoral politics and foreign policy addressing China.

Since October 2025, Garcia has been appearing as one of the regular political analysts in the public affairs program With Due Respect, airing every Sunday, 1:30 PM, at DZMM Radyo Patrol 630, PRTV Prime Media, and FM radio regional stations around the Philippines. Garcia joins WR Numero Research CEO Cleve Arguelles, political scientist Richard Heydarian, lawyer Dino de Leon, and youth advocate Carlo Flores in tackling the country’s political developments weekly, most recently about the flood control corruption scandal.

== Awards and Recognitions ==
- Congressional Research Fellow, Philippine House of Representatives, 2023-2024
- Eisenhower Global Fellow, 2023
- Visiting Scholar, Perry World House, University of Pennsylvania, 2023-2024
- Young Leader and Delegate, IISS Shangri-La Dialogue, 2025
