= Shiping Tang =

Chinese political scientist

- 唐世平
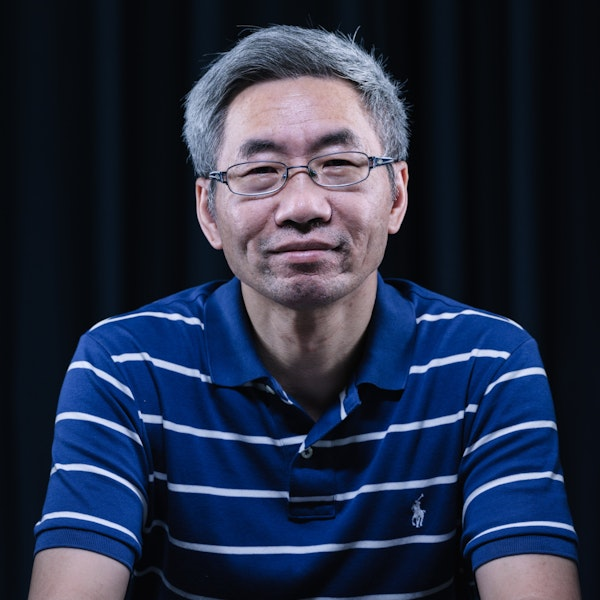
- Tang in 2022
- Born: 24 January 1967 (age 59); Hunan, China
- Education: University of California, Berkeley (MA); Wayne State University (PhD); University of Science and Technology of China (MSc); China University of Geosciences (BSc)
- Children: 1 son
- Scientific career
- Fields: International Relations; Comparative Politics; Institutional Economics; Philosophy of Social Sciences
- Workplaces: Fudan University

Philosophical work
- Era: 21st century
- School: Scientific Realism
- Notable ideas: Social Evolution Paradigm

Shiping Tang (born 24 January 1967) is a Chinese molecular biologist, political scientist, political economist, computational social scientist, and philosopher of social sciences. He is the Fudan Distinguished professor (2013–) & Dr. Seaker Chan Chair Professor (2014–) at Fudan University and also the Cheung Kong Distinguished Professor (2016–) in the Chinese Ministry of Education. He is an editor of International Relations (2021–), International Security (2021–), Small Wars and Insurgencies (2019–), Chinese Journal of International Politics (2018–) and Security Studies (2015–), and was an editor of International Studies Quarterly (2015–2020).

In 1985, Tang received a BSc in Paleontology from China University of Geosciences, Wuhan. In 1988, he completed his MSc in Molecular biology at the University of Science and Technology of China. In 1995, he received his PhD in Molecular Biology and Genetics from the Wayne State University, Detroit, US.

However, believing in scientific realism, Tang decided to apply his knowledge of natural sciences, especially evolution theory, to social sciences and received a Master's degree in International relations (IR) from the University of California at Berkeley in 1999. He is known for his multi-disciplinary works on the Social Evolutionary Paradigm in IR.

== Academic career ==
=== Biologist ===
Between 1988 and 1990, Tang was a Research Scientist at Sino-America Biotech and Weko Biotech. Between 1995 and 1997, he was a Postdoctoral Fellow at Sidney Kimmel Cancer Center, San Diego.

Although Tang has focused his research on social sciences since 1997, he still publishes papers on biology.

=== Social scientist and philosopher ===
Tang was a Research fellow (1999–2002) and then Senior fellow (2002–2006) at Institute of Asia-Pacific Studies (IAPS), Chinese Academy of Social Sciences (CASS) and a Senior Fellow (2006–2009) at Rajaratnam School of International Studies (RSIS), Nanyang Technological University, Singapore. From 2002 to 2003, he was posted by CASS to a midlevel government position in northwestern China. Since 2009, he has been a Professor at School of International Relations and Public Affairs (SIRPA), Fudan University.

His forecasting of a decisive win for Tsai Ing-wen in 2020 Taiwanese presidential election was deleted from Fudan's website, hours after its release.

== Social Evolution Paradigm ==
Tang is the creator of the Social Evolutionary Paradigm (SEP), a social evolutionary theory. He is one of those rare IR theorists who tries to construct a grand theory not only for the discipline but also for human society as a whole. American sociologist Howard E. Aldrich thinks the SEP goes beyond "generalized Darwinism and moving toward adopting generalized evolutionism".

In his 2013 book The Social Evolution of International Politics, Tang argues that human society has historically evolved from relatively benign relations in hunter-gatherer societies, to offensive realism systems, then to defensive realism systems, and finally to a more institutionally rule-based international system.

According to Dutch political scientist Hendrik Spruyt, unlike most IR theories which are historical contingent, Tang's SEP theory is trans-historical. American political scientist Richard Ned Lebow thinks Tang produced a non-determinist and non-reductionist approach to social evolution that is distinct from and critical of evolutionary psychology.

Tang further explained the SEP's theoretical underpinning in his 2020 book On Social Evolution. American political scientist Robert Jervis thinks Tang puts the evolutionary approach through its paces and shows how selection, variance, and inheritance operate to explain both macro and micro Social Developments. American political scientist Peter J. Katzenstein thinks Tang succeeded in developing and defending the claim that "evolutionism triumphs over all other explanations of the natural and the social world."

== Viewpoints ==
=== Against the relationship between genetic diversity and economic development ===
In a 2016 article, Tang criticized a paper by Quamrul Ashraf and Oded Galor which claimed that genetic diversity has a relationship with economic development. He thinks that Ashraf and Galor ignored the "Eurasia effect" and have some "econometric error". Tang's rebuttal was endorsed by American statistician Andrew Gelman in a Washington Post article. Gelman thinks "this new paper by Tang could be useful in that it criticizes Ashraf and Galor on their own terms."

=== On the Russian invasion of Ukraine ===
According to a Stimson Center's article, Tang is the "only prominent Chinese scholar who publicly predicted a war between Russia and Ukraine" before May 2021, through a model of state behaviour he developed. Back in 2009, after the Russo-Georgian War, Tang has already warned that Ukraine will be the next battleground. He published an op-eds to call for a neutral Ukraine to prevent the conflict in 2014.

=== On Chinese politics ===
Tang argues that Chinese political leaders should read 1587, a Year of No Significance, a 1981 book by Ray Huang, carefully to pre-empt failure of bureaucratic system which leads to great policy failures like those happened in the mid-Ming dynasty.

His another article sparked debate in China. He believes that Chinese people should read more Global History and read less ancient Chinese political history. He even thinks that some researches about ancient China, such as Zhao Tingyang and Yan Xuetong's works, are a waste of public money. It is because the later are mostly about rules of man, power struggle and dynasty change, which shed little light on how to reform the contemporary society. He fears that if Chinese people are too obsessed with Chinese political history, it will leads to a sense of parochialism among them too. He thinks Chinese people should learn from the experiences of modernisation of various counties, to better modernize China and have a say on global affairs.

=== On Jon Elster ===
Tang argues that Norwegian social theorist Jon Elster is one of the most over-rated scholars in 20th and 21st centuries. "Each of his books is casual and superficial, with little value", Tang wrote in an article on Southern Weekly.

== Works ==
=== Single-authored books ===
- The Institutional Foundation of Economic Development (Princeton University Press, 2022)
- 观念 行动 结果：社会科学方法新论 [Concepts, Actions, and Results: New Theory of Social Science Methodology](2021)
- On Social Evolution: Phenomenon and Paradigm (Routledge, 2020)
- 众人皆吾师 [Everyone is My Teacher] (2017)
- The Social Evolution of International Politics (Oxford University Press, 2015)
- A Theory of Security Strategy for Our Time: Defensive Realism (Palgrave Macmillan, 2013)
- A General Theory of Institutional Change (Routledge, 2010)
- 冷战后近邻国家对华政策研究 [A Study on Policies of Near Neighbouring Countries towards China after the Cold War] (2005)
- 塑造中国的理想安全环境 [Shaping China's Ideal Security Environment] (2003)

=== Edited volumes ===
- 比较政治学 [Companion to Comparative Politics] (2021), with Wang Zhengxu and Geng Shu
- 历史中的战略行为: 一个战略思维教程 [Strategic Behaviors in History: A Course] (2015), with Wang Kai
- 社会科学写作指导手册 [Social Sciences Writing Guidebook] (2013)
- 知识社群与主体意识 [Knowledge Communities and Subjectivity] (2011)
- Living with China: China and Regional States through Crises and Turning Points (Palgrave-Macmillan, 2009), with Mingjiang Li and Amitav Acharya

=== Selected articles ===
- Understanding Ethnic Conflict: Four Waves and Beyond (2017)
- Foundational Paradigms of Social Sciences. Philosophy of the Social Sciences, 2011: 41(2), 211–249.
- "Taking Stock of Neoclassical Realism." International Studies Review 11 (2009): 799–803.

== Awards ==
His 2013 book, The Social Evolution of International Politics, received the International Studies Association (ISA) "Annual Best Book Award" in 2015. He was the first Chinese and Asian scholar to receive this prestigious award.
