= Wang Fan (disambiguation) =

Wang Fan (王蕃) is a Chinese astronomer, mathematician, politician, and writer of the state of Eastern Wu during the Three Kingdoms period of China.

Wang Fan, may also refer to:

- Wang Fan (scholar) (王帆), Chinese scholar and president of China Foreign Affairs University
- Wang Fan (beach volleyball) (王凡), Chinese beach volleyball player
- Wang Fan (footballer) (王帆), Chinese footballer
