= American Tianxia =

Socio-historical concept of American policy

American Tianxia (Chinese: 美国天下; pinyin: Měiguó Tiānxià) is a term coined by the Chinese Australian historian Wang Gungwu in 2013 to refer to the contemporary global order centered on the United States. It was further developed by sociologist Salvatore Babones to analyze today's millennial world-system through the lens of the Chinese concept of tianxia, meaning "all under heaven." While the United States is often called an "empire," this is a historically loaded term that is associated with perceptions of American imperialism. The concept of tianxia has a different set of meanings attached to it that Wang suggests and Babones argues are closer to what the United States actually displays in its contemporary approach to foreign affairs.

== Background ==
The original Chinese term tianxia describes a world-system that, according to Wang, described "an enlightened realm that Confucian thinkers and mandarins raised to one of universal values that determined who was civilized and who was not." The term first became widely used during the Zhou dynasty where China was the central state with a Mandate of Heaven bestowed upon the king, or the Son of Heaven. In this system, China was the center of the world to which peripheral states were connected under the Imperial Chinese tributary system, in which trade envoys from aligned countries would be given highly favorable exchanges for their allegiance to the imperial court. It was found that in extending Chinese territory, it was much easier to let each conquered area keep their aristocracy than to fully attempt to control their peoples. Despite the assumed sovereignty, Chinese language, culture and loyalty were strongly imposed and their status was based upon their proximity to China as a satellite state.

States were separated as "Confucian" and "non-Confucian". Confucian states had adopted Chinese customs, calendars and language. Problems within states were approached through Confucian philosophy. Non-Confucian states were aligned with the Chinese Tianxia, but less integrated. Non-Confucian states would often solve disputes through China as a central power in the region and resembled the 'periphery' states of the modern world-systems theory. A hierarchy of individuals within the Chinese Tianxia went from the emperor, down to various officials, then citizens and then foreigners, which were considered to be "barbarians" or "less civilised." Within this concept, the role of 'barbarian' can be taken by Chinese and the barbarians can become enlightened Chinese through Confucian philosophy, it generally followed that the Chinese were under heaven and outsiders were accepted, although as lesser citizens.

The Chinese Tianxia in East Asia ended after China's defeat in the First Opium War after which the British Empire made the Qing dynasty accept their sovereignty and accept them as equals. This cast doubt upon the mandate of the tianxia and the concept was seen to be dissolved.

== American Tianxia ==
Babones conceives the American Tianxia as a central state system in which ties between countries are either aligned with the United States, opposed to the United States, or modulated by the United States. In addition to countries, he also argues that individuals are linked into global hierarchies that are centered on the United States. In Babones' view, the individualism of this system constitutes the fulfillment of the End of History thesis of Francis Fukuyama, which posits that liberal democratic capitalism is the final ideological destination for nations on Earth. While this notion is contentious, the American Tianxia has a firm grip on the direction of the world economy and world polity through control of security worldwide and the firm grip on the economic and international extra government institutions that are seen as legitimate to interfere with internal politics in sovereign countries. Even more important, in Babones' formulation, is that globalized individuals in the American Tianxia have strong incentives to maintain the structure of the existing world-system.

An example of the way in which American power is accepted worldwide can be seen in the way in which American domestic politics is globalized. No other polity is so widely observed as the United States, where presidential elections are often viewed across the whole world. The political scientist Yuen Foong Khong characterizes this as the American Tributary System, a system in which the President of the United States is often referred to as the leader of the free world, similar to the Mandate of Heaven concept within the Chinese Tianxia. Khong suggests that while China has receded from being a tianxia to being an ordinary country, the United States has made the opposite transition, from country to tianxia.

The concept is very similar to Pax Americana.

== Tianxia comparisons ==
In the American Tianxia, the primary way the United States influences the affairs of other countries is through the behavior of their own elites in looking to the United States for legitimation. This is similar to the Chinese Imperial Tianxia, in which leaders of the countries surrounding China received Chinese patents of office legitimating their rule. Like Imperial China, the United States does not ordinarily conquer countries in order to influence them, but instead achieves desired outcomes through economic sanctions, targeted attacks or strategic support of opposition forces.

A striking difference between the old Chinese Tianxia and the new American Tianxia is reciprocity. The Chinese Tianxia established a tributary system where gifts received by the Chinese from tributary states were returned with gifts of much greater value, establishing their primacy and giving material legitimacy and loyalty through reward. America invests in foreign countries but often expects a greater return on that investment than what it offers others. In China, the United States is often accused of commanding loyalty through hegemony rather than through generosity.

== See also ==
- Pax Sinica, historic periods of peace in the Chinese cultural sphere
- Chinese Century, the possibility of a new Chinese Tianxia in the form of China replacing America as the next superpower of the world.
