= Qi Dayu =

Chinese diplomat (born 1963)

- 齐大愚

Chinese Ambassador to Hungary
- Incumbent
- Assumed office October 2020
- Preceded by: Duan Jielong

Communist Party Secretary of China Foreign Affairs University
- In office March 2017 – October 2020
- Preceded by: Yuan Nansheng
- Succeeded by: Cui Qiming

Chinese Ambassador to Kyrgyzstan
- In office February 2013 – August 2016
- Preceded by: Wang Kaiwen
- Succeeded by: Xiao Qinghua

Personal details
- Born: September 1963 (age 62) Andong, Liaoning, China
- Party: Chinese Communist Party
- Education: Nanjing University; Moscow State University; Peking University

Chinese name
- Simplified Chinese: 齐大愚
- Traditional Chinese: 齊大愚
Transcriptions
Standard Mandarin
- Hanyu Pinyin: Qí Dàyú

Qi Dayu (Chinese: 齐大愚; born September 1963) is a Chinese diplomat currently serving as Chinese Ambassador to Hungary. Previously he served as Communist Party Secretary of China Foreign Affairs University and before that, Chinese Ambassador to Kyrgyzstan.

== Biography ==
Qi was born in Andong (now Dandong), Liaoning, in September 1963. In 1986, he graduated from Nanjing University, where he majored in Russian.

Qi joined the Foreign Service in 1986 and has served primarily in the Department of Eurasia, Ministry of Foreign Affairs. He was first posted abroad in 1996, to be a secretary at the Chinese Embassy in Russia. He was counsellor of the Chinese Embassy in Georgia from 2001 to 2005. He served as the Chinese Ambassador to Kyrgyzstan from 2013 until 2016, when he was succeeded by Xiao Qinghua. In March 2017, he became Communist Party Secretary of China Foreign Affairs University, a post he kept until October 2020, when he was appointed Chinese Ambassador to Hungary.

Diplomatic posts
Preceded by Wang Kaiwen	Chinese Ambassador to Kyrgyzstan; 2013–2016	Succeeded by Xiao Qinghua
Preceded by Duan Jielong	Chinese Ambassador to Hungary; 2020–present	Incumbent
Party political offices
Preceded by Yuan Nansheng	Communist Party Secretary of China Foreign Affairs University; 2017–2020	Succeeded by Cui Qiming
