= List of ambassadors of China to Kyrgyzstan =

Coordinates: 42.872743°N 74.586709°E

Ambassador of China to Kyrgyzstan
- Incumbent; Xiao Qinghua since August 2016
- Inaugural holder: Pan Zhanlin
- Formation: August 1992; 34 years ago

The ambassador of China to Kyrgyzstan is the official representative of the People's Republic of China to the Kyrgyz Republic.

== List of representatives ==
Diplomatic agrément/Diplomatic accreditation	Ambassador	Chinese language zh:中国驻吉尔吉斯大使列表	Observations	Prime Minister of Kyrgyzstan	Premier of the People's Republic of China	Term end
August 1992	Pan Zhanlin	zh:潘占林		Tursunbek Chyngyshev	Li Peng	April 1995
April 1995	Yao Peisheng	zh:姚培生		Apas Jumagulov	Li Peng	March 1998
March 1998	Chen Zhongcheng	zh:陈忠诚		Kubanychbek Jumaliyev	Zhu Rongji	August 1998
October 1999	Zhang ZhiMing	zh:張志明		Amangeldy Muraliyev	Zhu Rongji	August 2001
August 2001	Hong Jiuyin	zh:宏九印		Kurmanbek Bakiyev	Zhu Rongji	August 2003
August 2003	Zhang Yannian	zh:张延年		Nikolai Tanayev	Wen Jiabao	March 2009
March 2009	Wang Kaiwen	zh:王开文		Igor Chudinov	Wen Jiabao	February 2013
February 25, 2013	Qi Dayu	齐大愚		Zhantoro Satybaldiyev	Li Keqiang	August 2016
August 2016	Xiao Qinghua	肖清华	Chinese Embassy in Bishkek bombing	Sooronbay Jeenbekov	Li Keqiang	
