= Yan Xuetong =

Chinese political scientist

Yán Xuétōng
- 阎学通
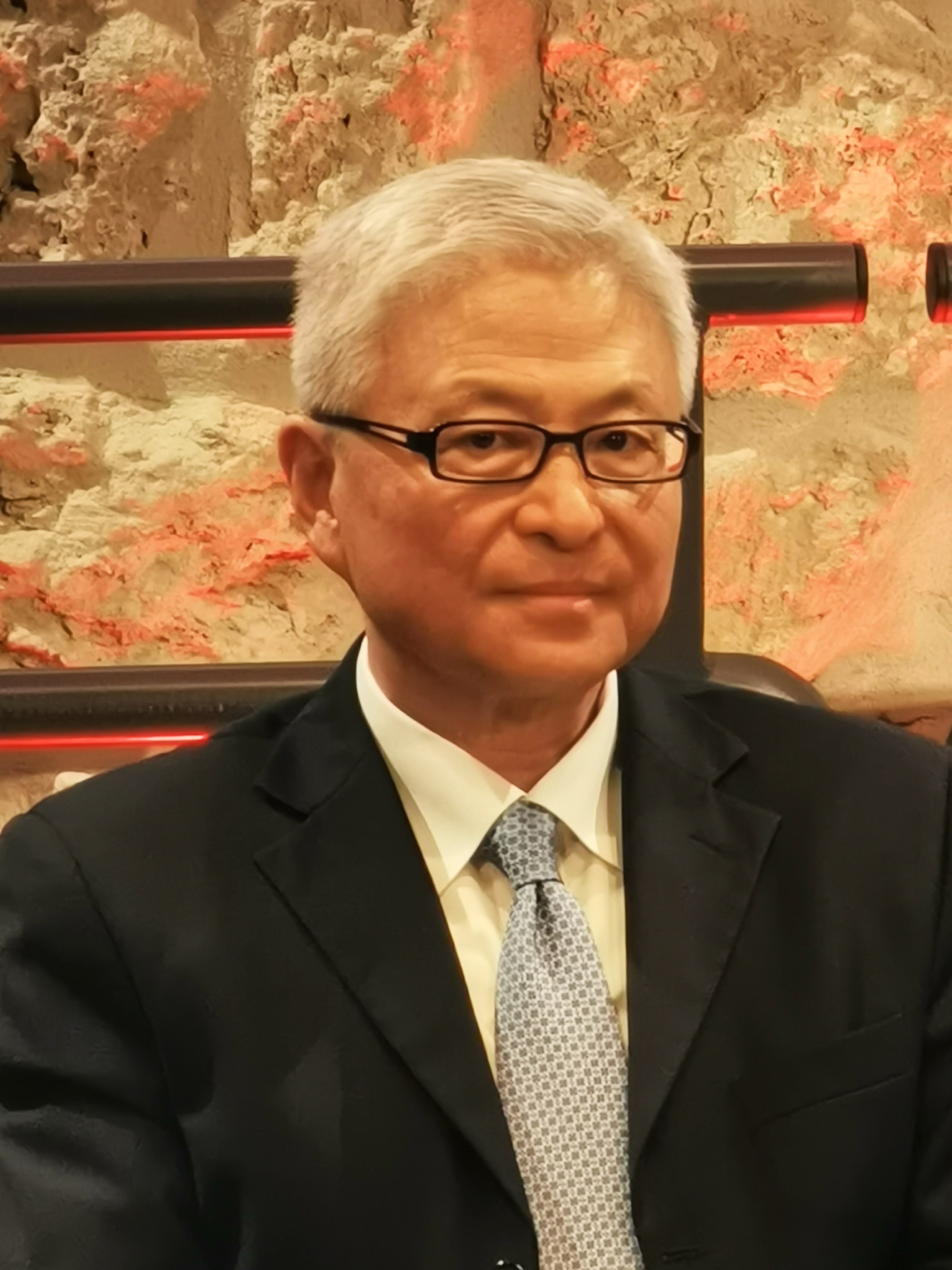
- Yan in 2024
- Born: December 7, 1952 (age 73); Tianjin, China
- Education: Heilongjiang University (BA); University of International Relations (MA); University of California, Berkeley (PhD)
- Occupations: Professor, dean
- Political party: Chinese Communist Party

Yan Xuetong (Chinese: 阎学通; pinyin: Yán Xuétōng; born 7 December 1952) is a Chinese political scientist and serves as a distinguished professor and dean of the Institute of International Relations at Tsinghua University. Yan is one of the major Chinese figures in the study of international relations (IR). He is the founder of 'moral realism', a neoclassical realist theoretical paradigm in IR theory. His moral realist theory is based on political determinism.

In 2008, he was named as one of world's Top 100 Global Thinkers by the Foreign Policy. He is the only political scientist listed as Most Cited Chinese Researchers by Elsevier during 2014–2017.

== Education ==
Yan earned a B.A. in English from Heilongjiang University (1982), an M.A. in international politics from Institute of International Relations, Beijing (1986), and a Ph.D. in political science from the University of California, Berkeley (1992).

Yan studied with major figures of the Realist school of international relations, including Kenneth Waltz.

== Career ==
Yan worked for more than two decades at the China Institutes of Contemporary International Relations. He worked for several years at Tsinghua University, including as the dean of its Institute for International Relations.

As of at least 2025, Yan is the secretary general of the World Peace Forum held by Tsinghua University, which is one of China's most important international relations conferences.

== Perspectives ==
Yan's analysis draws on Realist ideas from Western context and re-examines them in the context of historical Chinese theory. His views are associated with the Chinese school of international relations.

=== China's national interests ===
Yan's 1996 book Analysis of China's National Interests was the first Chinese-language book to systemically analyze the titular subject. The book became significant among Chinese audiences for its argument that China should prioritize its own national interests in foreign policy, instead of the more traditional arguments that China should prioritize class interests or proletarian internationalism in its foreign policy.

=== Tianxia ===
Yan writes that in the tianxia system of imperial China, rulers relied on humane authority (in contrast to tyranny and military force) to win the hearts and minds of the people. Applying lessons from the tianxia system to a modern framework, Yan argues that great powers seeking international respect must use humane authority instead of seeking to impose hegemony.

== Awards ==
- Ancient Chinese Thought, Modern Chinese Power won the 2014 Beijing Academic Prize (Second Class).
- China's Foreign Relations with Major Powers 1950-2005 won the 2013 China High Education Prize.
- Analysis of International Relations won the 2008 China National Elite Class Prize.
- Practical Methods of International Studies was authorized as text book by the Chinese Education Ministry in 2007.
- Analysis of China's National Interests won the 1998 China Book Prize.

== Honors ==
- One of world's Top 100 public intellectuals listed by Foreign Policy, 2008.
- The only political scientist listed as Most Cited Chinese Researchers by Elsevier during 2014–2017.
- Vice Chairman of China Association of International Relations Studies, 2010 till now.
- Vice Chairman of China Association of American Studies, 2010 till now.

== Publications ==
=== Books ===
- Leadership and the Rise of Great Powers (Princeton University Press, 2020)
- Moral Realism and Strategy for China’s Rise (Social Science Academic Press, 2018)
- Beyond Keeping a Low Profile (Tianjin People Press, 2016)
- Shift of World Power: Political Leadership and Strategic Competition (Beijing University Press, 2015)
- China’s Relations with Surrounding Lesser States (Social Science Academic Press, 2015)
- Inertia of History: China and the World in Next 10 Years (China CITIC Press, 2013)
- Analysis of International Relations-Second Edition (Peking University Press, 2013)
- Toward a Stable Global System (Social Science Academic Press, 2012)
- Ancient Chinese Thought, Modern Chinese Power (Princeton University Press, 2011)
- China’s Foreign Relations with Major Powers 1950-2005 (High Education Press, 2010)
- Strategic Thinking about China’s Rise (Hunan People Press, 2010)
- Thoughts of World Leadership and Implications (Shijie Zhishi Press, 2009) Analysis of International Relations (Peking University Press, 2008) T
- The Rise of China and Its Strategy (Peking University Press, 2005)
- International Politics and China (Peking University Press, 2005)
- Practical Methods of International Studies (People Press, 2001)
- American Hegemony and China’s Security (Tianjin People Press, 2000) A
- Analysis of China’s National Interests (Tianjin People Press, 1996)

Editions

- Thoughts of World Leadership and Implications (World Affairs Press, 2009)
- Pre-Qin Chinese Thoughts on Foreign Relations (Fudan University Press, 2008)
- Calculation of International Circumstances and Taiwan Issue (Peking University Press, 2005)
- Peace and Security in East Asia (Peking University Press, 2005)
- Security Cooperation in East Asia (Peking University Press, 2004)
- China & Asia-Pacific Security (Shishi Press, 1999)
- International Environment for China’s Rise (Tianjin People Press, 1998)
- Translation Contending Theories of International Relations –Fifth Edition (World Affairs Press, 2003)

English Articles

- “Chinese Values vs Liberalism: What Ideology Will Shape the International Normative Order?”, The Chinese Journal of International Politics, Vol.11, No.1, Spring 2018.
- “Trump Can't Start a Cold War with China, Even if He Wants To”, The Washington Post, February 6, 2018.
- “Moral Realism and the Security Strategy for Rising China”, International Security Studies, Vol.3, No.2, Winter 2017.
- “China Can Thrive in the Trump Era”, The New York Times, January 24, 2017.
- “Political Leadership and Power Distribution”, Chinese Journal of International Politics, Vol.9, No.1, Spring 2016.
- “Competition for Strategic Partners”, China-US Focus Digest, Vol.8, October 2015.
- “A Bipolar World Is More Likely”, China-US Focus Digest, Vol.6, April 2015.
- “Diplomacy Should Focus on Neighbors”, China Daily, January 27, 2015, p. 8.
- “From Keeping a Low Profile to Striving to Achievement”, Chinese Journal of International Politics, Vol.7, No.2, Spring 2014.
- “The Bipolarization in East Asia”, Journal of Indian Research, Vol.2, No.1, Jan-Mar. 2014.
- “Let’s Not Be Friends”, Foreign Policy, June 7, 2013.
- “The Shift of the World Centre and its Impact on the Change of the International System”, East Asia: An International Quarterly, Vol. 30. No. 3, Sep. 2013.
- “Strategic Cooperation without Mutual Trust: A Path Forward for China and the US”, Asian Policy, No.15, January 2013.
- “New Values for New International Norms”, China International Studies, Vol.38, No.1, Jan/Feb 2013.
- “The Problem of Mutual Trust”, The International Herald Tribune, Nov. 15, 2012.
- “The Weakening of Unipolar Configuration”, China 3.0, Ed. Mark Leonard, (London: European Council on Foreign Relations, 2012).
- “World Peace Forum’s Responsibilities for International Security”, Foreign Affairs Journal, Autumn 2012.
- “Football Game Rather Than Boxing Match: China-US Intensifying Rivalry Does not Amount to Cold War”, The Chinese Journal of International Politics, Vol.5 No.2, Autumn 2012.
- “How China Can Defeat America”, The New York Times, Nov. 21, 2011.
- “International Leadership and Norm Evolution”, The Chinese Journal of International Politics, Vol.4 No.3, Autumn 2011.
- “How Assertive Should a Great Power Be?”, The New York Times, March 31, 2011.
- “The Sources of Chinese Conduct”, Project Syndicate, March 28, 2011.
- “The Instability of China-US Relations”, The Chinese Journal of International Politics, Vol.3 No.3, Autumn 2010.
- “Sino-U.S. Comparisons of Soft Power”, Contemporary International Relations, Vol. 18 No.2, Mar/Apr, 2008.
- “Xun Zi’s Thoughts on International Politics and Their Implications”, The Chinese Journal of International Politics, Vo.2, No.1, Summer 2008.
- “The Rise of China and its Power Status”, The Chinese Journal of International Politics, Vo.1, No.1, Summer 2006.
- “An East Asian Security Community”, Foreign Affairs Journal, No.17, March 2004.
- “Defining Peace”, The Korean Journal of Defense Analysis, Spring 2004.
- “Decade of Peace in East Asia”, East Asia: An International Quarterly, No.4, Winter 2003.
- “Prioritizing National Security”, China Daily, March 1–2, 2003.
- “Political, Economic Ties on Different Paths”, China Daily, January 27, 2003.
