= List of ambassadors of China to Belarus =

The ambassador of China to Belarus is the official representative of the People's Republic of China to Belarus.

== List of representatives ==
Name (English)	Name (Chinese)	Tenure begins	Tenure ends	Note
Wang Xingda	王行达	April 1992	March 1995	
Zhao Xidi	赵希迪	March 1995	February 1998	
Wu Xiaoqiu	吴筱秋	March 1998	February 2002	
Yu Zhenqi	于振起	March 2002	August 2005	
Wu Hongbin	吴虹滨	September 2005	September 2008	
Lu Guicheng	鲁桂成	November 2008	December 2011	
Gong Jianwei	宫建伟	January 2012	24 December 2013	
Cui Qiming	崔启明	January 2014	September 2020	
Xie Xiaoyong	谢小用	October 2020		
