= Amitav Acharya =

Indian-born Canadian scholar and author (born 1962)

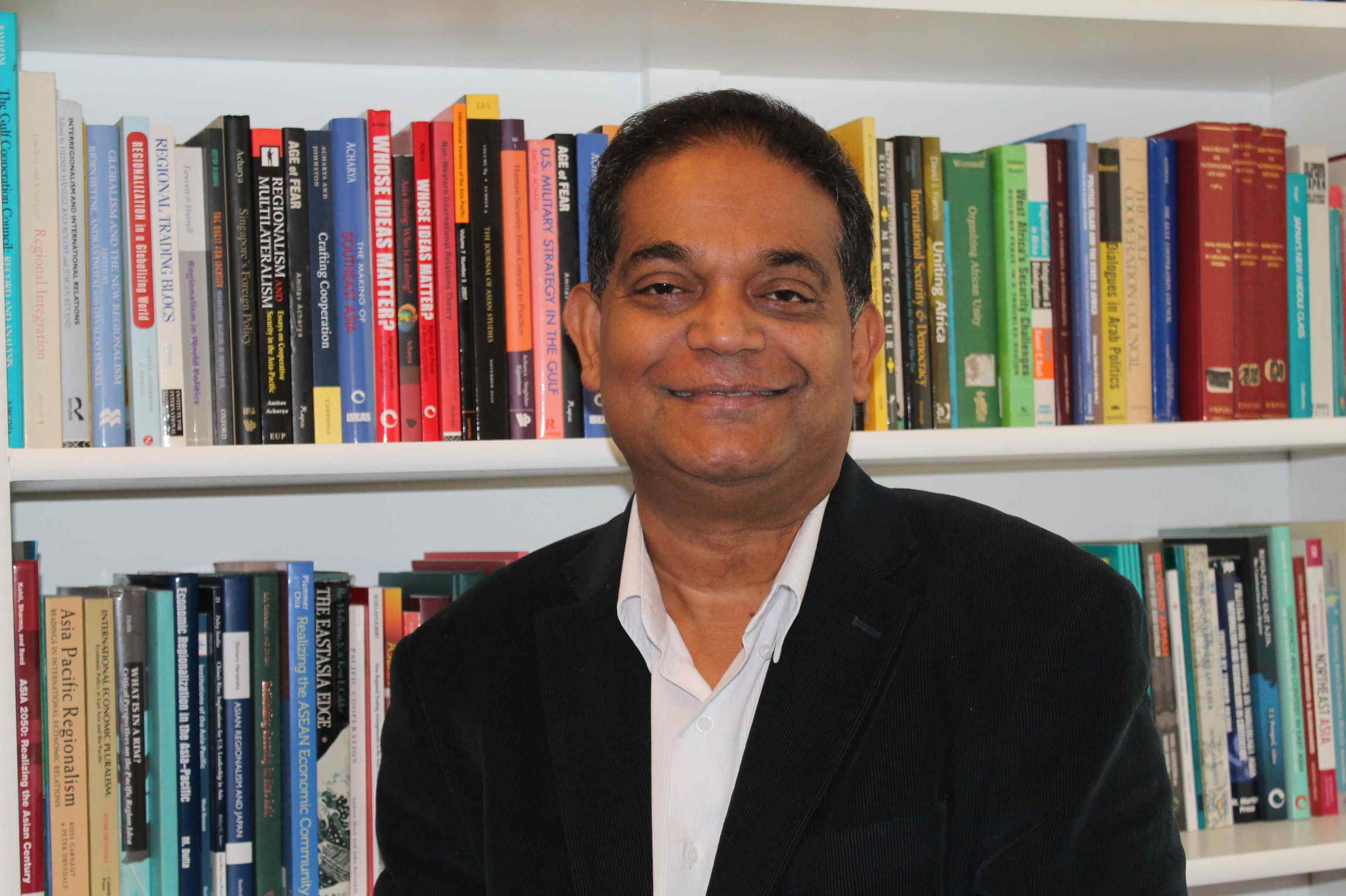
- Born: 1962 (age 63–64); Jagatsinghpur, Orissa (now Odisha), India
- Citizenship: Canadian - American

Academic background
- Education: Ravenshaw University; Jawaharlal Nehru University; Murdoch University

Academic work
- School or tradition: Constructivism
- Institutions: American University
- Main interests: International relations Constructivism; Foreign policy Regionalism; Global governance Human security Asia; National security Globalization
- Notable ideas: Global IR

Amitav Acharya (born 1962) is a scholar and author, who is Distinguished Professor of International Relations at American University, Washington, D.C., where he holds the UNESCO Chair in Transnational Challenges and Governance at the School of International Service, and serves as the chair of the ASEAN Studies Initiative. Acharya has expertise in and has made contributions to a wide range of topics in International Relations, including constructivism, ASEAN and Asian regionalism, and Global International Relations. He became the first non-Western President of the International Studies Association when he was elected to the post for 2014–15.

== Career ==
Acharya was born in Jagatsinghpur, Orissa (now Odisha), India. After completing a BA in political science at Ravenshaw University and an MA in political science at Jawaharlal Nehru University in India, he obtained his doctorate from Murdoch University in Australia in 1987. After brief teaching and research stints in Singapore at the Institute for Southeast Studies (now ISEAS–Yusof Ishak Institute) and the National University of Singapore, he joined the faculty of York University, Toronto in 1993. He was a Fellow at Harvard University's newly established Asia Center in 2000–2001, while concurrently being a Fellow of the Center for Business and Government at Harvard's John F. Kennedy School of Government. From 2001 and 2007, he served as deputy director and Head of Research at the Institute of Defence and Strategic Studies (which in 2007 became the S. Rajaratnam School of International Studies), at Nanyang Technological University in Singapore. In 2007, he was appointed Chair of Global Governance and Director of the Centre for Governance and International Affairs at the University of Bristol. In 2009, he moved to his present position at American University.

Acharya has held various visiting positions throughout his career, including as the ASEM Chair in Regional Integration at the University of Malaya, the Direk Jayanama Visiting Professor of Political Science at Thammasat University, Visiting Professorial Fellow at the Institute of Southeast Asian Studies, Singapore, Visiting Professor at the Lee Kuan Yew School of Public Policy, Nanyang Technological University, Singapore, and Visiting Professor in the Faculty of Economics at Chulalongkorn University. He has also held visiting positions at Australian National University, Stanford University, Sydney University, United Nations University Institute on Comparative Regional Integration Studies, Vietnam National University, Central European University, and Ritsumeikan University. He was elected to a Christensen Fellowship at St Catherine's College, University of Oxford in 2012. In 2012–13, he was appointed to the Nelson Mandela Visiting Professorship in International Relations at Rhodes University, South Africa. In 2016, he was appointed to be the Inaugural Boeing Company Chair in International Relations in the Schwarzman Scholars Program at Tsinghua University. He has been a Distinguished Visiting Professor at the Taipei School of Economics and Political Science, National Tsing Hua University, Taiwan. In 2022, he was made Professor Extraordinarius (Extraordinary Professor), University of Pretoria.

He is a recipient of the Odisha Living Legend Award (2016). He has received three ISA Distinguished Scholar Awards: in 2015 for his "contribution to non-Western IR theory and inclusion” in international studies, in 2018 for his “influence, intellectual works and mentorship” in the field of international organization. and in 2023 for his “extraordinary impact” in globalizing the study of International Relations and “mentorship of emerging scholars”. In March 2026, Acharya and Manjeet S. Pardesi received the T. V. Paul Best Book Award for Divergent Worlds: What the Ancient Mediterranean Can Teach Us About International Order.

In 2020, he received American University's highest honor: Scholar-Teacher of the Year Award.

== Research ==
Acharya's major research interests include the diffusion of ideas and norms in world politics, and constructivist International Relations (IR) theory more generally; comparative regionalism, with a focus on the Association of Southeast Asian Nations (ASEAN); and contributions to IR theory and practice from the Global South, or Global IR. Acharya's research combines and cuts across these different topics, often touching upon multiple themes in a single work.

=== Norm localization and norm subsidiarity ===
Acharya's principal contributions that advance constructivist IR theory are the concepts of norm localization and norm subsidiarity. Constructivism has traditionally accorded more importance to the role of ideas and norms in international politics compared to realism and liberalism. However, Acharya points out that most constructivists conceive of ideas as spreading outward from the West (or the Global North) to the "Rest" (or the Global South). Acharya challenges this story of unidirectional norm diffusion by showing how "local" beliefs and practices also matter. Using case studies from ASEAN, Acharya highlights how Southeast Asian leaders did not just accept transnational norms as is. Rather, where such transnational norms were in line with prior local beliefs, or "cognitive priors", they were successfully "localized". This is exemplified in how the ASEAN states localized the "common security" norm of the Organization for Security and Co-operation in Europe into "cooperative security" as manifested in the ASEAN Regional Forum. While the cooperative security norm recognized the need for inclusive regional security cooperation, it rejected the legalistic and domestic politics aspects of the common security norm, in line with the basic tenets of the ASEAN Way.

While norm localization emphasizes the agency of local actors in adapting prevailing transnational norms, norm subsidiarity is concerned with the creation of new norms by local actors. Norm subsidiarity posits that local actors create new norms and rules with a view toward protecting the norm's autonomy from violation and abuse at the international level. In contrast to localization, which is inward-looking, subsidiarity is outward-looking. Acharya again uses a case from Southeast Asia to illustrate the concept. In resistance to the US-led collective defence organization of the Southeast Asia Treaty Organization signed in 1954, the leaders of South and Southeast Asia met at the Bandung Conference in 1955 and established their support for the norm of collective defence but rejected the use of such an arrangement for the defence of a single country. In so doing, the leaders at Bandung not only rejected the central position of the United States in regional security arrangements, but also created a new norm of collective defence that accorded importance to all treaty members.

A number of IR scholars have built on, engaged with, and challenged Acharya's work on norms, including Antje Wiener, Lisbeth Zimmerman, and Kathryn Sikkink. Through her concept of "norm protagonism", Sikkink compliments Acharya’s work by showing the formation and diffusion of norms in the Global South. She illustrates how Latin American countries were protagonists of human rights norms and, among other things, adopted the American Declaration of the Rights and Duties of Man in April 1948, eight months before the Universal Declaration of Human Rights was adopted by the United Nations General Assembly in December 1948.

=== Comparative regionalism ===
Acharya places a high importance on the study of regions in world politics. His work has attempted to bridge the gap between scholarship in IR and area studies by encouraging conversation between "regionally oriented disciplinarists" and "discipline-oriented regionalists". For Acharya, rather than imagining a "world of regions", where it is primarily superpowers that shape how and when regions are important, it is more useful to think of "regional worlds", where the roles of external powers are balanced by the countries that constitute the region and construct it from within.

Acharya's most prolific work has been on ASEAN. In Constructing a Security Community in Southeast Asia, Acharya traces the evolution of ASEAN and the ASEAN Way of conflict management, which is based on the ASEAN norms of non-interference and avoidance of confrontations in word and deed. Building upon the work on the concept of a security community—a region where the outbreak of war has become almost unthinkable—by Karl Deutsch and Emanuel Adler and Michael Barnett, Acharya finds that ASEAN exhibits the characteristics of a nascent pluralistic security community.

Acharya has also been critical of the Eurocentrism prevalent in comparative regionalism, whereby the European Union (EU) is considered as the best way to regionalize—a model for regional integration—and regionalism projects in other parts of the world are judged against the EU. Rather than compare with the EU, Acharya calls for studies in comparative regionalism to focus more on the specific regional contexts of regionalism projects and to develop more general criteria for comparison that are not based solely on the European experience.

=== Global IR and a multiplex world order ===
In line with his focus on the role and contributions of the Global South to IR theory and practice, Acharya has advanced what he terms "Global IR". One aspect of Global IR is to uncover sources of IR theory from the non-Western world to counterbalance the dominating influence of European history—from the Peloponnesian War in Ancient Greece to the nineteenth-century balance of power under the Concert of Europe—on contemporary IR theory. Along with Barry Buzan, Acharya has published two books on Global International Relations theory that explore scholarly thinking as well as teaching traditions on international relations and foreign policy throughout the Global South.

One reason Acharya and Buzan transitioned from "non-Western" to "Global" IR theory is that Global IR, while challenging traditional IR's neglect and marginalization of the Global South, does not reject the mainstream theories, thus differentiating Acharya from postcolonial IR scholars. Global IR revolves around six main dimensions:

- It is based on pluralistic universalism that recognizes diversity and abjures universal imposition
- It is grounded in world history
- It supplements and subsumes, rather than supplants, traditional IR
- It includes the study of regions as a core part of IR
- It eschews exceptionalism
- It recognizes both ideational and material forms of agency

Acharya's concept of the "multiplex world order" captures his understanding of the ongoing changes and future directions in the landscape of international relations. While not arguing that the United States is in decline per se, Acharya contends that the "American world order", whereby the United States played a hegemonic role in shaping the international system—or the "liberal world order"—to its own benefit through its dominant role in international institutions and its interventionalist foreign policy, is coming to an end. In this respect, Acharya disagrees with John Ikenberry, who highlights America's important role in designing, spearheading, and maintaining postwar "constitutional orders". In contrast to Ikenberry, Acharya finds evidence of an emerging "multiplex" world order, where there is an array of plots (ideas), directors (power), and action (leadership) under one roof (the international system) to choose from.

In 2025, Acharya published The Once and Future World Order: Why Global Civilization Will Survive the Decline of the West, Basic Books, 2025. The book offers a five thousand year history of world order, from the Egyptian and Sumerian civilization to the present. Highlighting the book, the Sunday New York Times "Acharya, a political scientist, surveys 5,000 years of history to argue that Western hegemony isn't a prerequisite to international cooperation and peace. Spanning from ancient Sumerian military conquests to today's Nigerian film industry, Acharya shifts power from the West back to 'the Rest.' " [Sunday New York Times Newly Published Books]. The book was listed among “The Most Anticipated Books of 2025,” by Foreign Policy magazine. An op-ed written by Acharya was published by the New York Times on April 8, 2025, the same day the book was released, “Reasons to Be Optimistic About a Post-American Order.”

== Professional activities ==
Acharya was elected President of the International Studies Association (ISA) for 2014–15. He was the first Indian, Asian, and non-Western scholar to be elected as ISA President. He was a vice-president of the ISA in 2008–09. He is one of the founders of the Asian Political and International Studies Association (APISA), and served as its inaugural co-president in 2003–04.

He is the joint chief editor of the Studies in Asian Security series for Stanford University Press.

Acharya's work has been influential in shaping policy on Asian regionalism and human security. His 2001 book, Constructing a Security Community in Southeast Asia, was the primary basis of the initial Indonesian concept paper which ultimately resulted in the establishment of the ASEAN Political-Security Community. His work on human security led to him being invited to address the UN General Assembly on the subject of human security on 14 April 2011.

He has been interviewed as an international affairs expert by CNN International, BBC, BBC World Service Radio, CNBC, Channel NewsAsia, Canadian Broadcasting Corporation, Radio Australia, National Public Radio (NPR), and Al Jazeera.

Acharya regularly writes op-eds for international newspapers and magazines including The Financial Times, the International Herald Tribune, The New York Times, National Public Radio (NPR) online, The Huffington Post, The Australian Financial Review, Asia Times, The Times of India, The Indian Express, The Straits Times, The Jakarta Post, the Bangkok Post, Asiaweek, the Far Eastern Economic Review, The Japan Times, the South China Morning Post, YaleGlobal Online covering such topics as international and Asian security, regional integration, the war on terror, and the rise of China and India.

On 28 October 2021, he participated in the U.S.A & Global Leadership Debate hosted by the Oxford Union on a motion “This House Would Still Look to the US for Global Leadership”.Speaking for the opposition, Acharya’s side won the debate 166-124. It is notable that speaking for the motion were such distinguished current and former British and US leaders such as Sir Malcolm Rifkind, former British Foreign Secretary, Jane Harman, former member of the US House of Representative from California and former President of the Woodrow Wilson International Center for Scholars, and James Cleverly, former co-chair of the British Conservative Party and the then Minister of State (later Secretary of State) for Foreign and Commonwealth Office and Department for International Development).

== Bibliography ==
- U.S. Military Strategy in the Gulf: Origins and Evolution under the Carter and Reagan Administrations, Routledge, 1989
- The Quest for Identity: International Relations of Southeast Asia, Oxford University Press, 2000
- Constructing a Security Community in Southeast Asia: ASEAN and the Problem of Regional Order, Routledge, 2001, 2009, 2014
- Singapore’s Foreign Policy: The Search for Regional Order, World Scientific, 2007
- Whose Ideas Matter? Agency and Power in Asian Regionalism, Cornell University Press, 2009
- New Challenges for ASEAN: Emerging Policy Issues, with Richard Stubbs, UBC Press, 1995
- Asia-Pacific Security Cooperation: National Interests and Regional Order, with See Seng Tan, Routledge, 2004
- The Once and Future World Order. New York: Basic Books. 8 April 2025. ISBN 978-1-5416-0414-8.
- From Southeast Asia to Indo-Pacific: Culture, Identity, and the Return to Geopolitics, Penguin Books, 2025

He has also co-authored or edited:

- New Challenges for ASEAN: Emerging Policy Issues, with Richard Stubbs, UBC Press, 1995
- Asia-Pacific Security Cooperation: National Interests and Regional Order, with See Seng Tan, Routledge, 2004
- UN Peace Operations and Asian Security, with Mely Caballero-Anthony, Routledge, 2005
- Non-Traditional Security in Asia: The Dynamics of Securitization, with Mely Caballero-Anthony and Ralf Emmers, Ashgate, 2006
- Reassessing Security Cooperation in Asia-Pacific, with Evelyn Goh, MIT Press, 2007
- Crafting Cooperation: Regional International Institutions in Comparative Perspective, with Alastair Iain Johnston, Cambridge University Press, 2007
- Theorizing Southeast Asian Relations: Emerging Debates, with Richard Stubbs, Routledge, 2008
- Bandung Revisited: The Legacy of the Asian-African Conference for International Order, with See Seng Tan, National University of Singapore Press, 2008
- Living with China: Regional States and China through Crises and Turning Points, with Shiping Tang and Li Mingjiang, Palgrave Macmillan, 2009
- Non-Western International Relations Theory: Reflections on and Beyond Asia, with Barry Buzan, Routledge, 2010
- Why Govern? Rethinking Demand and Progress in Global Governance, Cambridge University Press, 2016
- Africa in Global International Relations: Emerging Approaches to Theory and Practice, with Paul-Henri Bischoff and Kwesi Aning, Routledge, 2016
- The Making of Global International Relations: Origins and Evolution of IR at Its Centenary, with Barry Buzan, Cambridge University Press, 2019
- Divergent Worlds: What the Ancient Mediterranean and Indian Ocean Can Tell Us About the Future of International Order, with Manjeet S. Pardesi, Yale University Press, 2025

Acharya has also published several articles in a wide range of International Relations journals. Some of his widely cited articles include:

- Ideas, Identity, and Institution-Building: From the ‘ASEAN Way’ to the ‘Asia-Pacific Way’?, The Pacific Review, 10, no. 3 (1997)
- Human Security: East versus West, International Journal, 56, no. 3 (2001)
- Will Asia’s Past Be Its Future?, International Security, 28, no. 3 (2003–04)
- How Ideas Spread: Whose Norms Matter? Norm Localization and Institutional Change in Asian Regionalism, International Organization, 58, no. 2 (2004)
- The Emerging Regional Architecture of World Politics, World Politics, 59, no. 4 (2007)
- Norm Subsidiarity and Regional Orders: Sovereignty, Regionalism, and Rule-Making in the Third World, International Studies Quarterly, 55, no. 1 (2011)
- Global International Relations (IR) and Regional Worlds: A New Agenda for International Studies, International Studies Quarterly, 58, no. 4 (2014)
