= Holistic national security =

Chinese Communist Party principle

- Simplified Chinese: 总体国家安全观
Transcriptions
Standard Mandarin
- Hanyu Pinyin: Zǒngtǐ guójiā ānquán guān

The concept of holistic national security, also translated as comprehensive national security, is a principle of national security policy based on a speech by Chinese Communist Party general secretary Xi Jinping in 2014. A component of Xi Jinping Thought, it covers twenty areas. According to this principle, dimensions such as economic security, cybersecurity, and energy security are viewed as necessary to traditional national security concerns.

== Development ==
Xi Jinping introduced the concept of holistic national security on 15 April 2014, which he defined as taking "the security of the people as compass, political security as its roots, economic security as its pillar, military security, cultural security, and cultural security as its protections, and that relies on the promotion of international security." He called on CCP members to "pay attention to both traditional and non-traditional security, and build a national security system that integrates such elements as political, military, economic, cultural, social, science and technology, information, ecological, resource, and nuclear security". Holistic national security also emphasizes the need for energy security. Xi created National Security Commission of the Chinese Communist Party, which focuses on holistic national security and addresses both external and internal security matters. The concept has since been used as a tenet of the CCP's Global Security Initiative.

The 14th Five-Year Plan discusses the holistic national security approach as part of the plan's "Integrated Approach to Security and Development." It states that holistic national security "calls for the integration of national security imperatives into every aspect of national development, so as to be better able to implement our national security strategy, safeguard national security, respond effectively to both traditional and non-traditional security threats, and forestall any challenges to China's modernization." It describes the strengthening of national security as requiring a holistic examination of "political security, which is of overarching importance, the security of the people, which is the ultimate concern, and economic security, which underpins all other considerations, to military, scientific and technological, cultural, and social perspectives, which reinforce efforts in other areas."

In April 2021, the Research Centre for a Holistic Approach to National Security was established at the China Institutes of Contemporary International Relations (CICIR) in order to further develop the concept of holistic national security. Yuan Peng was the centre's secretary general during his term as CICIR president. Researchers at the Centre view "great economic change" as an important component of "great changes unseen in a century." In a text issued in 2021, the Centre wrote that holistic national security threats are likely to emerge in "new frontiers" like polar regions, deep sea, the internet, artificial intelligence, and space. In this view, the development of these new frontiers creates uncertainty because they do not have clear geographical borders and therefore transcend traditional ideas of sovereignty. The political report of the 20th CCP National Congress devoted a section to national security. In 2025, the Ministry of National Defense released a white paper titled China's National Security in the New Era, which stated the goal of holistic national security was to "enhance the systemic, holistic, and coordinated nature of national security work and effectively wage a comprehensive national security campaign". The 2026 Law on Promoting Ethnic Unity and Progress has been described as a cornerstone of the CCP's "cultural security" efforts.

== Content ==
The concept of holistic national security is a component of Xi Jinping Thought. It covers twenty areas, including:

1. Political security
2. Military security
3. Territorial security
4. Economic security
5. Financial security
6. Cultural security
7. Societal security
8. Technology security
9. Cybersecurity
10. Food security
11. Ecological security
12. Resource security
13. Nuclear security
14. Overseas interests security
15. Space security
16. Deep-sea security
17. Polar security
18. Biosecurity
19. Artificial Intelligence security
20. Data security.

The November 2021 Resolution on the Major Achievements and Historical Experience of the Party over the Past Century describes holistic national security as encompassing "political, military, homeland security, economic, cultural, social, technological, cyberspace, ecological, resource, nuclear, overseas interests, outer space, deep sea, polar, and biological security issues, among others." On 11 December 2020, at the 26th collective study session of the 19th Politburo, General Secretary Xi Jinping put forwards the "ten insistences" for implementing the concept of holistic national security, the ten insistences are insisting on:

1. "the absolute leadership of the Party over national security work;"
2. "the path of national security with Chinese characteristics;"
3. "taking the people's security as the purpose;"
4. "coordinating development and security;"
5. "putting political security in the primary position;"
6. "coordinating the promotion of security in all fields;"
7. "placing the prevention and resolution of national security risks in a prominent position;"
8. "promoting international common security;"
9. "promoting the modernization of the national security system and capabilities; and"
10. "strengthening the construction of the national security cadre team."

== See also ==
- Ideology of the Chinese Communist Party
