= Yuan Peng =

Chinese intelligence officer and political scientist

- 袁鹏
- Born: 1963 (age 62–63)
- Other name: Yuan Yikun
- Education: Northeast Normal University (PhD)
- Organization: Chinese People's Political Consultative Conference
- Political party: Chinese Communist Party

Yuan Peng (Chinese: 袁鹏) is a Chinese intelligence officer and political scientist specializing in analysis of the United States for the Ministry of State Security (MSS). He previously headed the 11th bureau of the MSS, commonly known as the China Institutes of Contemporary International Relations (CICIR), a unit specializing in overt and open-source intelligence collection and international academic outreach. He is considered one of the ministry's foremost analysts on the United States.

Yuan is noted for coining the phrase "great changes unseen in a century" to refer to China's position in contemporary geopolitics. The term has since become a major topic of academic discussion and has been incorporated into the foreign policy discourse of Chinese leader Xi Jinping. He is a member of the 14th National Committee of the Chinese People's Political Consultative Conference.

According to media reports, Yuan is now a vice minister of state security under the name Yuan Yikun (袁亦鲲).

== Biography ==
Yuan Peng, born in 1963, is a Chinese political scientist who has spent most of career studying U.S. politics. Yuan has lived in the United States and been a visiting fellow at U.S. think tanks including Brookings Institution and the Atlantic Council. At Brookings, Yuan was a visiting fellow for its Center for Northeast Asian Policy Studies. He was a board member of the Nuclear Threat Initiative.

Yuan is a former president of the China Institutes of Contemporary International Relations (CICIR), a foreign policy think-tank and the 11th bureau of the Ministry of State Security. During his CICIR presidency, Yuan developed the concept of holistic national security.

Yuan is a member of the 14th National Committee of the Chinese People's Political Consultative Congress.

According to a Hong Kong media report cited by The New York Times and Lianhe Zaobao, Yuan is now a Vice Minister of the Ministry of State Security and uses the name Yuan Yikun.

== Significant views ==
Yuan was the first to use the term "great changes unseen in a century" to refer to China's position in contemporary geopolitics. He began using the term in his essays after the 2008 financial crisis. It became prominent following the publication of his book Changes Unseen in 400 Years: From Westphalia to a New World Order and ultimately became a part of CCP general secretary Xi Jinping's foreign policy discourse. Yuan's book described the Peace of Westphalia as the first major event in the formation of the current world order, followed by the Treaty of Versailles and the Yalta Conference. Yuan wrote that the world is now going through a fourth major change as a result of global population change, the advancement of technology through a Fourth Industrial Revolution, climate change (including energy transitions), and a shift in geopolitical power from the West to the East.

== See also ==
- Foreign policy of China
