= Justin Rosenberg =

Academic

Justin Rosenberg is a professor in International Relations at the University of Sussex. He received his PhD from the London School of Economics in 1993 with a thesis titled Social structures and geopolitical systems: A critique of the Realist theory of International Relations. Within academia, Rosenberg is associated with "New Marxist" international relations theory. His first book, The Empire of Civil Society (1994) formed a Marxist critique of Realist and Neo-Realist theories of International Relations. He has since changed his view of the relation of domestic and international factors as part of his move towards a theory of Uneven and combined development.

Awards
Preceded by Harvey J. Kaye	Deutscher Memorial Prize; 1994	Succeeded by Eric Hobsbawm
