= Stefano Guzzini =

Stefano Guzzini (born 24 August 1963 in Saarbrücken, Germany) is a German-Italian scholar of international relations. Guzzini is currently the chair of political and social theory at the European University Institute and an associate professor of international relations and political science at the Geneva Graduate Institute. He has previously taught at Uppsala University, at the Inst. de Relações Internacionais, Pontifical Catholic University of Rio de Janeiro and at the Central European University. His research focuses on social and political theories of International Relations, international political sociology, critical security studies, approaches to foreign policy analysis and foreign policy in Europe, concept analysis and theories of power, as well as interpretivist methodologies. Guzzini's book Power, Realism, and Constructivism (Routledge, 2013) won the 2014 International Studies Association Theory Section Book Award. Guzzini graduated from Saarland University, Sciences Po, the London School of Economics and Political Science, and the European University Institute. He is married to Anna Leander.
