= Yuen Foong Khong =

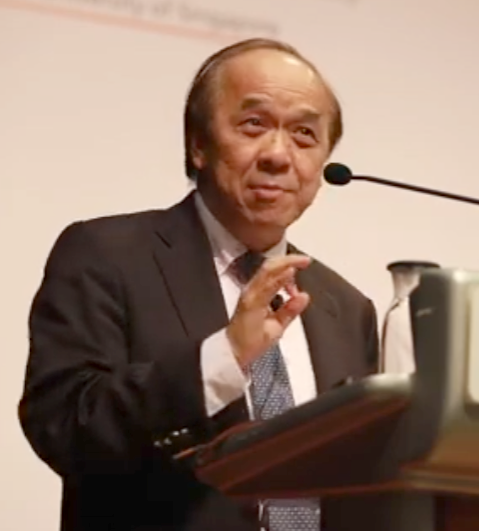
- At a Lowy Institute event in 2019
- Born: 1956 (age 68–69)
- Education: Harvard University
- Occupation: Political scientist

Yuen Foong Khong (Chinese: 鄺雲峰; born 1956) is the Singaporean Li Ka Shing Professor of Political Science at the Lee Kuan Yew School of Public Policy, National University of Singapore. He was previously Professor of International Relations at Nuffield College, University of Oxford. Prior to that, he was Associate Professor of Government at Harvard University. A cited expert whose highest cited paper is Analogies at War: Korea, Munich, Dien Bien Phu, and the Vietnam Decisions of 1965 at 894 times, according to GoogleScholar. Khong's research interests are in United States foreign policy, international relations theory, the international politics of the Asia Pacific region, and cognitive approaches to international relations.

He received his PhD (Political Science/International Relations) from Harvard University in 1987.

== Selected publications ==
- Analogies at War: Korea, Munich, Dien Bien Phu, and the Vietnam Decisions of 1965 (Princeton University Press, 1992; 6th printing 2006).
- With Neil MacFarlane, The United Nations and Human Security: A Critical History (Indiana University Press, 2006).
- With David Malone (co-ed.) Unilateralism and U.S. Foreign Policy: International Perspectives(New York: Lynn Reiner, 2003).
- With Charles Kupchan, Emmauel Adler, and Jean Marc Coicaud, Power in Transition: The Peaceful Change of International Order (Tokyo: United Nations University Press, 2001)
