= China Institutes of Contemporary International Relations =

11th Bureau of the Ministry of State Security

- 中国现代国际关系研究院
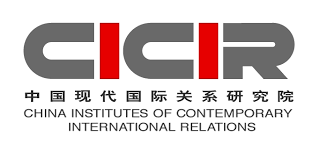
- CICIR logo

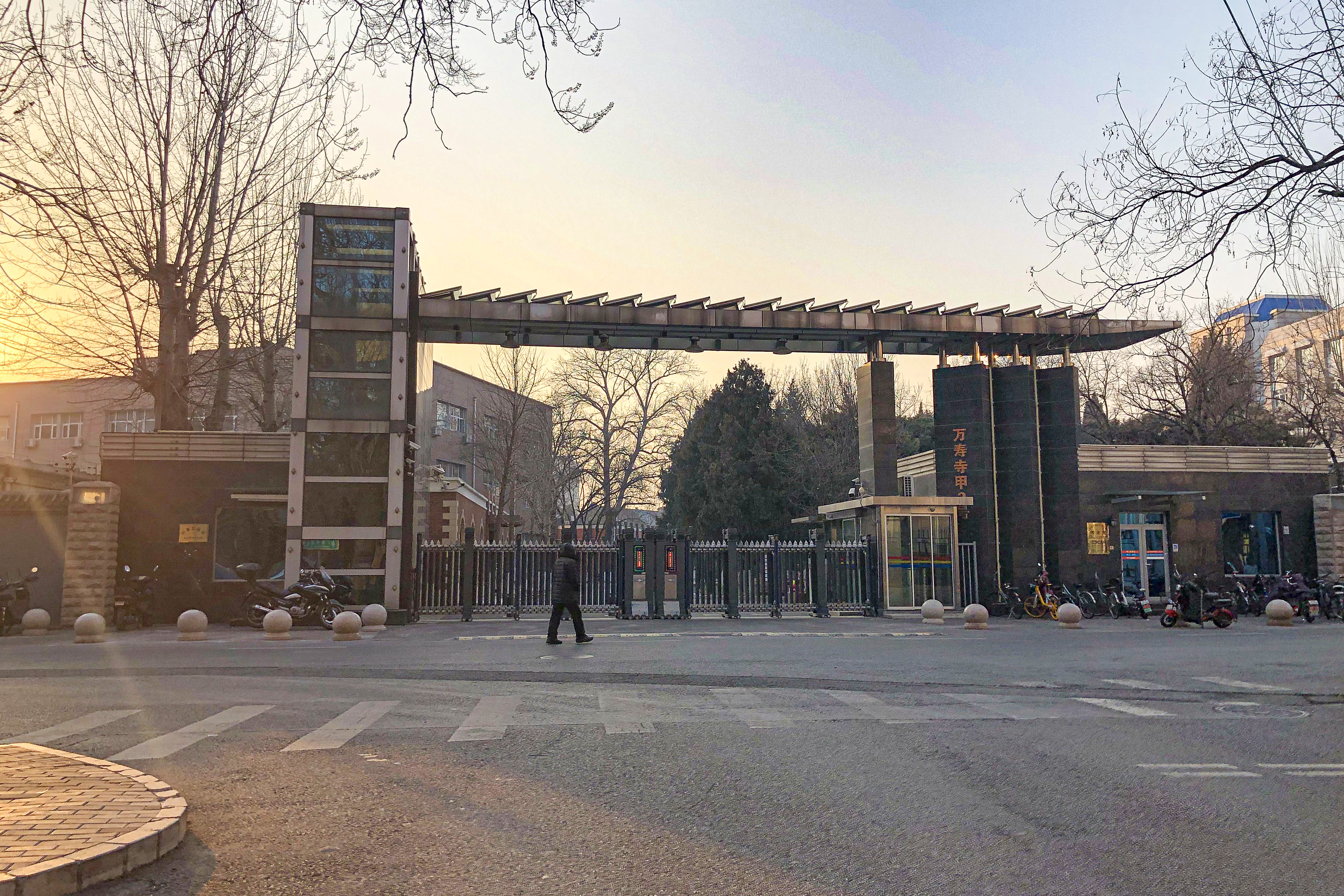
- CICIR headquarters in Beijing in 2023
- Abbreviation: CICIR
- Formation: 1965; 61 years ago
- Type: Government-affiliated foreign policy think tank
- Headquarters: Beijing, China
- Alternate name: 11th Bureau of the Ministry of State Security
- President: Yang Mingjie
- Parent organization: Ministry of State Security
- Affiliations: Chinese Communist Party
- Website: www.cicir.ac.cn
- Formerly called: China Institute of Contemporary International Relations

Chinese name
- Simplified Chinese: 中国现代国际关系研究院
- Traditional Chinese: 中國現代國際關係研究院
Transcriptions
Standard Mandarin
- Hanyu Pinyin: Zhōngguó Xiàndài Guójì Guānxi Yánjiūyuàn

The China Institutes of Contemporary International Relations (CICIR; KICK-er; Chinese: 中国现代国际关系研究院) is the cover identity of the 11th Bureau of the Chinese Ministry of State Security (MSS). It is a set of research institutes used as a front to influence foreign diplomats and academics and collect intelligence. Located in Beijing, CICIR is operated by senior MSS officers. A 2009 report from the CIA's Open Source Center concluded that CICIR resembles a "Soviet-style intelligence organ" whose principle intelligence customer is the Foreign Affairs Leading Group. CICIR is overseen by the Central Committee of the Chinese Communist Party.

CICIR has a staff of approximately 400, including 150 senior research fellows. It consists of 15 departments with different regional and functional concentrations, as well as two research divisions focusing on the Korean Peninsula and Central Asia, and eight research centers. CICIR publishes the journal Contemporary International Relations (现代国际关系; Xiàndài Guójì Guānxì) in both Chinese and English, as well as China Security Studies. The institute is authorized to confer master's and doctoral degrees.

== History ==
The origins of the China Institutes of Contemporary International Relations can be traced back to Chinese Communist Party (CCP) intelligence operations during the Chinese Civil War and Second Sino-Japanese War. Specifically, these early intelligence operations targeted the US Dixie Mission and the Soviet presence in CCP base areas in Yan'an during the 1940s.

In 1964, then-Premier Zhou Enlai ordered the creation of several colleges and university departments to focus on international affairs. A number of ministries, including the Ministry of Foreign Affairs and the Ministry of Public Security, established their own think tanks and research organizations under the decree. CICIR was established in 1965. At that time, it fell under the Foreign Affairs Leading Group of the CCP Central Committee, and served a number of senior officials. CICIR was the only international relations institute or university in China that did not close during the tumultuous years of the Cultural Revolution.

In 1980, amidst Deng Xiaoping's reform and opening up to the outside world, CICIR was designated an "open" institution, and was authorized to engage with foreigners as a means of enhancing intelligence collection. It began publishing the journal Xiandai Guoji Guanxi (Contemporary International Relations) in 1981. The journal became quarterly in 1986, and has been published monthly since 1993.

=== Institutional and personnel ties ===
CICIR is affiliated primarily with the Ministry of State Security, though domestic Chinese media rarely acknowledge this fact. According to Roger Faligot, "CICIR is one of the rare examples anywhere in the world of a think-tank presenting itself as 100 per cent academic, but having become 100 per cent integrated into the intelligence service."

In 1983, CICIR was placed under the bureaucratic management of the newly created Ministry of State Security (MSS). In 1999, it was again placed under the CCP Central Committee, maintaining strong organizational ties to the MSS and Foreign Affairs Leading Group. In 2009, an article in the CCP journal Liaowang, published by Xinhua, called CICIR "subordinate" to the MSS. Hong Kong media have disputed its precise institutional position—whether it is actually the intelligence research arm of the MSS—or whether it merely provides "intelligence research and analysis" for the agency.

Given, however, that the Foreign Affairs Leading Group is its principal customer, and it is largely funded by the MSS, it can be called a "Soviet-style intelligence organ."

In 2003, CICIR changed its name from the China Institute of International Relations to the China Institutes of International Relations.

A number of cases have been reported of CICIR researchers traveling abroad to collect intelligence for reporting back to the MSS. Geng Huichang, the Minister of State Security from 2007 to 2016, served as the president of CICIR from 1990 to 1993. According to David Shambaugh, CICIR's leadership "all share lengthy and shadowy careers in the intelligence services."

== Focus, functions, influence ==
While CICIR's research spans the range of international affairs, its major focus is the US and US-China relations.

Its activities include: providing reports to senior leaders and government departments, publishing research in academic journals, carrying out projects on commission from the PRC government, conducting joint research projects with domestic and foreign institutions, promoting academic exchanges, offering Master's and PhD programs. It conducts "track 2" international dialogues between experts and "track 1.5" dialogues (between government officials and experts).

CICIR is the public face of the 11th Bureau of the Ministry of State Security, China's main civilian intelligence agency.

The institute has held considerable influence over China's foreign policy decision-making process due, in part, to its close organizational proximity to the CCP Central Committee, the Central Foreign Affairs Commission, the Foreign Affairs Office, and the MSS. The institute's relevance to the foreign policy process is further bolstered by its large research staff and ability to produce timely intelligence analysis. This influence has been in decline since the mid-1990s, however, coinciding with the death or retirement of some of its senior researchers, and the growing influence of the Foreign Ministry in foreign policy decision-making.

The CICIR is part of the Green Belt and Road Initiative Center, a platform for CCP influence operations targeting the international environmental movement.

In April 2021, CICIR established the Research Centre for a Holistic Approach to National Security was established in order to further develop the concept of holistic national security. Yuan Peng was the centre's secretary general during his term as CICIR president. In a text issued in 2021, the Centre wrote that holistic national security threats are likely to emerge in "new frontiers" like polar regions, deep sea, the internet, artificial intelligence, and space. In this view, the development of these new frontiers creates uncertainty because they do not have clear geographical borders and therefore transcend traditional ideas of sovereignty.

== Directors ==
- Chen Zhongjing (unknown – unknown)
- Liu Seqing (unknown – unknown)
- Geng Huichang (March 1990 – April 1993)
- Unknown (April 1993 – September 1999)
- Lu Zhongwei (September 1999 – 2005)
- Cui Liru (February 2005 – 2013)
- Ji Zhiye (2013 – 2018)
- Yuan Peng (2018 – 2023)
- Yang Mingjie (2023 – present)

== See also ==
- Center for China and Globalization
- University of International Relations
