= CPC in Dialogue with World Political Parties High-level Meeting =

Chinese Communist Party international event

CPC in Dialogue with World Political Parties High-level Meeting 中国共产党与世界政党高层对话会
- Host country: China
- Date: Since 2017

The CPC in Dialogue with World Political Parties High-level Meeting is an international political party exchange meeting hosted by the International Department of the Chinese Communist Party. It was formerly known as the CPC in Dialogue with the World held from 2014 to 2017.

== List of meetings ==
Basic information of previous dialogues
#	Venue	Date	Theme of the Dialogue
1	Beijing, China	November 30 – December 3, 2017	“Building a community with a shared future for mankind and jointly building a better world: the responsibility of political parties”
2	Videoconference	March 15, 2023	“The Path to Modernization: The Responsibility of Political Parties”

== Meetings ==
=== 2017 ===
The first dialogue was held in Beijing, the capital of the People's Republic of China, from November 30 to December 3, 2017. Xi Jinping, General Secretary of the Chinese Communist Party, attended the opening ceremony and delivered a keynote speech. He also attended other important events such as the opening ceremony, plenary session, and closing ceremony with other party and state leaders. This dialogue was the first multilateral diplomatic event hosted by the CCP after the 19th CCP National Congress and Xi Jinping's re-election as General Secretary. The theme of the conference was "Building a Community with a Shared Future for Mankind and Building a Better World Together: The Responsibility of Political Parties". The purpose of the conference was to gain a deeper understanding of the spirit of the 19th CCP National Congress, mainly the connotation of Xi Jinping Thought on Socialism with Chinese Characteristics for a New Era. The dialogue also provided a platform for political parties from all over the world to discuss and exchange ideas on an equal footing. Political parties from all over the world could also learn from each other's experience in party governance and improve their ability to govern or participate in politics. Through mutual communication and in-depth exchanges, political parties could reach more consensus on major strategic issues. Guo Yezhou, Deputy Minister of the International Department of the CCP Central Committee, said that more than 200 political parties from more than 120 countries around the world had registered to participate in the high-level dialogue, which was "the first global political party leaders' dialogue with the largest number of attendees".

=== 2023 ===
On March 15, 2023, it was held via video link in Beijing time, with the theme of "The Path to Modernization: The Responsibility of Political Parties". Xi Jinping, General Secretary of the CCP Central Committee and President of China, will attend the opening ceremony of the High-level Dialogue and deliver a keynote speech. Leaders of political parties and political organizations from many countries will also attend the meeting. At the opening ceremony, Cyril Ramaphosa, President of the African National Congress of South Africa, Nicolás Maduro, President of the United Socialist Party of Venezuela, Vucic, President of the Progressive Party of Serbia, and Oyun Erdene, Chairman of the Mongolian People's Party and Prime Minister of the Government, spoke. During the plenary session, the leaders of the Pangu Party and Prime Minister of Papua New Guinea, Marape, the Chairman of the Sudan People's Liberation Movement and President Kiir of South Sudan, the Secretary-General of the Sandinista National Liberation Front and President Ortega of Nicaragua, the Chairman of the Supreme Council of the United Russia Party of Russia, Gryzlov, the leader of the National Democratic Congress of Grenada and Prime Minister of the Government, Mitchell, the Treasurer General of the Union for the Defense of the Republic of Togo and the Speaker of the National Assembly, Tsagan, the Chairman of the Amanat Party of Kazakhstan, Kosanov, and the Chairman of the People's Liberation Party of East Timor and Prime Minister Ruak spoke.

== See also ==
- CPC and World Political Parties Summit
