= China Foreign Affairs University =

Public university in Beijing, China

- 外交学院
- Motto: 站稳立场，掌握政策，熟悉业务，严守纪律
- Motto in English: Stand firm, master policies, be familiar with business, and strictly observe discipline
- Type: Public
- Established: 1955; 71 years ago
- Affiliations: Ministry of Foreign Affairs
- Administrative staff: ~170
- Students: ~2,000
- Location: Beijing, China
- Campus: Urban
- Website: cfau.edu.cn

Chinese name
- Simplified Chinese: 外交学院
- Traditional Chinese: 外交學院
Transcriptions
Standard Mandarin
- Hanyu Pinyin: Wàijiāo Xuéyuàn

China Foreign Affairs University (CFAU; Chinese: 外交学院; lit. 'Diplomacy Academy') is a public university of foreign service in Beijing, China. It is affiliated with the Ministry of Foreign Affairs. The institute is part of the Double First-Class Construction.

Since its foundation, there have been over 300 ambassadors and thousands of senior diplomats among the alumni of CFAU, gaining the university a reputation as "the cradle of Chinese diplomats". At present, CFAU has two campuses. The first began operating in 1956; the second one came into service in 2012.

The university maintains two campuses in Beijing: the newer Zhanlanguan Rd Campus (展览馆校区) in Xicheng and the original Shahe Campus (沙河校区) in Changping.

== History ==
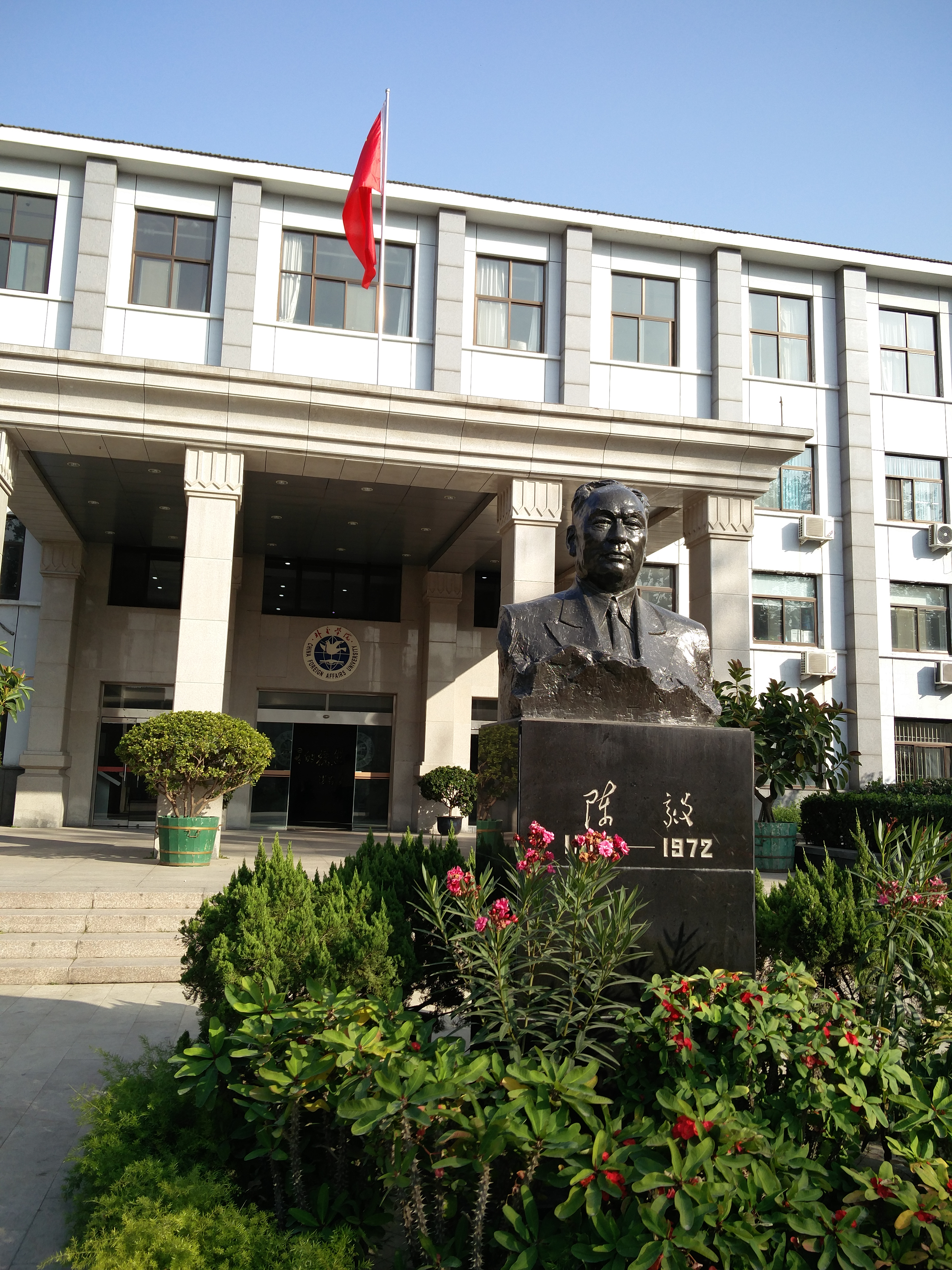
Bust of Chen Yi in university's Zhanlanlu campus.

China Foreign Affairs University was founded in 1955 with the advice of then-Premier Zhou Enlai, and is affiliated with the Ministry of Foreign Affairs (the university is not to be confused with the University of International Relations, also in Beijing). The predecessor of CFAU was the Department of Diplomacy of Renmin University of China. Vice Premier and Foreign Minister of China Chen Yi was the president of the university from 1961 to 1969. The university was forced to close during the years of Cultural Revolution. It was reopened in 1980 under the auspices of Deng Xiaoping. Most of the former presidents of CFAU are ambassadors. The current president is Wan Fan (王帆), specialist in international relations, and its party secretary is Qi Dayu. Before 2005, the university was called the Foreign Affairs College in English.

== Academic ==
The courses of study offered include foreign languages (English, French and Japanese), foreign policy, international politics and relations and diplomacy, international law and economics. The university awards bachelor's, master's, and doctoral degrees. China Foreign Affairs University also holds short-term courses for Chinese civil servants and for foreign diplomats.

CFAU, along with the East Asia Security Centre, began hosting the East Asia Security Forum and Conference (EASCC) in 2001. Presenters at the EASCC symposium include Chinese academics, government officials, ambassadors, senior Chinese Communist Party officials, and senior People's Liberation Army officials. EASCC is attended by foreign academics, foreign government and military representatives, and representatives of international bodies and corporations.

== Model United Nations ==
Model United Nations (MUN) is the most renowned student activity of CFAU. On June 3, 1995, CFAU organized the 1st Model United Nations Conference. It was the first of its kind held in China and attended by Chinese students.

In 2002, together with UN Association of China, CFAU organized the 1st Beijing Model United Nations Conference (BMUN. Its name changed into Beijing International Model United Nations (BIMUN) since 2017). It was the first inter-university MUN in China and was later listed as one of the three most prestigious university MUNs.

In 2004, CFAU again cooperated with UN Association of China and hosted the 1st China Model United Nations Conference (CNMUN).

== Praise and criticism ==
- On July 1, 2008, then UN Secretary-General Ban Ki-moon praised CFAU as "the cradle of Chinese diplomacy; an institution that has firmly established itself as an authoritative forum in active and inter-active discussions on issues concerning China and its expanding role in the international community" in his address given at the university.
- Former French President Jacques Chirac on April 29, 2009, called CFAU "the institute of higher education which cultivates top talents for Chinese diplomacy."
- US Ambassador to China Gary Faye Locke celebrated CFAU as "China's incubator of diplomatic talent" at the Opening Ceremony of U.S.-China Joint Training Program for Afghan Diplomats at CFAU.

In recent years, CFAU has been criticized for putting too much emphasis on the study of foreign languages at the cost of diplomatic training and education, and some consider many Chinese foreign affairs personnel no more than translators or interpreters.

== Fund scandal ==
In 2013, during a thorough investigation by the National Audit Office of the PRC, noncompliance was discovered in the procurement of the Ministry of Foreign Affairs, involving more than 52 million RMB. Among them, about 38 million RMB was associated with the construction of CFAU's new campus in Shahe.

== Rivalry ==
CFAU has produced an array of senior diplomatic officials and proudly claims itself as "the cradle of Chinese diplomats". However, having trained hundreds of Chinese ambassadors, Beijing Foreign Studies University (BFSU) also considers itself "the cradle of PRC diplomats". Rivalry between students of the two universities continue to present day.

== Gallery ==
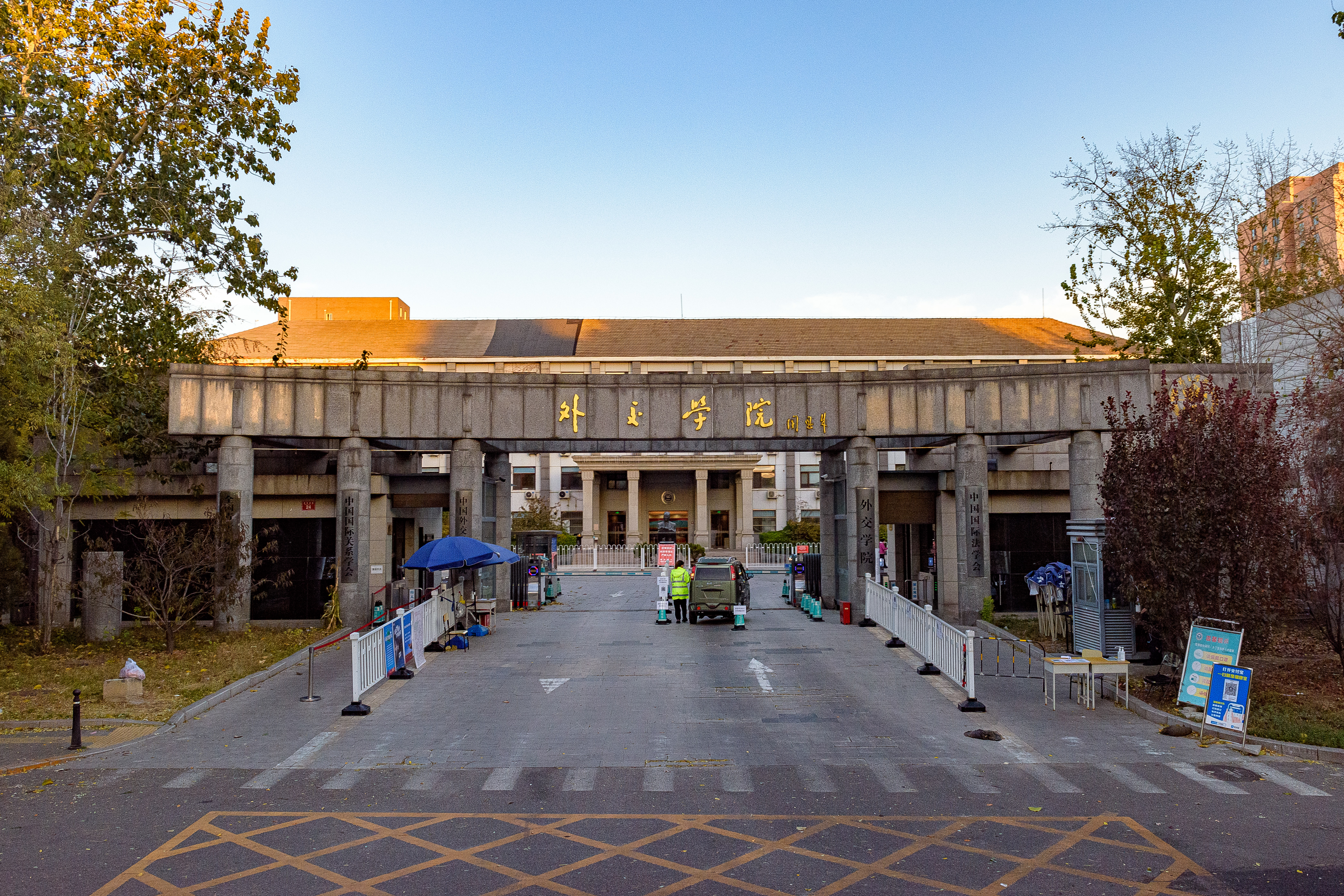
Front Gate of Zhanlanlu Campus

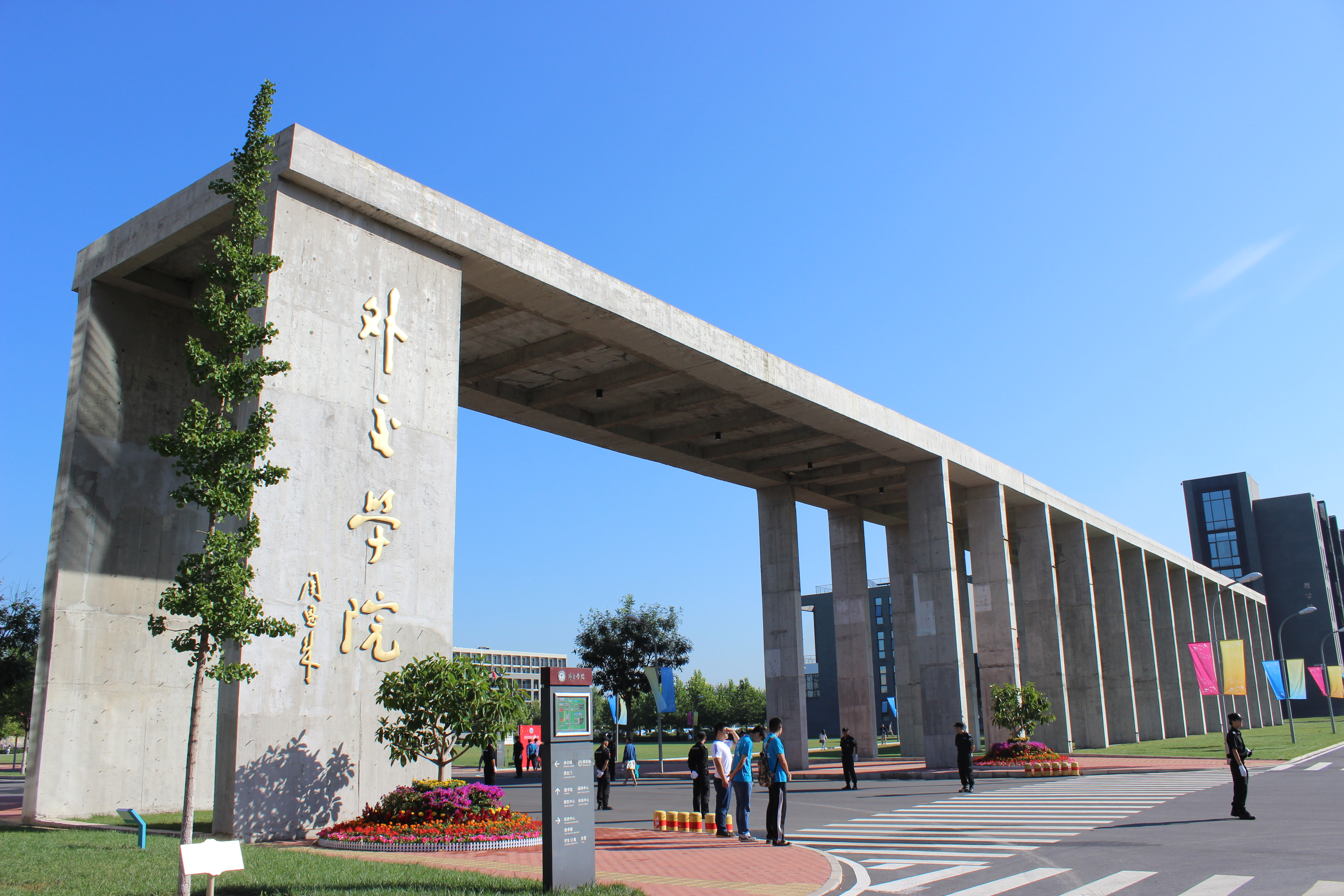
South Gate of Shahe Campus

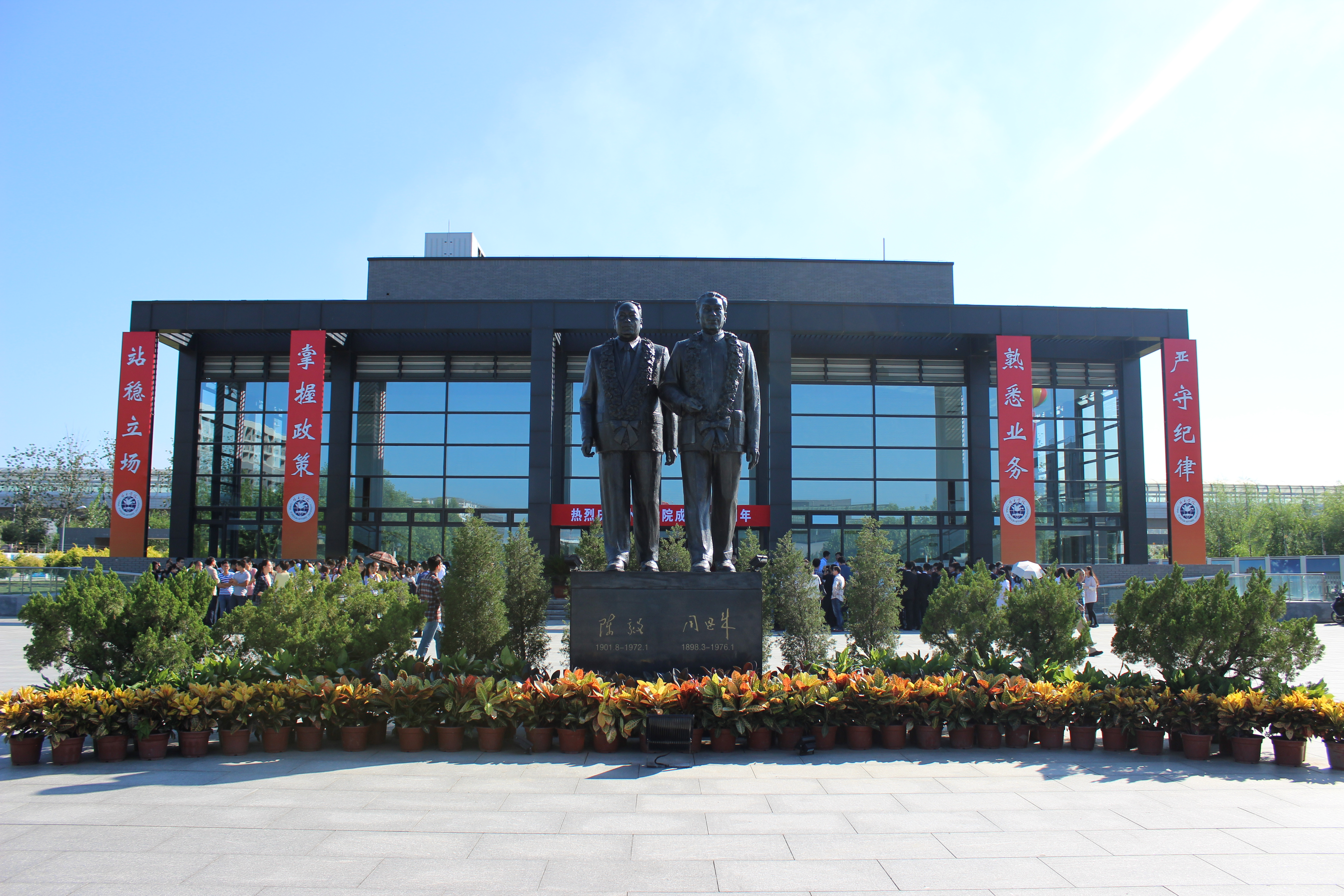
Memorial Statue of Zhou Enlai and Chen Yi
