= Wang Fan (scholar) =

- 王帆

President of China Foreign Affairs University
- Incumbent
- Assumed office September 2022
- Preceded by: Xu Jian

Personal details
- Born: July 1963 (age 63) Shenyang, Liaoning, China
- Party: Chinese Communist Party
- Education: Peking University; University of International Relations; China Foreign Affairs University

Academic work
- Discipline: US studies
- Sub-discipline: US foreign policy
- Institutions: China Foreign Affairs University

Wang Fan (Chinese: 王帆; pinyin: Wáng Fān; born July 1963) is a Chinese scholar who is an expert on US studies, and currently president of China Foreign Affairs University.

== Biography ==
Wang was born in Shenyang, Liaoning, in July 1963. He graduated from the Department of Information Management, Peking University in 1986. After completing his master's degree in law from the University of International Relations in 1992, he attended China Foreign Affairs University where he obtained his doctor's degree in law in 2002. He carried out postdoctoral research at Capital Normal University in 2003. From 2003 to 2004, he was a visiting scholar at Long Island University.

Wang joined the faculty of China Foreign Affairs University in 1992. In 1995, he became a diplomat of the Embassy of China, London, and stepped down in 1997. In September 2006, he served as director of the Institute of International Relations and director of the Center for International Security Studies, and was promoted to full professor in 2007. In April 2015, he was recruited as a part-time professor at the School of Politics and International Relations, Tongji University. In September 2022, he was appointed president of China Foreign Affairs University, a position at vice-ministerial level.

== Publications ==
- 美国对华中长期战略研究 [The United States Long-term Strategy to China] (in Chinese). Beijing: World Culture Publishing House. 2012. ISBN 9787501243990.
- 新开局：复杂系统思维与中国外交战略规划 [New Beginning: Complex System Thinking and China's Diplomatic Strategic Planning] (in Chinese). Beijing: World Culture Publishing House. 2014. ISBN 9787501246205.
- 美国的东亚政策 [United States's Policy toward to East Asia] (in Chinese). Beijing: Social Sciences Academic Press. 2016. ISBN 9787509790496.
- 大国外交 [China's Diplomacy] (in Chinese). Beijing: Beijing United Publishing Company. 2016. ISBN 9787550272569.
- 美国的亚太联盟 [America's Alliance in the Asia-Pacific Region] (in Chinese). Beijing: World Culture Publishing House. 2014. ISBN 9787501230754.
- Fan, Wang; Shengli, Ling, eds. (2017). 中国角色 中国方案：中国特色大国外交 [China's Role and China's Plan: China's Diplomacy with Chinese Characteristics] (in Chinese). Beijing: World Culture Publishing House. ISBN 9787501255443.
- 大国较量——战略博弈的逻辑 [Competition between Great Powers: Logic of Strategic Game] (in Chinese). Beijing: CCP Central Party School Press. 2020. ISBN 9787503568084.

Educational offices
Preceded by Xu Jian	President of China Foreign Affairs University; 2022–present	Incumbent
