= Zhao Tingyang =

Chinese philosopher

Zhao Tingyang Fellow
- 赵汀阳
- Born: Guangdong, China

Education
- Education: Renmin University of China (BA); Chinese Academy of Social Sciences (MA)

Philosophical work
- Era: Modern
- Region: China
- Institutions: Chinese Academy of Social Sciences, Peking University Berggruen Research Institute
- Main interests: Tianxia, Focal points, Compossibility
- Notable works: "The Tianxia System: An Introduction to the Philosophy of a World Institution"
- Website: web.archive.org/web/20081015125204/http://think.blog.enorth.com.cn/article/285731.shtml

Zhao Tingyang (simplified Chinese: 赵汀阳; traditional Chinese: 趙汀陽; pinyin: Zhào Tīngyáng; born 1961 in Guangdong, China) is a political philosopher credited with modernising the ancient Chinese concept of Tianxia. He argues that the concept of a new Tianxia or all-under-heaven can offer an alternative blueprint for creating a more peaceful and inclusive world.

== Biography ==
Zhao Tingyang graduated from Renmin University of China and Chinese Academy of Social Sciences, and is now a professor in the Institute of Philosophy at the Chinese Academy of Social Sciences and is a senior fellow of Peking University Berggruen Research Institute. He was also a Pusey Distinguished Fellow at the Harvard–Yenching Institute in 2013.

According to Zhao's reconstruction of the tianxia system, tianxia presupposed "inclusion of all" and implied acceptance of the world's diversities, emphasizing harmonious reciprocal dependence and ruled by virtue as a means for lasting peace.

== Political stance ==
Zhao was described by China's state media as "a non-partisan person, he always adheres to the Four Cardinal Principles, supports the leadership of the Chinese Communist Party and its basic lines, principles and policies".

== Bibliography ==
=== Books ===
- On Possible Life, 1994, 2004
- One or All Problem, 1998
- The World without a World-view, 2003
- The Tianxia System: An Introduction to the Philosophy of a World Institution (Chinese Edition: 2005). ISBN 978-7-300-14265-4
- All under Heaven: The Tianxia System for a Possible World Order. Berkeley: University of California Press. English Edition (2021). ISBN 978-0-520-32502-9
- Investigations of the Bad World: Political Philosophy as First Philosophy, 2009
- First Philosophy: From Cogito to Facio, 2012
- Contemporary Chinese Political Thought: Debates and Perspectives

=== Selected academic articles ===
- Zhao Tingyang. 2012. ‘The Ontology of Coexistence: From Cogito to Facio’. Diogenes 57:4, (228): 27–36
- Zhao Tingyang and Yan Xin. 2008. The Self and the Other: An Unanswered Question in Confucian Theory. Frontiers of Philosophy in China 3, (2): 163–176
- Zhao Tingyang. 2009. Ontology of Coexistence. Diogenes 228, (4): 35–49
- Zhao Tingyang. 2009. A Political World Philosophy in terms of All-under-Heaven (tian-xia). Diogenes 56, (1): 5–18, 140
- Zhao Tingyang. 2006. Rethinking Empire from a Chinese Concept 'All-under-Heaven' (tian-xia). Social identities 12, (1): 29–41
- Zhao Tingyang. 2007. ‘“Credit Human Rights”: A Non-western Theory of Universal Human Rights’. Social sciences in China XXVIII, (1): 14–26
- Zhao Tingyang. 2005. On the Best Possible Golden Rule. Social sciences in China XXVI, (4): 12-22
