= Li Wangzhi =

Chinese lawyer (born 1977)

- 李望知
- Born: Bo Wangzhi; 1977 (age 48–49)
- Other name: Brendan Li
- Education: Peking University; Columbia University
- Occupation: Businessman
- Parents: Bo Xilai (father); Li Danyu (mother)
- Relatives: Bo family

Li Wangzhi (born Bo Wangzhi, 1977), also called Brendan or Brandon Li, and Li Xiaobai, is a Chinese lawyer and businessman. He is the son of Bo Xilai and Li Danyu.

== Biography ==
Li was born Bo Wangzhi in 1977 to Bo Xilai, then a manual laborer at a factory in Beijing, and Li Danyu, an army surgeon and daughter of the Chinese politician Li Xuefeng. On his fourth birthday, June 20, 1981, his father surprised his mother by asking for a divorce. She refused, but moved out of their home at Zhongnanhai. The case went to court and, despite years of petitions and reports filed by Li, who alleged that Bo had an affair with Gu Kailai, the divorce was finalized in 1984. After his parents' divorce, Bo Wangzhi changed his surname to Li at his mother's insistence.

In 1990, when Bo Yibo retired, Li moved into Zhongnanhai to live with his grandfather; he rarely saw his father, Bo Xilai, and barely associated with him during the latter's political heyday. In 1996, Li graduated from Peking University Law School with an LLB degree. After working as counsel for Sun Media Group, founded by Bruno Wu and Yang Lan, Bo entered Columbia University's School of International and Public Affairs in 2001, reportedly through the arrangement by Yang, who had been a member of the Dean's Advisory Board of SIPA. SIPA denied the report.

While studying at Columbia University, Li befriended his classmate Tang Boqiao, a former Tiananmen student leader, who attributed Li's pro-democracy leanings and sympathy for dissidents to his mother's longtime petitioning over her divorce in Beijing. Their friendship ended when the CCP forbade Li to associate with the dissident. Li also met his wife, daughter of a Dalian entrepreneur, at Columbia. After the couple married in China, Gu Kailai, Bo's second wife, pressured Bo, then governor of Liaoning, to revoke the import and export rights of Li's father-in-law's company.

Li graduated from Columbia in 2003 with a master's degree in international affairs. He was then hired by Citigroup Global Markets Asia Limited, before becoming a businessman, active in Dalian and Beijing. In late 2004, Li became a founding partner of the Lao Niu Foundation, a private foundation established by the Niu Gensheng family. After passing the PRC bar in 2005, he became a practicing lawyer affiliated with Zhong Jing Law Firm in Beijing. In 2007, Li founded an investment consultancy named "Chong'er," which was in close collaboration with Lao Niu Foundation, and adopted the pseudonym "Xiaobai". Historically, Chong'er, the son of Duke Xian of Jin during the Spring and Autumn period, fled his home after being persecuted by his father's concubine and her son, both of whom eventually died in court infighting and Chong'er returned to take power as Duke Wen of Jin. Xiaobai, the brother of Duke Xiang of Qi during the same era, also fled his home to avoid the chaos under his brother's rule. After Duke Xiang of Qi was assassinated by a minister, Xiaobai returned for the throne, becoming Duke Huan of Qi. In 2008, Li founded a company in Hong Kong together with Japan's Daito Kaiun Sangyo Co., Ltd. to invest in Dalian Snow Dragon Beef, a premium beef producer that went bankrupt in 2015. Since 2010, Li has been a partner at Hacheers Investment Co., Ltd., through which he has primarily invested in technology, real estate, consumer, and entertainment industries.

In early 2007, Gu Kailai fainted at Bo Yibo's funeral, which Li also attended. Doctors later informed her that the cordyceps capsules she had been taking were poisoned by lead and mercury. Gu was convinced that Li poisoned her and reported the case to the Beijing police, only to be dismissed. In late 2007, Xu Ming, the bagman of the Bo family, recommended Wang Lijun to Gu to handle the case, which became known as "12/06 Special Case" as on December 6, 2007, Wang established a task force, which soon arrested Gu's driver and another staff member, both were detained in Shenyang for five years without trial and were only released after the Neil Heywood case came to light. In October 2011, Bo Xilai relayed Gu's suspicions that his eldest son had poisoned her to Li Danyu's older brother, Li Xiaoxue, who is married to Gu's older sister. Li Xiaoxue dismissed the suspicions, and Bo was reassured. Both Li Danyu and her son denied the allegations of poisoning Gu.

Li remarked publicly that his father's arrest in 2012 "destroyed his life," leaving him unemployed for a period of time. In August 2013, he attended the opening session of Bo's trial, while Bo's second son, Bo Guagua, remained in the United States. It was the first time Li saw his father after the funeral of his grandfather in 2007. At the trial, Bo referred to his eldest son as "Bo Wangzhi": "Gu Kailai went to great lengths to convince me that Bo Guagua was capable, while Bo Wangzhi was not." The elder Bo also expressed regret over their six-year alienation caused by the "12/06 Special Case", during which he was unaware that Li had gotten married and had a child.

On New Year's Day 2015, Li published a post on Weibo, which was censored afterwards, revealing his father's condition in prison: "His health is okay; despite the limited conditions, he can receive treatment when needed." Li also shared:

A year ago, around this time, my father and I spoke face-to-face for the first time in seven years. His first words to me were: "The materials accusing you of poisoning Kailai and me are in the cabinet behind me, this thick (gesturing about a foot). I never believed any of it." I couldn't hold back my tears.

But it was this fabricated so-called "12/06 Special Case" that implicated numerous individuals from the Beijing and Chongqing Public Security Bureaus, as well as the Central Guard Bureau, separating father and son as if between life and death. To this day, the case remains unresolved, with no one held accountable. Those who created and spread the case have neither clarified the truth nor apologized. Aren't both my father and I victims of this case?

In 2014, remarkably, I saw him more often than in any other year I can recall in the past 30 years, which brought me great warmth. I took every opportunity to visit him, and I hope, within the bounds of the law, to have more chances to do so. After all, life is short. Sometimes I reflect: if I don't see him at a funeral, it's in a courtroom or a prison. Is that a blessing or a tragedy? One can't help but feel at the mercy of fate.
