= Bo family =

Prominent political family in China

Bo 薄
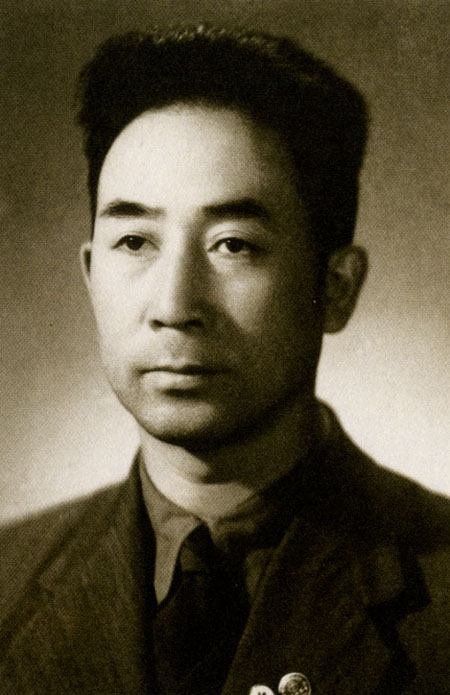
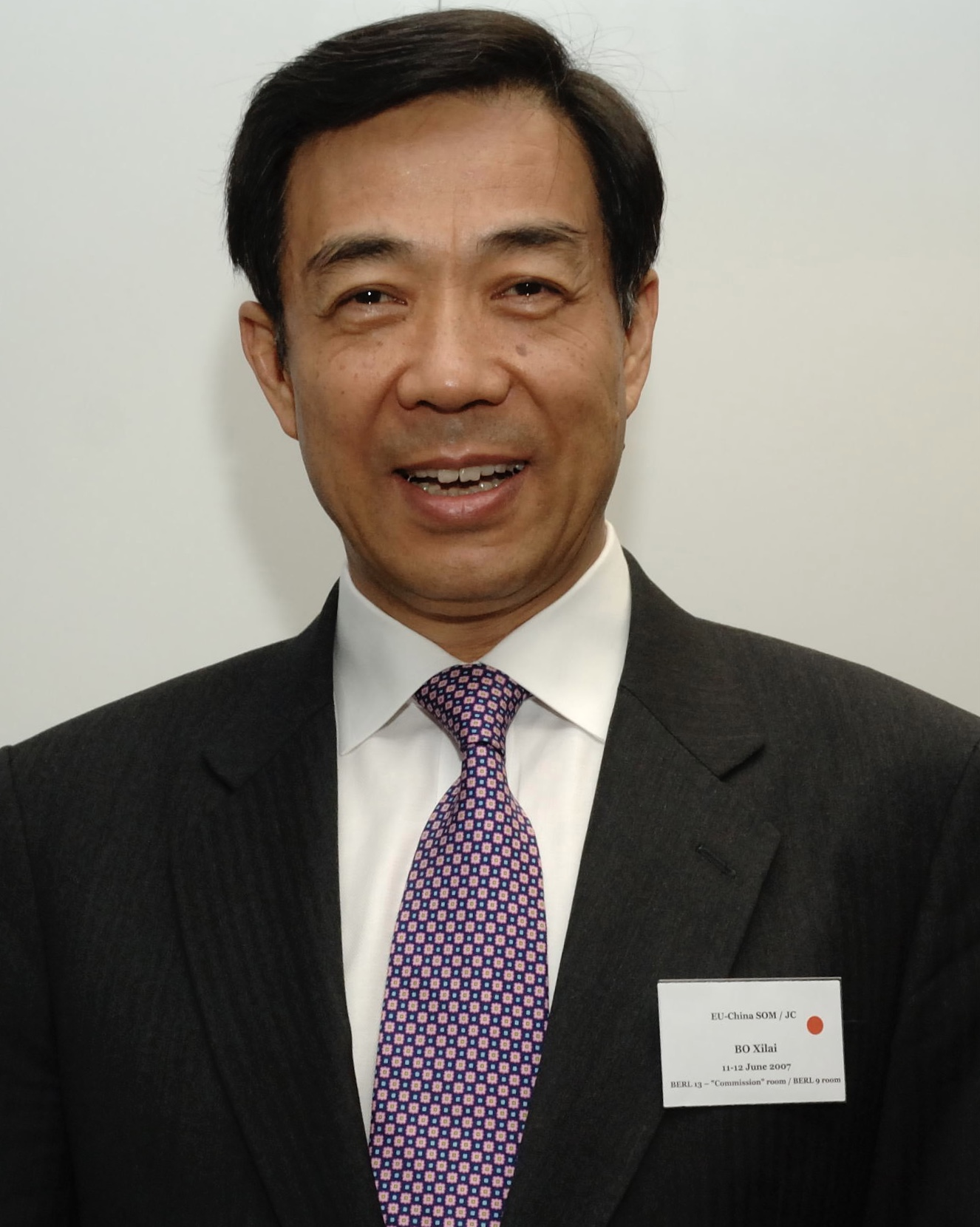
- Bo Yibo Bo Xilai
- Country: China
- Origin: Dingxiang, Shanxi Province
- Founder: Bo Yibo
- Members: Bo Xilai, Bo Xiyong, Bo Xiaoying, Bo Xicheng, Gu Kailai, Bo Guagua, Li Wangzhi

The Bo family is a prominent political Chinese family from Dingxiang, Shanxi. Two of the most well-known members are Bo Yibo and his son Bo Xilai. Bo Yibo was one of the most senior political figures in China during the 1980s and 1990s. Bo Xilai a Chinese former politician who served as a member of the Politburo of the Chinese Communist Party (CCP) and Party Secretary of Chongqing from 2007 and 2012, and was later convicted on bribery and embezzlement charges.

== Bo Yibo ==
Bo Yibo served as Minister of Finance in the early years of the People's Republic of China but who fell from favor in 1965 for supporting more open trade relations with the West. When the Cultural Revolution began in 1966, Bo Yibo, labeled a "rightist" and "counterrevolutionary", was purged from his posts and spent the ensuing twelve years in prison. Bo Yibo's wife, Hu Ming, was abducted by Red Guards in Guangzhou, and was either beaten to death or committed suicide. Under Deng Xiaoping, Bo Yibo was one of the Eight Great Eminent Officials.

Bo Yibo had seven children. Aside from his eldest daughter, Bo Xiying, born to his first wife, Li Ruming, the rest were born to his second wife, Hu Ming. They are: eldest son Bo Xiyong, second son Bo Xilai, third son Bo Xicheng, fourth son Bo Xining, second daughter Bo Jieying, and youngest daughter Bo Xiaoying. Except for Xiaoying, a historian at Peking University, Bo Xilai's other siblings are active in politics and business. As of 2012, reports estimated the Bo family's total assets were worth between $136 million and $160 million.

Bo Yibo had three daughters and four sons. With the exception of his eldest daughter Bo Xiying, all of his other children were born to his second wife, Hu Ming.

=== Children ===
Bo Xiying (薄熙莹) – eldest daughter

Bo Xiying served as Director-General of the Department of African Affairs at the Ministry of Foreign Affairs of the People’s Republic of China. She previously worked at Chinese embassies in the United Kingdom, Zimbabwe, and Denmark, holding the rank of First Secretary.

Her husband, Zheng Yaowen, a graduate of Beijing Foreign Studies University, served as Chinese Ambassador to Denmark (November 1991 – January 1997) and Ambassador to Zimbabwe (April 1985 – May 1988).

Bo Xiyong (薄熙永) – son

Bo Xiyong is an Executive Director and Vice President of China Everbright Group. He graduated from the Department of Automation at Tsinghua University. Earlier in his career, he served as factory director of the Beijing Oil Nozzle and Oil Pump Factory.

In the early 2000s, he reportedly used the alias Li Xueming while serving as a Vice President of the central state-owned enterprise China Everbright Group.

Bo Jieying (薄洁莹) – daughter

Bo Jieying currently serves as Vice Chair of the International Exchange and Cooperation Center of the former Ministry of Health of the People’s Republic of China. She graduated from China Medical University and earned a PhD in Biochemistry in the United States during the 1980s.

Bo Xilai (薄熙来) – son

Former Party Secretary of Chongqing, former member of the Political Bureau of the Chinese Communist Party, and former member of the CCP Central Committee.

Bo Xiaoying (薄小莹) – daughter

Bo Xiaoying is an associate professor at the Center for the Study of Ancient Chinese History and the Department of History at Peking University. She studied history at Peking University.

Bo Xicheng (薄熙成) – son

Bo Xicheng serves as Vice Chairman of the China Association for Poverty Alleviation, Chairman of Beijing Liuhexing Science and Trade Co., Ltd., Chairman of Beijing Liuhexing Hotel Management Co., Ltd., and Chairman of the Board of Trustees of the Beijing Xingda Education Assistance Foundation.

He previously held positions including Factory Director and Party Secretary of the Beijing Cloisonné Factory, General Manager and Deputy Party Secretary of the Beijing Arts and Crafts Corporation, and Director and Party Secretary of the Beijing Municipal Tourism Administration.

== Bo Xilai ==
Bo Xilai rose to become China's commerce minister; and, later, the Communist Party Committee Secretary of Chongqing, but his political career ended with the 2012 Wang Lijun scandal.

== Wives ==
=== Li Danyu ===
Bo's first wife was Li Danyu, an army surgeon and daughter of the Chinese politician Li Xuefeng. The two met in 1975, when Bo was working as a manual laborer at a factory in Beijing. They wed in September 1976 and had a son the following year, Li Wangzhi, born Bo Wangzhi, who also goes by Brendan or Brandon Li, and Li Xiaobai.

In 1978, the gaokao was re-instated and Bo Xilai was admitted to Peking University, where Gu Kailai was also a student. On their son's fourth birthday, June 20, 1981, Bo surprised Li by asking for a divorce. Li refused, but moved out of their home at Zhongnanhai. The case went to court and the divorce was completed in 1984. Gu, in a book she wrote, said she met Bo in 1984 in Dalian, but Li claimed in their divorce case that Bo had been in an affair with Gu after the two met at Peking University. After the divorce, Li did not stay in contact with Bo and insisted that their son change his surname from Bo to Li.

=== Gu Kailai ===
Bo's second wife is Gu Kailai, a prominent lawyer. Gu's father, Gu Jingsheng, was a Communist revolutionary. Her mother, Fan Chengxiu, was a descendant of the renowned Song dynasty chancellor and poet Fan Zhongyan. Bo and Gu were schoolmates at Peking University, and according to Li Danyu, Bo's first wife, Bo had an affair with Gu at the time. According to Gu, however, she first met Bo in Dalian in 1984. The two married in 1986 and had a son, Bo Guagua, in 1987, after which Gu founded the Kailai Law Firm in Dalian. In 1995, the firm relocated its headquarters to Beijing and closed its Dalian branch in 1999. In 2001, it was renamed Beijing Angdao Law Firm.

The couple drew criticism for using Bo's political clout to further the interests of his wife and her law firm. Jiang Weiping claimed that Gu served as Bo's "gatekeeper" when Bo was the mayor of Dalian, regularly accepting gifts and bribes from property developers seeking access to him, and from party officials seeking government appointments. Bo denied that his wife had profited from his position, saying that his wife had retired her legal practice while the couple lived in Dalian in the 1990s. Gu left for Britain with their son in December 1999, out of spite after discovering that Bo had an affair. She lived there primarily until 2007 and reportedly experienced a change in temperament after returning to China, staying at home without working and becoming increasingly paranoid and isolated. According to Bo Guagua, Wang Lijun secretly poisoned Gu "to keep her in a weakened state" in Chongqing. There was also speculation that Bo may have attempted to interfere with a corruption investigation into his wife prior to the Wang Lijun incident, which led to the downfall of the couple. In August 2012, Gu was convicted of the murder of British businessman Neil Heywood after a dispute over money which purportedly escalated until he threatened her son's life. She was sentenced to death with a two-year reprieve, which was commuted to life imprisonment in 2015.

== Grandchildren ==
=== Li Wangzhi ===
Li Wangzhi is the son of Bo Xilai and Li Danyu. In 1996, Li graduated from Peking University Law School with an LLB degree and in 2003 from Columbia University's School of International and Public Affairs with a master's degree in international affairs. He was then hired by Citigroup, before becoming a businessman, active in Dalian and Beijing. He founded an investment company named "Chong'er" and adopted the pseudonym "Xiaobai".

=== Bo Guagua ===
Bo Guagua is second son of Bo Xilai and the only child of Gu Kailai. In 2006, Bo went to Balliol College, Oxford, where he studied Philosophy, Politics and Economics. Bo attracted media attention for his family background and lifestyle, often being described as a "red aristocrat" and "playboy". He was admitted to the Master's program in Public Policy at the John F. Kennedy School of Government, graduating in May 2012. From 2013 to 2016, he pursued a JD degree at Columbia Law School. After graduating from the law school, Bo has lived in Canada. Since his parents' arrests in 2012, he has never returned to China, but his passport was renewed by the Chinese government in 2016. From late 2016 to early 2021, he worked as a business analyst for the Power Corporation owned by the Desmarais family, who have maintained close ties to the Bo family.
