= Song Yangbiao =

Chinese journalist

- Occupation: Journalist

Song Yangbiao is a Chinese journalist for The Time Weekly and supporter of Bo Xilai.

== Biography ==
Song is a freelance journalist with the Chinese newspaper The Times Weekly and has contributed to other newspapers within China.

On August 5, 2013, Song was arrested and detained for pro-Bo Xilai and Anti-Xi Jinping comments made on his Weibo page.
