= Ming Xu =

Ming Xu is the name of:

- Mingsioi, Qing Governor general of the Ili Region
- Xu Ming (徐明, 1971–2015), billionaire entrepreneur, former owner of Dalian Shide F.C.
- Xu Ming (figure skater) (徐铭, born 1981), Chinese figure skater

== See also ==
- Xu Ming (disambiguation)
