= Xu Ming (disambiguation) =

Xu Ming is the name of:

- Xu Ming (徐明, 1971–2015), billionaire entrepreneur, former owner of Dalian Shide F.C.
- Xu Ming (figure skater) (徐铭, born 1981), Chinese figure skater
- Xu Ming (politician, born 1956) (徐鸣), Chinese politician, Vice Chairman of the Jiangsu Provincial Committee of the Chinese People's Political Consultative Conference.
- Xu Ming (politician, born 1958) (徐鸣), Chinese politician.

== See also ==
- Ming Xu (disambiguation)
