= Time Weekly =

Time Weekly may refer to:

- The Time Weekly, Chinese newspaper based in Guangzhou, Guangdong
- Maui Time Weekly, American newspaper based in Maui, Hawaii
