= Jiang Weiping =

Chinese journalist (born c. 1955)

- Born: c. 1955
- Occupation: journalist
- Awards: CPJ International Press Freedom Award (2001)

Jiang Weiping (Chinese: 姜维平; pinyin: Jiāng Wéipíng; born c. 1955) is a veteran mainland Chinese journalist known internationally for his arrest by the Chinese Communist Party in 2001.

In 1999, he began publishing a series of articles about the Communist Party corruption in the Hong Kong magazine Frontline (Chinese: 前哨; pinyin: Qian shao), including a report on Bo Xilai. He was arrested in December 2000 and sentenced to eight years in prison on charges of revealing state secrets, but was granted early release in 2006. After a period of house arrest, he emigrated to Canada in 2009.

== Career in China ==
Jiang is a graduate of the University of Liaoning, where he studied history. In the 1980s, he became a reporter for Xinhua News Agency. In 1984, he wrote his first story about official Bo Xilai, who was then a CCP official in a small town. In the early 1990s, Jiang became the Northeastern China bureau chief of the pro-Beijing Wen Wei Po newspaper in Hong Kong.

In mid-1999, Jiang also published a series of eight reports in Front Line, a Hong Kong magazine, alleging corruption by various Chinese officials. Writing under the pen name "Wen Qingtian", Jiang stated that while mayor of Dalian, Bo Xilai had covered up corruption by his wife Gu Kailai, whose law firm had handled a number of government development and real estate deals. Another article, titled "Former Daqing Mayor Qian Dihua Arrested: Richest Man in the Area Who Kept 29 Mistresses", stated that a mayor had spent state money on cars and apartments for mistresses, while a third reported that Ma Xiangdong, deputy mayor of Shenyang, had lost US$3 million of state money while gambling in Macau. Ma was executed in 2001 for the loss.

== Arrest and imprisonment ==
Despite having written under a pen name, Jiang was soon located by authorities. He was detained in December 2000 on charges of revealing "state secrets". According to Jiang, his lawyer was also arrested one day after agreeing to represent him. On September 5, 2001, he was found guilty in a secret trial, and sentenced to eight years' imprisonment. The sentence was later reduced to six years by the Liaoning Province Higher People's Court.

The sentence drew protest from journalist advocacy organizations around the world. Reporters Without Borders described Jiang as "a courageous and exemplary journalist who did not think twice about the dangers he was running when he denounced corruption at the highest levels in the Communist Party of China". The administration of George W. Bush also protested Jiang's detention and called for his release.

Jiang wrote later that he was tortured by police in an attempt to force a false confession; he stated that he lost consciousness several times and once required hospitalization. After a sympathetic guard agreed to deliver letters to Jiang's wife, who had them published in Asia Weekly, Jiang reported that his treatment improved. In 2003, Jiang was transferred to Wafangdian prison in Dalian, where he performed forced labour.

== Post-imprisonment ==
On January 3, 2006, Jiang was released from prison and placed under unofficial house arrest. In 2009, he was allowed to emigrate to Canada.

He settled in Toronto, serving as a Scholar at Risk at Massey College. In June 2012, Knopf Canada announced that it would publish Jiang's biography of Bo Xilai, who had recently made international news after his wife Gu Kailai was tried and convicted of the murder of British businessman Neil Heywood.

== Awards ==
Jiang was awarded a CPJ International Press Freedom Award in 2001 by the Committee to Protect Journalists, which recognizes reporters or publications who show courage in defending press freedom despite facing attacks, threats, or imprisonment. Initially unable to attend the ceremony due to his imprisonment, Jiang formally received his award in 2009.

He was also awarded the "One Humanity Award" in 2006 by PEN Canada, which included a C$5000 cash prize.

== Personal life ==
Jiang's is married to Li Yangling, who was briefly detained for protesting his imprisonment. The couple have one daughter. In 2004, before Jiang's own release from prison, PEN Canada secured permission for Li and her daughter to move to Canada.

== See also ==
- Jimmy Lai
- Ching Cheong
