= Ching Cheong =

Hong Kong journalist (born 1949)

- 程翔
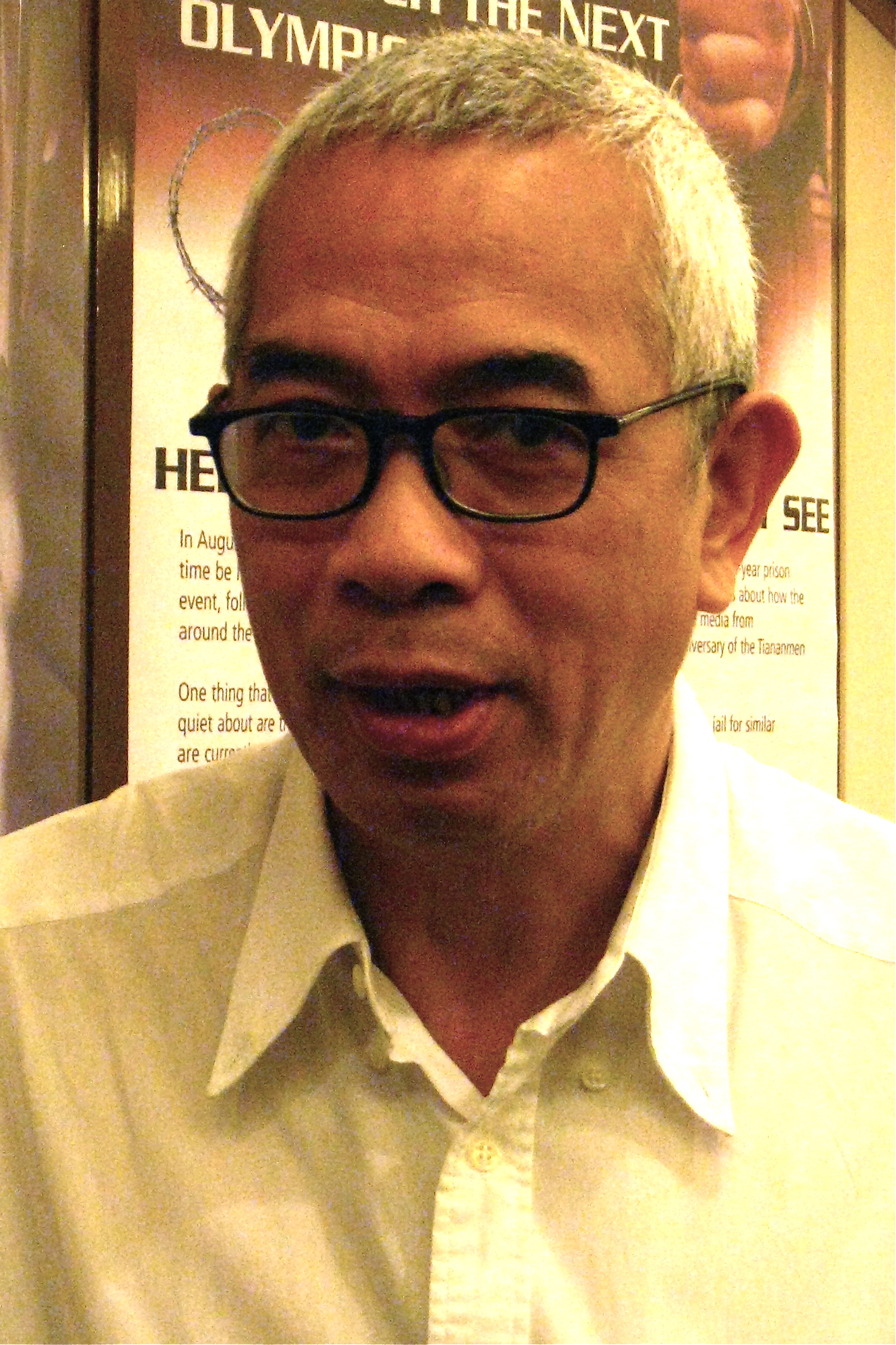
- Cheong in 2008
- Born: 22 December 1949 (age 76); Chaochow, Canton, China
- Education: University of Hong Kong (BEc)
- Occupation: Journalist
- Years active: 1974–present
- Criminal charge: Compromising state secrets of the People's Republic of China via espionage for the Republic of China (2005)
- Criminal penalty: 5 years in prison (2006)
- Criminal status: Released (2008)
- Spouse: Mary Lau Mun-yee (m. 1982)

Ching Cheong
- Chinese: 程翔
Transcriptions
Standard Mandarin
- Hanyu Pinyin: Chéng Xiáng
- Wade–Giles: Ch'eng Hsiang
- Yale Romanization: Chéng Syáng
- IPA: [ʈʂʰə̌ŋ ɕjǎŋ]
Yue: Cantonese
- Yale Romanization: Chìhng Chèuhng
- Jyutping: Cing^{4} Coeng^{4}

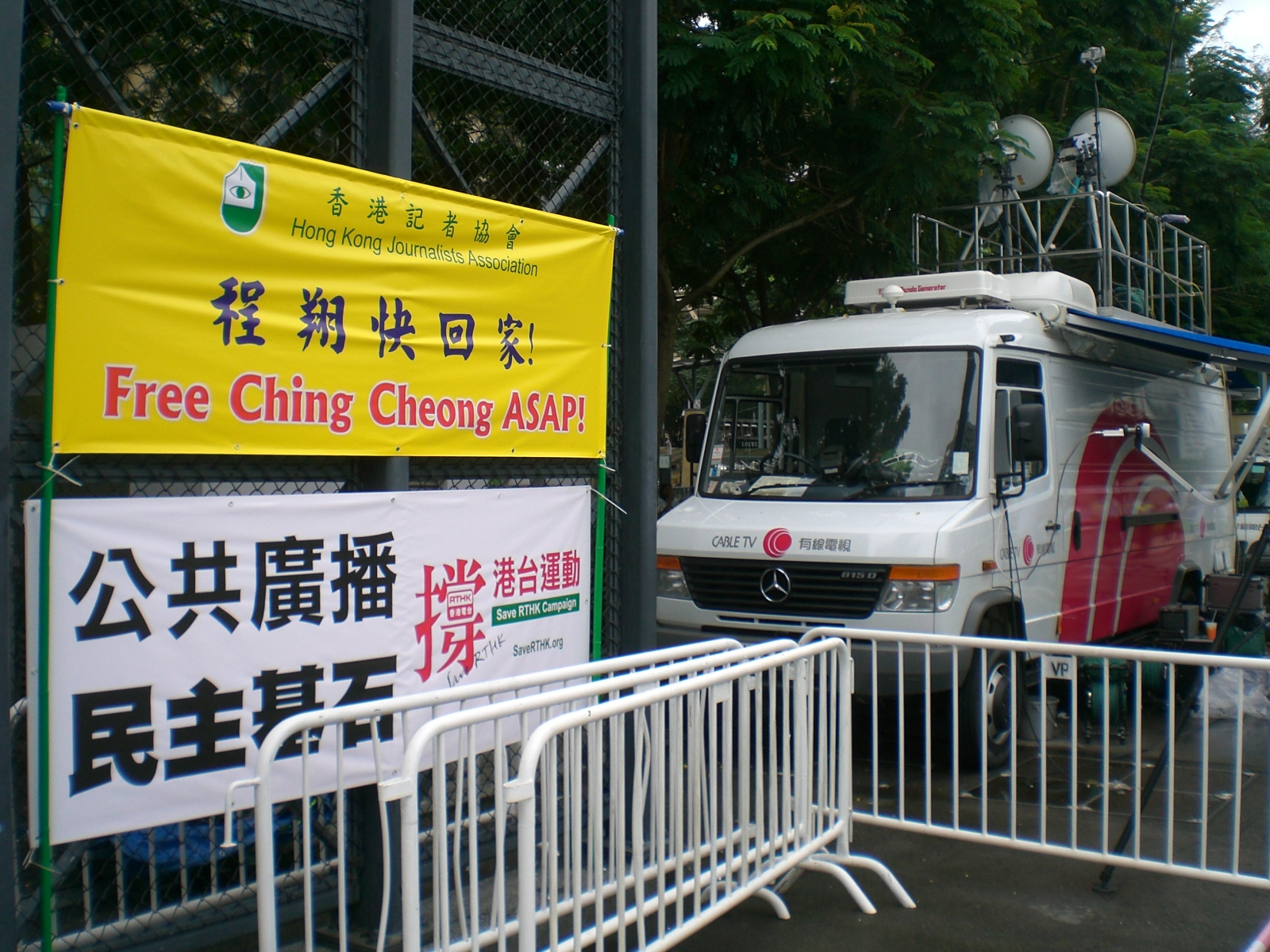
Posters in Victoria Park, Hong Kong, decrying Cheong's ongoing detention in China (July 2007)

Ching Cheong (Chinese: 程翔; born 22 December 1949) is a Hong Kong journalist with The Straits Times. He is best known for having been interned by the People's Republic of China on allegations of spying for Taiwan. He was detained in April 2005 and spent over 1,000 days in prison; his sentencing in August 2006 was for five years' imprisonment, scheduled to end in August 2011, but he was released just before Chinese New Year in February 2008.

== Biography ==
Ching was born in Guangzhou, China, on 3 December 1949. Educated at St. Paul's College, Hong Kong, he graduated from the University of Hong Kong with a bachelor's degree in economics in 1973.

In 1974, he joined the Hong Konger pro-CCP newspaper Wen Wei Po (文匯報), of which he eventually became vice-editorial manager. However, following the Tiananmen Square massacre of 4 June 1989, Ching and around 40 other journalists resigned from the newspaper in protest. Subsequently, he and Li Zhisong, along with a few other journalists, founded Commentary, a political magazine focused on the CCP.

In 1996, he joined the staff of the Singapore-based The Straits Times. Initially, he was assigned to the Taiwan desk, where his articles clearly voiced a pro-unification stance. These articles are collected in his book Will Taiwan Break Away: The Rise of Taiwanese Nationalism. Cheong was later named as the journal's China correspondent.

In a 2021 article for the American non-profit think tank MEMRI, Ching reflected on the 2019–2020 Hong Kong protests, describing China as plotting to destroy Hong Kong by "keeping Hong Kong, but not Hong Kong people" in light of the 2019 Hong Kong extradition bill.

== Espionage charges ==
=== Entry into mainland China ===
In the spring of 2005, he entered mainland China on a Home Return Permit, while researching former Communist Party leader, Zhao Ziyang. On 22 April 2005, he was charged with spying on behalf of a foreign intelligence agency and was arrested in Guangzhou.

The Chinese Foreign Ministry later reported that he had confessed to these accusations. Formal charges were drawn up on 5 August. He was charged with passing state secrets to the Republic of China (Taiwan) over a period of five years. In particular, he was accused of using money provided by Taiwan to purchase political and military information. He is the first Hong Kong journalist to be charged with spying since the transfer of sovereignty over Hong Kong to the PRC in 1997. Ching's wife Mary Lau said that the charges were 'ludicrous'. She also added that Ching had apparently fallen victim to entrapment by an intermediary as he was trying to obtain recordings of secret interviews with the former Prime Minister.

=== International reaction ===
In June 2005, the Hong Kong Journalists Association and Reporters Without Borders organised a petition calling for Ching's immediate release from unfair detention. The petition, containing more than 13,000 signatures, was sent to Hu Jintao, then General Secretary of the Chinese Communist Party and President of China. The International Federation of Journalists and the Committee to Protect Journalists also protested Ching's detention. The British Government was also asked to intervene as Ching held a British National (Overseas) passport.

During the incident, some tabloids in Hong Kong insinuated that he was spying because he had to earn money for a mistress in China. The supposed mistress went to Hong Kong from China and gave witness that she had no relationship with Ching. The accusation ceased when a lot of evidence showed that Cheong was innocent.

On 12 January 2006, 35 legislative councillors including 10 pro-Beijing councillors (including three from the Liberal Party, three from the DAB, and one from the Alliance Party) signed an open letter asking the Chinese authorities to release Ching unless there was sufficient evidence.

=== Imprisonment and release ===
On 22 February 2006, the prosecutor in charge of Ching's case decided to send his file back to the State Security Department for further investigation. The trial was thus delayed for at least one month.

Ching was tried in camera, found guilty of spying, and was sentenced on 31 August 2006 to five years' imprisonment. The family's statement on the same day stated the verdict was extremely biased, adopting only evidence of the Procuratorate while ignoring almost all defence arguments and Ching's defence.

On 1 September 2006, Ching's wife reported that her husband had called the verdict "very unfair" and vowed to appeal the sentence.

On 5 February 2008, the Chinese government announced that they had released Ching from prison early, days before the Chinese New Year holiday.

== See also ==
- Jiang Weiping, a Chinese journalist imprisoned from 2000 to 2006 for criticizing the Chinese Communist Party in his Hong Kong publications
- Jimmy Lai, a Hong Konger activist imprisoned since 2020 for organizing public demonstrations against the Chinese Communist Party

== Published works ==
- Will Taiwan Break Away: The Rise of Taiwanese Nationalism (Singapore University Press, 2001) ISBN 981-02-4486-X
- with Ching Hung-Yee: Handbook on China's WTO Accession and Its Impacts (Imperial College Press, 2003) ISBN 981-238-061-2
