= Bo Xilai =

Chinese former politician (born 1949)

- 薄熙来
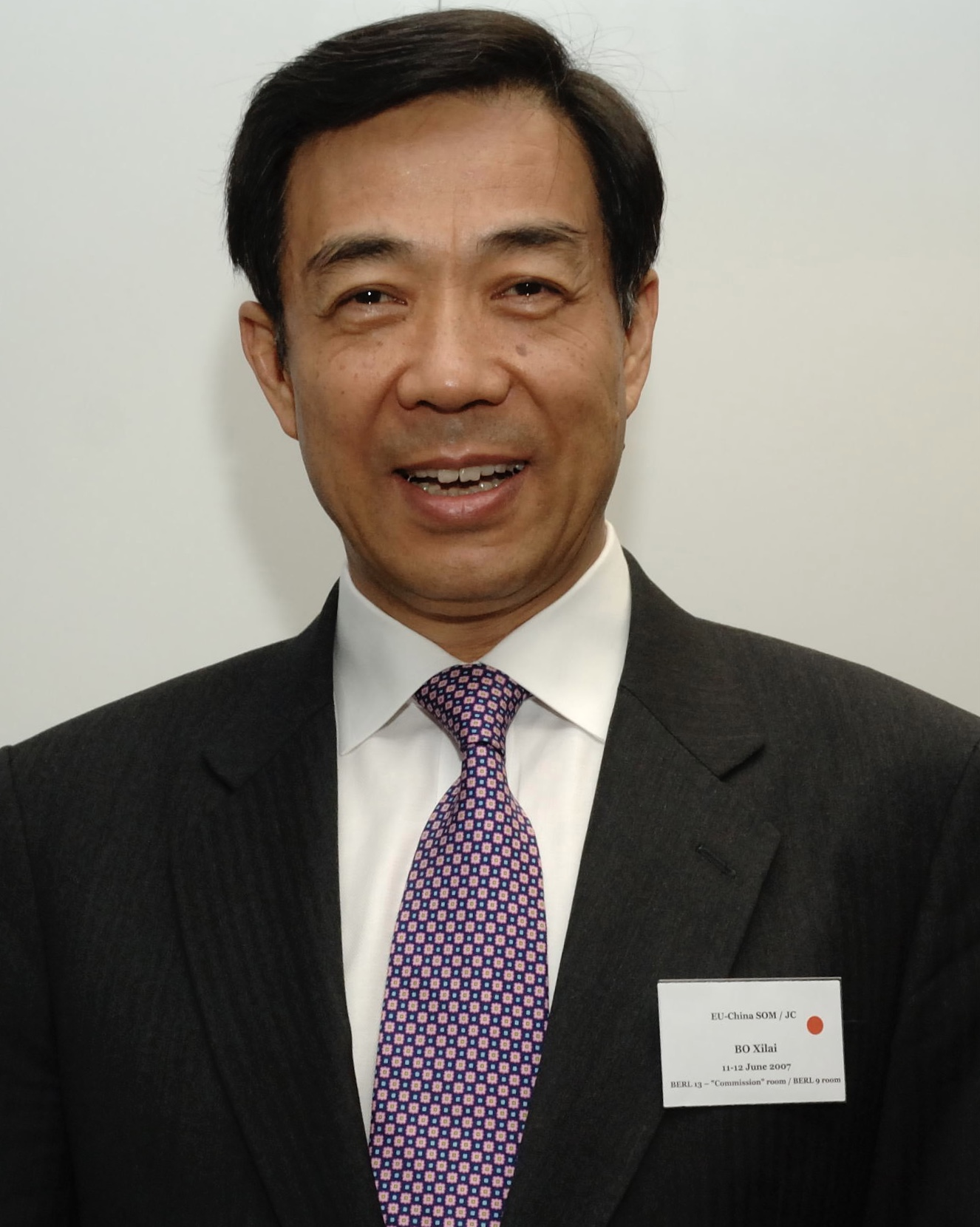
- Bo in 2007

Party Secretary of Chongqing
- In office 30 November 2007 – 15 March 2012
- Deputy: Wang Hongju; Huang Qifan
- Preceded by: Wang Yang
- Succeeded by: Zhang Dejiang

Minister of Commerce
- In office 29 February 2004 – 29 December 2007
- Premier: Wen Jiabao
- Preceded by: Lü Fuyuan
- Succeeded by: Chen Deming

Governor of Liaoning
- In office 24 February 2001 – 17 February 2004
- Party Secretary: Wen Shiyue
- Preceded by: Zhang Guoguang
- Succeeded by: Zhang Wenyue

Mayor of Dalian
- In office 20 August 1992 – 22 August 2000
- Party Secretary: Cao Bochun; Yu Xuexiang
- Preceded by: Wei Fuhai
- Succeeded by: Li Yongjin

Personal details
- Born: 3 July 1949 (age 77) Beijing, China
- Party: Chinese Communist Party (1980–2012; expelled)
- Spouses: Li Danyu (m. 1976–1984) Gu Kailai (m. 1986)
- Relations: Bo Yibo (father); Hu Ming (mother)
- Children: Li Wangzhi; Bo Guagua
- Relatives: Bo family
- Education: Peking University (BA); Chinese Academy of Social Sciences (MA)
- Criminal information
- Status: Convicted by Jinan Intermediate People's Court in September 2013, incarcerated at Qincheng Prison
- Criminal charges: Bribery, Embezzlement, Abuse of Office
- Penalty: Life imprisonment

Chinese name
- Simplified Chinese: 薄熙来
- Traditional Chinese: 薄熙來
- Wugniu: boq^{8} shi^{1} le^{2}
Transcriptions
Standard Mandarin
- Hanyu Pinyin: Bó Xīlái
- Gwoyeu Romatzyh: Baur Shilai
- Wade–Giles: Po^{2} Hsi^{2}-lai^{2}
- IPA: [pwǒ ɕí.lǎɪ]
Wu
- Wugniu: boq^{8} shi^{1} le^{2}
Yue: Cantonese
- Jyutping: bok^{6} hei^{1} loi^{4}
- IPA: [pɔk̚˨ hej˥.lɔj˩]

Bo Xilai (Chinese: 薄熙来; pinyin: Bó Xīlái; born 3 July 1949) is a Chinese former politician who was convicted on bribery and embezzlement charges. He came to prominence through his tenures as Mayor of Dalian and then Governor of Liaoning. From 2004 to 2007, he served as Minister of Commerce. Between 2007 and 2012, he served as a member of the Politburo of the Chinese Communist Party (CCP) and Party Secretary of Chongqing, a direct-administered municipality under the central government.

The son of former Chinese Vice Premier Bo Yibo, he was regarded as a princeling but cultivated a casual and charismatic public image, marking a notable departure from Chinese political convention. In Chongqing, Bo increased spending on welfare programs and maintained consistent double-digit GDP growth, while launching a crackdown on organized crime and promoting Cultural Revolution–style "red culture." His "Chongqing model" gained popularity among the Chinese New Left, composed of both Maoists and social democrats disillusioned with the country's opening up policy and increasing economic inequality. However, his lawless campaigns, rising personality cult, and the dissonance between his family life and egalitarian rhetoric made him a controversial figure.

Bo was considered a likely candidate for promotion to the CCP Politburo Standing Committee at the 18th Party Congress in 2012 and a rival to Vice President Xi Jinping. However, his political fortunes came to an abrupt end following the Wang Lijun incident, in which his top lieutenant and police chief sought asylum at the American consulate in Chengdu. Wang claimed to have information about the involvement of Bo's wife Gu Kailai in the murder of British businessman Neil Heywood, a confidant of the Bo family. In the fallout, Bo was stripped of his positions and expelled from the party. In 2013, Bo was found guilty of corruption, stripped of all his assets and sentenced to life imprisonment at Qincheng Prison.

== Family background ==
Bo Xilai's father was the Communist revolutionary Bo Yibo, one of the Eight Great Eminent Officials, who served as Minister of Finance in the early years of the People's Republic of China but who fell from favor in 1965 for supporting more open trade relations with the West. When the Cultural Revolution began in 1966, Bo Yibo, labeled a "rightist" and "counterrevolutionary", was purged from his posts and spent the ensuing twelve years in prison. Bo Xilai's mother, Hu Ming, was abducted by Red Guards in Guangzhou, and was either beaten to death or committed suicide.

Bo Yibo had seven children. Aside from his eldest daughter, Bo Xiying, born to his first wife, Li Ruming, the rest were born to his second wife, Hu Ming. They are: eldest son Bo Xiyong, second son Bo Xilai, third son Bo Xicheng, fourth son Bo Xining, second daughter Bo Jieying, and youngest daughter Bo Xiaoying. Except for Xiaoying, a historian at Peking University, Bo Xilai's other siblings are active in politics and business. As of 2012, reports estimated the Bo family's total assets were worth between $136 million and $160 million.

== Early life ==
Bo Xilai was seventeen years old when the Cultural Revolution began, and at the time attended the prestigious Beijing No. 4 High School. In the early years of the Cultural Revolution, Bo Xilai is reported to have been an active member of the liandong Red Guard organization and may have at one point denounced his father.

As the political winds of the Cultural Revolution shifted, Bo Xilai and his siblings were either imprisoned or sent to the countryside, and Bo Xilai was locked up for five years. After the death of Mao Zedong in 1976, the chaos of the Cultural Revolution was officially attributed to the Gang of Four, and Bo's father was released. Bo Yibo was politically rehabilitated, and, in 1979, became vice premier.

After his release, Bo Xilai worked at the Hardware Repair Factory for the Beijing Second Light Industry Bureau. He was admitted to the Peking University when the gaokao was reinstated in 1977. Unlike many of his contemporaries in the Chinese leadership who studied engineering, Bo majored in world history. In his second year at Peking University, after the graduate school examination was reinstated, Bo was admitted to a master's program in international journalism at the Chinese Academy of Social Sciences, allegedly through backdoor channels despite not meeting the required exam scores, and graduated with a master's degree in 1982. He joined the Communist Party in October 1980.

== Early career ==
During the 1980s, the Bo family regained its political influence. Bo Yibo served successively as vice premier and vice-chairman of the Central Advisory Commission. The elder Bo came to be known as one of the "Eight Elders" or "Eight Immortals" of the Communist Party and was instrumental in the implementation of the reform and opening up in the 1980s. Although he favored more liberal economic policies, the elder Bo was politically conservative, and endorsed the use of military force against demonstrators during the 1989 Tiananmen Square protests and massacre. After the 1989 crackdown, Bo Yibo helped ensure the ascent of Jiang Zemin to succeed Deng Xiaoping as the leader of the Party and helped Jiang consolidate power in the 1990s. Bo Yibo remained a prominent figure in the party until his death in 2007 and was influential in shaping his son's career.

After the graduate school, Bo Xilai was assigned to Zhongnanhai, where he worked with the research office of the CCP Central Committee Secretariat and CCP Central Committee General Office. In the early 1980s, Bo requested a transfer away from Beijing, a move masterminded by his father for both political and personal reasons. Politically, Bo, inspired by the protagonist Li Xiangnan in the popular Chinese television drama New Star (1986)—adapted from a novel partly based on Xi Jinping, then-deputy party secretary in Zhengding County, Hebei—aspired to gain grassroots experience and credentials to climb the CCP's political ladder. Personally, Bo was engaged in a four-year legal battle to divorce his first wife, Li Danyu, which was finalized in 1984. Facing persistent complaints and petitions from Li, who jeopardized his career by publicly accusing him of having an extramarital affair with his Peking University schoolmate Gu Kailai, Bo relocated to Dalian to avoid the controversy.

== Dalian and Liaoning ==
=== Dalian ===
In 1984, Bo was appointed deputy party secretary of Jin County, now Jinzhou District of Dalian, where Cui Ronghan, an old comrade-in-arms of Bo Yibo, was the municipal party secretary. Bo subsequently became deputy secretary and then secretary of the party committee of the Dalian Economic and Technological Development Zone and secretary of the Jinzhou party committee. Rising again in rank within the party, he became a member of the Standing Committee of the Dalian Municipal CCP Committee, the city's top decision-making body, and became the Vice-mayor of Dalian in 1990. In 1993, Bo became deputy party secretary and mayor of Dalian. He remained mayor until 2000. Bo served as Dalian's deputy party secretary from 1995. Bo was promoted to CCP Committee Secretary in 1999 and served in that position until 2000.

Bo's tenure in Dalian was marked by the city's phenomenal transformation from a drab port city to a modern metropolis, a 'showcase' of China's rapid economic growth. In the early 1990s, Bo took some credit for the construction of the Shenyang-Dalian Expressway, China's first controlled-access freeway, winning accolades for the rapid expansion of infrastructure and for environmental work. Since Bo's time in office, Dalian became known as one of the cleanest cities in China, having won the UN Habitat Scroll of Honour Award in 1999. In addition, Bo was an advocate for free enterprise and small businesses, and successfully courted foreign investment from South Korea, Japan, and Western countries. In contrast to his colleagues, he held press conferences during the Chinese New Year, and developed a reputation among foreign investors for "getting things done".

Bo spent seven years in the city of Dalian, a lengthy term in comparison to colleagues of the same rank, who often transferred to different locales throughout their careers. Despite the accompanying economic growth and rise in living standards, Bo's tenure in Dalian has sometimes been criticized as having been too focused on aesthetic development projects such as expansive boulevards, monuments, and large public parks. To make way for his large-scale projects, Bo's administration moved large numbers of local residents from downtown areas into new homes in the city's outskirts. Dalian's greenery was dubbed "Xilai Grass". He also had a huabiao built. In 2000, Bo was frontrunner for the post of Mayor of Shenzhen, based on his success in making Dalian the "Hong Kong of the North". However, it was suggested that Bo was too independent and outspoken for the post. The post went to Yu Youjun instead.

=== 15th Party Congress ===
During the 15th Party Congress in 1997, Bo Xilai's family launched an unsuccessful campaign to secure his promotion to the Central Committee of the CCP. Although nepotism was generally frowned upon in China, Bo Yibo's ambitions for his son were well known. Bo Yibo suggested that the families of revolutionary elders should "contribute one child" to become high officials; Bo Xilai was selected as his family's "representative" over his older brother Bo Xicheng, for Xilai's superior academic credentials, which included attendance at the elite Peking University and a CASS master's degree.

To secure Bo Xilai's promotion at the 15th Party Congress, his family launched a nationwide campaign to publicize his "achievements" as mayor of Dalian. They commissioned author Chen Zufeng to pen a report portraying Bo as a man who is "as statesman-like as Henry Kissinger, as environmentally conscious as Al Gore, and almost as beloved by the public as Princess Diana." Despite the publicity campaign, Bo Xilai failed to even gain a seat in the Liaoning provincial delegation to the Party Congress. Bo Yibo instead helped him gain a seat with the Shanxi delegation.

Bo Xilai failed to win a promotion, placing second-last in the confirmation vote for membership in the 15th CCP Central Committee and suffering a major political embarrassment. Bo's failure to get elected was attributed to a general opposition to nepotism within the Party. Moreover, during his tenure in Dalian, Bo incurred resentment for the 'special favours' that he procured for the coastal city at the expense of the rest of the province. His perceived partisan interests locked Bo's kin in a factional struggle against Li Tieying, one of China's central leadership figures, who may also have created obstacles to his promotion.

=== Provincial Governor ===
In 2001, a corruption scandal involving former Liaoning governor Zhang Guoguang provided an opportunity for Bo's advancement. Prior to the 15th Party Congress, Bo Yibo and Bo Xilai assisted then-party general secretary Jiang Zemin in preparing to force political rival Qiao Shi into retirement. The Bo family also supported Jiang's "Three Stresses" (San Jiang) campaign in 1997, which was intended to strengthen ideological conviction and promote internal unity in the Communist Party; however, the campaign was generally seen as lacklustre by observers and not universally embraced even inside the party leadership. The Bos' unwavering support for Jiang was said to have worked in Bo Xilai's favour when the vacancy for Governor of Liaoning opened. Bo became acting governor in 2001 after the dismissal and arrest of Zhang Guoguang, and was officially confirmed as governor in 2003. In his position as governor, which he held until 2004, Bo gained membership to the Central Committee of the Communist Party.

During his tenure in Liaoning, Bo played a critical role in the promotion of the Northeast Area Revitalization Plan. Adopted in 2003 by party authorities, the policy aimed to strengthen economic development in the provinces of Liaoning, Jilin and Heilongjiang. Bo Xilai was particularly enthusiastic about the policy, stating his desire to see the Northeast become "China's fourth economic engine" (the others being the Pearl River Delta, Yangtze River Delta, and the Bohai Economic Region).

The Northeast was at one time known as the "cradle of industrialization" of China. In 1980, industrial output for Liaoning alone was twice that of the Guangdong. However, the northeast was left behind amidst market reforms of the 1980s and 1990s, while Guangdong and other provinces along the South and East China Sea coasts prospered. Its economy—still largely tied to state-owned enterprises—stagnated relative to other regions, with high unemployment rates. The revitalisation plan aimed to address this by reviving the region's traditional industries, strengthening trade ties with and encouraging investment from South Korea and Japan, and experimenting with free trade zones in select cities. In 2004, official media reported that foreign direct investment in Liaoning had nearly doubled since the launch in 2003 of the northeastern rejuvenation strategy.

Although Bo established a reputation as a comparatively clean politician during his tenures in Dalian and as governor of Liaoning, he was not immune to corruption allegations. In particular, Bo was the subject of critical investigative reports by Liaoning journalist Jiang Weiping, the whistleblower in the Mu and Ma corruption case in Liaoning – a scandal that Bo benefited from politically. While Bo was not directly involved in the scandal, Jiang accused Bo of providing political cover for his friends and relatives. Jiang was initially sentenced to eight years in prison on trumped-up charges, for which Bo was criticized, but was released after five years under international pressure.

Yang Rong, the founder and former chief executive of China's largest automaker Brilliance China Automotive, accused Bo of interfering in his judicial proceedings in Beijing. Yang had made a bid to locate a Brilliance factory in Ningbo, China. In his attempt Yang incurred the wrath of Bo, as Bo demanded that Yang locate the factory in Liaoning, and Yang refused. In 2002, Bo seized Yang's stake of $700 million in Brilliance. Bo also accused Yang of embezzlement, and had an arrest warrant issued against him, precipitating Yang's flight from China in July 2002; since then Yang has been living in exile in the United States.

In addition, Bo openly clashed with Wen Shizhen, then-party secretary in Liaoning who was technically Bo's superior. Wen reportedly criticized Bo for "developing China's cities like Europe and its countryside like Africa," and even held a party to celebrate Bo's departure from Liaoning in 2004.

Ethan Gutmann, citing Falun Gong allegations that Liaoning was the epicenter of organ harvesting from practitioners while Bo was governor, suggested that he may have used his involvement as a way of building up his political power. David Kilgour, who co-wrote the Kilgour–Matas report on organ harvesting, claimed Bo may have played a role. Separately, Falun Gong practitioners abroad filed over ten lawsuits against Bo alleging torture and crimes against humanity. In 2009, a Spanish court indicted Bo Xilai and four other officials for genocide against Falun Gong based on those allegations.

=== 16th Party Congress ===
At the 16th Party Congress in 2002, Bo's age, regional tenures, and patronage links fit the profile for a potential candidate to be groomed for the "5th generation of leaders" that would assume power in 2012. His chief competitors were seen as Xi Jinping, then party secretary of Zhejiang, and Li Keqiang, a populist Tuanpai candidate who was the Governor of Henan. As with the 15th Party Congress five years earlier, the elder Bo lobbied for his son's promotion. The Bo family enjoyed the patronage of Jiang Zemin. However, Bo Xilai's unequivocal support for Jiang strengthened the reluctance of his political opponents to support his nomination. Ultimately, although Bo Xilai remained a top contender for higher promotion, Xi and Li remained the main candidates to succeed Hu Jintao as paramount leader.

== Minister of Commerce ==
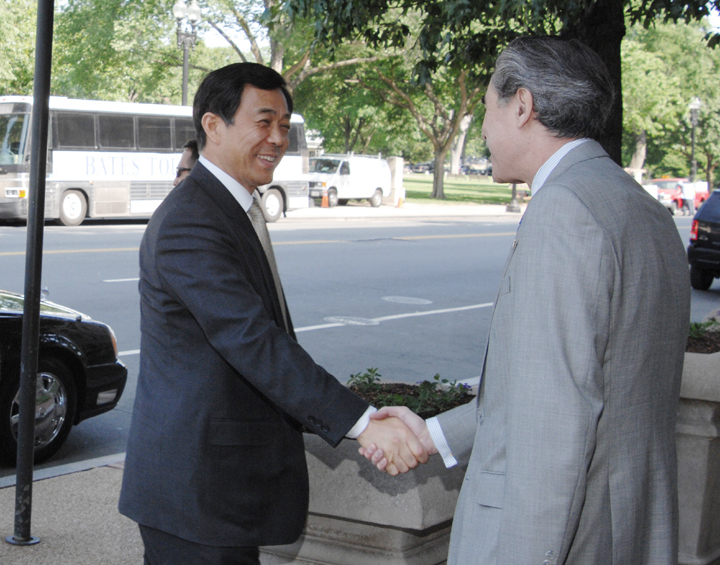
Commerce Minister Bo meets his American counterpart, Carlos Gutierrez, during a visit to the United States in 2007

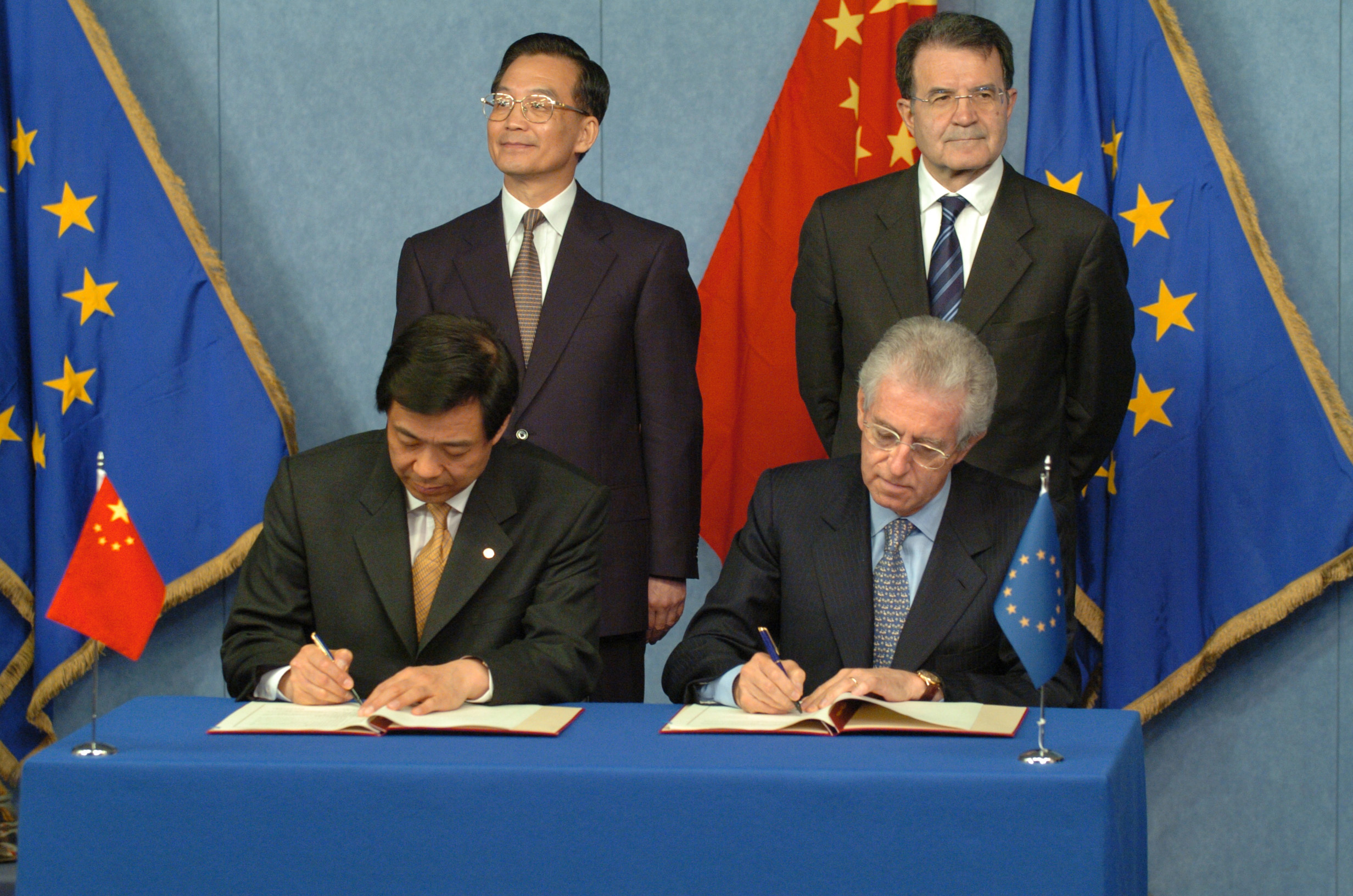
Bo signing "Terms of Reference for the EU-China Competition Policy Dialogue" with European Commissioner for Competition Mario Monti, with the signing witnessed by Premier of China Wen Jiabao and President of the European Commission Romano Prodi in 2004

When Hu Jintao succeeded Jiang Zemin as CCP General Secretary in late 2002, Bo's career as a local official ended with his appointment to Minister of Commerce in Premier Wen Jiabao's cabinet to replace Lü Fuyuan, who retired for health reasons. Bo also earned a seat on the 16th Central Committee of the Chinese Communist Party.

Bo's stint as Minister of Commerce significantly raised his international profile and generated media attention both in China and abroad. Described as good-looking, articulate and open-minded in his approach to problems, Bo's rise from a municipal official to the central government generated great media fanfare and elevated his status to something of a "political star". Bo's political persona was considered a departure from the generally serious and conservative leadership in Beijing. With his youthful vigour, populism, and purported popularity with female reporters, Bo's political rise had been compared to that of John F. Kennedy.

Bo presided over a continued rise in foreign investment in China as Minister of Commerce. His daily schedule was dominated by receiving foreign guests and dignitaries. By the time that he became Minister, he spoke relatively fluent and colloquial English. During a meeting with American officials, Bo reputedly told a struggling interpreter to stop translating because the Chinese officials could understand English and it was wasting time. In May 2004 Bo was one of the few ministers hand-picked to accompany Premier Wen Jiabao on a five-country trip to Europe. The trade policy of the United States toward China also sparked significant controversy. Bo maintained a conciliatory but assertive attitude as he attended talks in Washington, D.C. On his trips to the United States, he conducted substantive discussions with his American counterparts and signed agreements on intellectual property, the services sector, agricultural products, food safety, and consumer protection.

Bo also oversaw the restructuring of the Ministry, formed from the amalgamation of the National Economics and Commerce Bureau and the Department of International Trade. Bo sought to balance the amount of attention given to foreign investors and domestic commercial institutions. He began tackling the imbalance from the retail sector, whose success up to that point was largely dependent on foreign companies. He drew up plans to protect Chinese industries' competitive position within a domestic market that was quickly being crowded out by foreign competition.

=== 17th Party Congress ===
At the 17th Party Congress in October 2007, Bo gained a seat on the 25-member Politburo, effectively China's ruling council. He was then tipped to leave the Ministry of Commerce and take over as CCP Committee secretary of Chongqing. Bo's predecessor, political rival Wang Yang, was reassigned as party secretary of Guangdong.

At the time, Chongqing was reeling from problems such as air and water pollution, unemployment, poor public health, and complications from the Three Gorges Dam. Bo was initially reluctant to go to Chongqing and was reportedly unhappy with his new assignment. He had hoped to become vice premier instead, but Premier Wen Jiabao and Vice Premier Wu Yi argued against Bo's promotion to vice-premiership. In particular, Wu was critical of Bo's penchant for self-promotion, and Wen cited international lawsuits against Bo by Falun Gong adherents as a barrier to his holding higher office.

Bo took up the Chongqing post on 30 November, a month following the conclusion of the Congress, even though Wang Yang had vacated the position on 13 November. Whilst some saw this transfer as a 'banishment' from the central government to the hinterlands to keep Bo's perceived arrogance and high-profile antics out of Beijing's view, others considered it a promotion since being the party secretary in one of the four direct-administered municipalities came with an ex officio seat on the Politburo.

== Chongqing ==
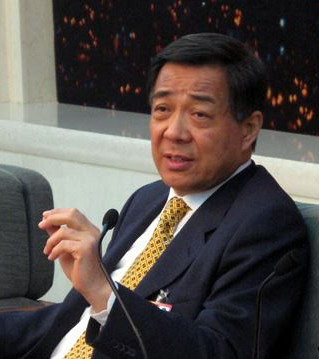
Bo (July 2011)

=== The Chongqing model ===
Although Bo was initially unhappy about his reassignment in Chongqing, he soon resolved to use his new position as a staging ground for a return to higher national office. Bo made no secret of his desire to enter the nine-member CCP Politburo Standing Committee (PSC) during the 18th Party Congress in autumn 2012, as all but two of the PSC members—including CCP General Secretary Hu Jintao and Premier Wen Jiabao—were expected to retire. The transition would be an opportunity for Bo to join the highest echelon of national leadership, likely as a replacement for ally Zhou Yongkang, secretary of the CCP Central Political and Legislative Committee, serving as the head of the party's security apparatus.

In Chongqing, Bo pioneered a new style of governance dubbed the "Chongqing Model" – a set of social and economic policies intended to address diverse challenges facing modern China following economic reforms. This made him the champion of the Chinese New Left, composed of both Maoists and social democrats disillusioned with the country's market-based economic reforms and increasing economic inequality.

The Chongqing model was characterized in part by increased state control and the promotion of a neo-leftist ideology. Along with his police chief Wang Lijun, Bo launched a sweeping campaign against organized crime, and increased the security and police presence in the city. Critics noted these policies were accompanied by the erosion of the rule of law, and allegations surfaced of political and personal rivals being victimized amidst Bo's anti-corruption drive. As a means of addressing declining public morality, Bo launched a "red culture" movement to promote Maoist-era socialist ethics. On the economic front, he actively courted foreign investment—much as he had done in Liaoning. The Chongqing model was also characterized by massive public works programs, subsidized housing for the poor, and social policies intended to make it easier for rural citizens to move to the city, thus reaping the benefits of urban status.

The Chongqing model provided an alternate development paradigm that diverged from the policies preferred by those in the national leadership seen as favouring further reform such as Hu Jintao and Wen Jiabao. Bo's leadership in Chongqing dramatically raised his profile, both nationally and internationally. In 2010, he was named as one of the 'World's 100 Most Influential People in 2010' by Time. Observers noted that, in China's non-electoral political system, Bo's high-profile presence and bold political maneuvers essentially amounted to a public 'election campaign' for the top leadership. However, he drew the ire of some of the country's leaders; General Secretary Hu and Premier Wen were reluctant to acknowledge Bo publicly, ostensibly due to a discomfort over his leadership style.

==== Organized crime ====
Bo's tenure in Chongqing was dominated by a protracted war against organized crime and corruption known as "打黑" (dǎhēi; 'striking the black'). Between 2009 and 2011, an estimated 5,700 people were arrested in the sweeping campaign that ensnared not only criminals, but also businessmen, members of the police force, judges, government officials, and political adversaries. The campaign was overseen by Chongqing police chief Wang Lijun, whom Bo had worked with previously in Liaoning.

Wen Qiang, one of the most prominent figures implicated in the trials, had been a prominent municipal official since the days of party secretaries He Guoqiang and Wang Yang. Wen, the former executive deputy commissioner of the Chongqing police force Public Security for 16 years, was tried and convicted of a litany of crimes and sentenced to death in a sensational headline-grabbing trial. Contrary to the popular perception at the time that the campaign was part of Bo's perceived penchant for self-promotion, China observer Willy Lam suggested that such a large-scale crackdown will have received approval from central authorities, including Hu Jintao, and that Bo became careful to not let Chongqing appear to be trying to 'set an example' for the rest of the country so he could benefit from the success politically.

The dahei campaign earned Bo national recognition and widespread popularity in Chongqing—all the more because of the city's historical reputation as a center for criminal activity. In contrast to often colourless and orthodox politicians, Bo gained the reputation as a party boss that "got things done". The apparent success of dǎhēi earned Bo 'rock star status', and resulted in calls to replicate the campaign on a nationwide scale. Through the campaign, Bo gained the support of a number of powerful members of the Politburo Standing Committee, including Wu Bangguo, Jia Qinglin, Li Changchun, Xi Jinping and Zhou Yongkang, all of whom visited Chongqing or praised Bo's achievements sometime between 2010 and 2011.

However, Bo's campaign was criticized for running roughshod over judicial due process and eroding the rule of law. Individuals targeted in the campaign were arbitrarily detained by the authorities, with an estimated 1,000 being sent to forced labour. Lawyers for the accused were intimidated and harassed, and in at least one case, sentenced to 18 months in prison. Allegations also surfaced over the use of torture to extract confessions. Moreover, assets seized during the campaign were allegedly redirected to help pay for Bo's popular social housing programs. The Wall Street Journal reported that US$11 billion went into government coffers through the campaign. Li Jun, a fugitive businessman, asserted that he became a target of Bo anti-corruption drive as a result of a land dispute with the government. When he refused government demands to give up the land, he claims that he was abducted and tortured, and that US$700 million worth of assets in his business were seized.

==== Red culture movement ====
During his time in Chongqing, Bo initiated a series of Maoist-style campaigns to revive 'red culture' and improve public morale, known as "唱红" (chànghóng; 'singing red (songs)'). The initiative included the promotion of Maoist quotes, 'red' songs, revolutionary television programming and operas, and initiatives to encourage students to work in the countryside, akin to the way students were required to do during the Down to the Countryside Movement of the Cultural Revolution. As part of the movement, Bo and the city's Media Department initiated a "Red Songs campaign" that demanded every district, government department, commercial enterprise, educational institution, state radio and TV stations begin singing 'red songs' praising the achievements of the Communist Party. Bo pledged to reinvigorate the city with the Marxist ideals reminiscent of the Mao era.

Prior to the 60th Anniversary of the People's Republic of China celebrations, for instance, Bo sent out 'red text messages' to the city's 13 million mobile phone users. According to Xinhua, Bo's text messages were usually quotes from Mao's Little Red Book, and include phrases such as "I like how chairman Mao puts it: The world is ours, we will all have to work together," and "responsibility and seriousness can conquer the world, and the Chinese Communist Party members represent these qualities." Bo and his team of municipal administrators also erected new Mao statues in Chongqing, while providing 'social security apartments' to the city's less well-off. Some scholars have characterized this as an example of the revival of Maoism in the Chinese Communist ethos.

Reactions to the red culture movement were divided. Bo's revival of Mao-era culture and accompanying social welfare programs were popular within much of the middle to lower income strata of Chongqing society, and made Bo a star with both conventional Marxists and neo-leftists. Bo won praise for returning the city to what some called China's 'true socialist heritage' by de-emphasizing material wealth, and evoked nostalgia to the social egalitarianism that existed during Mao's time. Some retirees were particularly inspired and said they wanted to pass on "revolutionary spirit" to their children, while others participated as a means to praise the Communist Party for the country's economic progress.

The campaign also had many detractors. Some intellectuals and reformers criticized the campaign for being regressive, akin to "being drowned in a red sea", and bringing back painful memories from the Cultural Revolution. Several mid-level officials in the city committed suicide due to overwhelming pressure to organize events for the red songs campaign. Bo's critics derisively referred to him as "little Mao".

==== Social policies ====
A cornerstone of Bo's Chongqing model involved a series of egalitarian social policies aimed to lessen the gap between rich and poor, and ease the rural-urban divide. Bo promoted the notion of pursuing "red GDP"—an economic model embodying communist egalitarianism—and suggested that, if economic development were analogous to 'baking a cake', then the primary task should be to divide the cake fairly rather than building a larger cake.

To that end, the city reportedly spent $15.8 billion on public apartment complexes for use by recent college graduates, migrant workers and low-income residents. In 2007, the cities of Chongqing and Chengdu were selected to run pilot projects intended to mitigate the rural-urban divide and ease integration of rural residents into the cities. Under China's hukou registration system at the time, citizens were classified as either rural or urban—a distinction that affected educational opportunities, health benefits, and social welfare, effectively making rural hukou holders "second class citizens". Of Chongqing's 32 million residents, only 27% held urban hukou as of 2007. The 2007 project made it easier for rural residents to obtain urban status, a policy intended not only to help balance inequality, but also to enable the government to develop underused rural land. Under Bo's leadership, Chongqing established "land exchanges" where rural villages could earn credits for maximizing farmland.

Bo's approach to social policy was demonstrated during the November 2008 taxi strikes, which saw over 8,000 taxi drivers take to the streets for two days in protests over high fees, unregulated competition and rising fuel costs. Similar protests in China were frequently suppressed—sometimes forcefully—with official media sometimes blaming labour unrest on criminal instigation. Bo's government instead held a televised roundtable dialogues with the protesters and citizens, and agreed to allow the formation of a trade union. His handling of the situation earned him praise as a comparatively restrained and progressive leader.

==== Economic policies ====
Another major component of Bo's Chongqing model concerned the city's economic policies. Just as he had done in Liaoning, Bo ambitiously pursued foreign investment in the city, lowering corporate income tax rates (15% compared to the 25% national average), and sought to stimulate rapid urbanization and industrialization. He also carried on with policies initiated by his predecessors which focused on domestic consumption, rather than export-led growth. During his tenure, Chongqing reported annual GDP growth far exceeding the national average. In 2008, for instance, nationwide GDP growth was reported at 8%, while Chongqing reported 14.3%; the same year, foreign trade rose by 28%, and bank loans were up 29%.

Bo's model of economic growth won national and international praise for seamlessly combining foreign investment and state-led growth. However, Bo's critics called the model of "red GDP" – subsidized infrastructure, housing and public works projects – unsustainable and a drain on the city's budget. Some civil servants complained that they were not getting salaries on time. Chongqing received a disproportionately high share (some US$34 billion) of stimulus money from Beijing in 2008. Political rivals such as Bo's predecessor Wang Yang also suggested that economic figures in Chongqing were "rigged"—artificially inflated through unnecessary construction and public works projects.

=== Leadership style ===
Although many of Bo's campaigns earned popular support, especially from the city's poor, his leadership style has been described as "propagandistic", "ruthless", and "arrogant" by subordinates and city officials, academics, journalists, and other professionals. He cultivated a casual and charismatic image in a marked departure from Chinese political convention. Michael Wines of The New York Times wrote that although Bo was possessed of "prodigious charisma and deep intelligence", these qualities were offset by a "studied indifference to the wrecked lives that littered his path to power. ... Mr. Bo's ruthlessness stood out, even in a system where the absence of formal rules ensures that only the strongest advance." Bo placed onerous demands on government officials in the city, requiring them to be available to work all day and all night, seven days a week. He reportedly called subordinates to late-night meetings, publicly criticized and humiliated those with whom he disagreed, and even hit underlings who failed to meet his demands. According to a psychologist quoted by the Daily Telegraph, since Bo Xilai assumed power, "depression, burn out and suicides have all risen among officials. ... Officials now make up the largest share of patients [seeking] counselling in the city."

In late 2009, a popular investigative television show on China Central Television aired a critical story on Bo's anti-crime drive, expressing concern over the apparent disregard for legal due process. In response, Bo used his connections to have the show's host temporarily banned from the airwaves, and its producer moved to another program. Others who opposed Bo's initiatives were also met with retribution. Li Zhuang, a defense lawyer from Beijing, was sentenced to two and a half years in prison (later reduced to 18 months) in 2009 for attempting to defend one of the high-profile targets of Bo's crackdown. Cheng Li, a scholar at the Brookings Institution, said that "Nobody really trusts [Bo]: a lot of people are scared of him, including several princelings who are supposed to be his power base."

=== Alleged eavesdropping operations ===
As part of Bo's efforts to fight crime and maintain social and political stability in Chongqing, he initiated a major electronic surveillance operation. Wang Lijun, Chongqing's police chief, served as the architect of the state-funded project, which was described in official media as a "comprehensive package bugging system covering telecommunications to the Internet." The system involved wiretaps, eavesdropping, and monitoring of internet communications, and was designed with the help of cybersecurity expert Fang Binxing, known for his pivotal role in the construction of China's Great Firewall.

According to The New York Times, the eavesdropping operations did not only target local criminals, but also the communications of top Chinese leaders, including Hu Jintao. One source connected to the Chinese leadership said that Bo tried to monitor nearly all central leaders who had visited Chongqing to better understand what they thought of him. In August 2011, a phone call between Hu Jintao and anti-corruption official Ma Wen was found to be wiretapped under Bo's orders. The revelations about the eavesdropping operation resulted in intense scrutiny from the Central Commission for Discipline Inspection. It was also said to have sowed distrust and played a role in the falling out of Bo and his police chief Wang Lijun, who allegedly began to use the same eavesdropping methods against Bo himself. The operations were believed to have contributed to Bo's downfall in 2012.

=== Death of Neil Heywood ===
On 14 November 2011, British citizen Neil Heywood was found dead in his Chongqing hotel room. At the time, local authorities declared he had died from alcohol over-consumption. The official cause of death was not scrutinized until several months later, when revelations emerged that Heywood's death was a homicide, and Bo Xilai was implicated.

Heywood, a businessman and fixer for Western companies in China, was first introduced to the Bo family in 2004, Bo Guagua's third year at Harrow School, as the only alumnus living in Dalian. Even though it was confirmed that Fido Vivien-May, a volunteer at Royal British Legion whom Gu Kailai had met through Bo Guagua's language school in Bournemouth, introduced and helped Bo Guagua's application to Harrow School, after Bo Xilai's fall, it was widely misreported that Heywood helped with Bo Guagua's admission to the school, when Heywood in fact did not know them at the time.

Heywood was widely believed to be a middleman for the Bo family, helping them move and manage properties overseas, in exchange for their political influence in facilitating his business activities in China. In October 2011, Heywood reportedly had a business dispute with Gu, which escalated when Heywood threatened to reveal the family's business dealings and "destroy" Bo Guagua, who was studying in the US. Heywood was then poisoned by Gu and her aide Zhang Xiaojun.

In August 2012, Gu was convicted of the murder and receive a suspended death sentence, which was commuted to life imprisonment in 2015. Meanwhile, Zhang was sentenced to nine years' jail for acting as an accomplice in the poisoning. His sentence was reduced by a total of 26 months on three occasions—in 2014, 2015, and 2017—due to good behavior, which scheduled his release for May 2019. However, he was released earlier, at an unknown date no later than January 2018, as he joined the Bo family at a memorial event for Bo Yibo at the Babaoshan Revolutionary Cemetery in Beijing on January 17, 2018.

== Downfall ==
In early 2012, Bo visited the Fourteenth Army Group, which his father had helped found in the late 1930s. The visit was alleged to have violated civil-military non-fraternization policies and was viewed by some as evidence of Bo's political ambitions.

=== Wang Lijun incident ===
In early 2012, the party's Central Commission for Discipline Inspection bolstered its presence within Chongqing as the city's leaders came under investigation. Much of the attention focused on Bo's police chief, Wang Lijun, who may have been under investigation for his role in a corruption case in Liaoning. Growing scrutiny over the city's wiretapping operation against senior leaders also likely fell mainly on Wang. Although details are scarce, several sources have suggested that Wang's resentment against Bo grew amidst the investigations—resentment that was compounded when Wang realized that he and his wife had also been targets of wiretapping under Bo's orders.

Moreover, Wang was privy to details of Neil Heywood's death, and had reportedly attempted to voice his concerns to Bo. Around 16 January, Wang is believed to have confronted Bo over evidence that implicated Bo's wife in the murder. Although Bo initially agreed to allow an inquiry, he then changed course and sought to obstruct investigations. Wang was abruptly demoted on 2 February to the less powerful position of vice-mayor overseeing education, science, and environmental affairs. Bo placed Wang under surveillance, and several of his close associates were reportedly taken into custody. Some reports allege that Bo may have been plotting to have Wang assassinated.

On 6 February 2012, apparently fearing for his life, Wang traveled to the U.S. consulate in the nearby city of Chengdu, bringing evidence implicating Bo and his family in the Neil Heywood murder. Wang sought and was denied asylum in the United States. He remained in the consulate for approximately 24 hours before leaving "of his own volition" and being taken into the custody of state security officials dispatched from Beijing. Local media in Chongqing announced that Wang was on a "vacation-style medical treatment."

A day after Wang's leave, several overseas Chinese-language news websites posted an open letter allegedly penned by Wang, which sharply criticized Bo as a "hypocrite" and "the greatest gangster in China" and accused Bo of corruption. Without knowing what incriminating material Wang may have held against Bo, even Bo's supporters in China's top leadership were reluctant to vouch for him. Bo responded in an unusually open press conference during the 2012 National People's Congress, acknowledging "negligent supervision" of his subordinates, saying he may have "relied upon the wrong person".

=== Removal from posts ===
On 15 March 2012, Bo was dismissed as Chongqing party secretary and its related municipal posts, while temporarily retaining a seat on the Politburo. Due to the potentially destructive effects Bo's dismissal would have on party unity, party elders were consulted on the matter. The decision was reportedly made at a meeting of the Politburo Standing Committee, which Bo had been expected to gain a position on in the future, on 7 March. Secretary of the CPLC Zhou Yongkang cast a lone dissenting vote. On 14 March, Bo was reprimanded by Premier Wen Jiabao during the Premier's annual press conference. Wen called the achievements of Chongqing "significant", but the result of "multiple administrations", i.e., not just Bo himself. Wen also made numerous allusions to the damage wrought by the Cultural Revolution, an indirect rebuke of Bo's efforts to revive "red culture". Addressing high-level political changes by a Premier to an open public forum was unprecedented. Political observers believe that Wen's remarks and Bo's downfall represented a consensus within the central leadership that Bo not only needed to shoulder the responsibility for the Wang Lijun scandal, but also represented a political triumph for the 'liberal reformer' wing of the Communist Party.

On 10 April 2012, Bo was suspended from the CCP Central Committee and Politburo, pending investigation for "serious disciplinary violations". Bo's wife, Gu Kailai, was named a prime suspect in the inquiry into the death of British businessman Neil Heywood. The announcement, carrying criminal implications, was the death knell for Bo's political career.

On 28 September 2012, the Politburo of the Chinese Communist Party adopted a decision to expel him from the party. The decision was ratified by a full plenary session of the Central Committee on 4 November. He was accused of major disciplinary violations and corruption charges during his tenure in Dalian, the Ministry of Commerce and Chongqing, including in relation to the Gu Kailai case. On 26 October 2012, the Standing Committee of the 11th National People's Congress expelled him as a deputy to the national legislature, removing his final public post and setting the stage for his trial.

=== Public reactions ===
Bo's downfall elicited strong reactions among the Chinese public and with commentators across the political spectrum. Leftist websites such as Utopia, Red China, and Maoflag were full of angry commentary over Bo's dismissal. These websites were shut down for a period of "maintenance" shortly after. Leftist commentators voiced support for Bo: Kong Qingdong called Bo's dismissal "a plot by enemies of the state"; Sima Nan said associating Bo with the Cultural Revolution was a "smear campaign"; Sima's pro-Bo microblogs were censored. Large numbers of sympathetic posts for Bo appeared in microblogs from Chongqing, and Dalian, where Bo was once mayor. The nationalist tabloid Global Times also wrote a sympathetic editorial. Liberal media reacted positively, believing Bo's style of "personality-based rule" was dangerous and regressive, and claiming his downfall signified a "correct orientation" to China's future development. The liberal Nanfang Daily Newspaper Group editor Yan Lieshan remarked that Bo correctly identified China's problems but prescribed the wrong solution. Businesspeople whose assets were seized by Bo's administration in Chongqing also reacted positively.

Bo's dismissal caused political shockwaves unseen since the Tiananmen Square protests of 1989, and exposing internal conflicts within the Communist Party. In the weeks following 15 March, party authorities deliberated on Bo's case. In the absence of official reports of the proceedings, microblogs churned out a flood of speculation, including rumours of a coup. In response, the authorities instructed newspapers and websites to strictly report only official releases, and arrested six people accused of "rumourmongering".

Aware of its potentially divisive impact, authorities carefully controlled media coverage of Bo's removal from office. State media reported 'pledges of loyalty' to the party's decision to disgrace Bo, including statements from the new Chongqing party authorities, Beijing municipal organs, and grassroots party members rallying to the party line. The party's mouthpiece People's Daily issued a front-page editorial calling for unity behind the "correct decision". The military held 'political education' sessions on short notice, stressing unity and loyalty to the Party under the leadership of Hu Jintao. Bo's downfall also affected his ally Zhou Yongkang, who had reportedly relinquished his operational control over Chinese security institutions and lost the right to influence who would succeed him at the 18th Party Congress.

=== Trial ===
In July 2013, Chinese prosecution authorities charged Bo with bribery, abuse of power and corruption, paving the way for his trial. In the build-up to the trial, Song Yangbiao, a prominent leftist supporter of Bo was detained by police after he urged people to protest against the trial. The verdict and sentence brought to close one of the most lurid political scandals in the history of China under Communist rule. A few days before the trial, Wang Xuemei, a prominent forensic scientist who was vice director of the Chinese Forensic Medicine Association and of the Supreme Court's Prosecutorial Research Center, resigned from her positions. Wang had publicly questioned the forensic evidence used in the trial of Bo's wife Gu Kailai. Defense counsel for Bo was Beijing-based DeHeng Law Offices, a corporate law firm with deep political connections to the state. The Wall Street Journal article on the law firm's role in the trial described it as acting as an "intermediary" that facilitated between Bo, his relatives and prosecutors the negotiation of "an outcome acceptable to all sides in the run-up to the trial—and to help ensure that the trial itself goes according to plan".

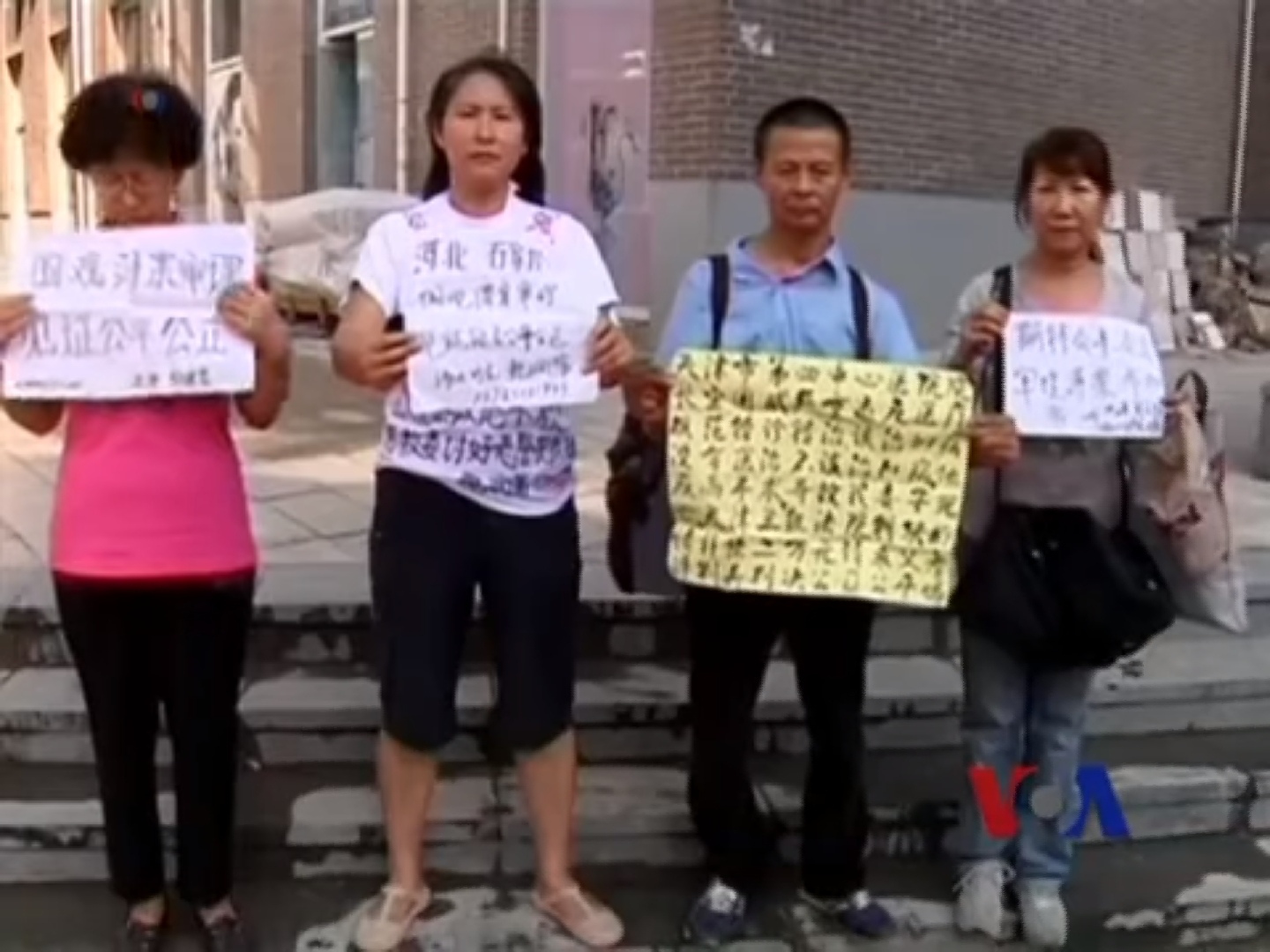
Bo Xilai supporters crowded at Jinan Intermediate People's Court on 21 August 2013

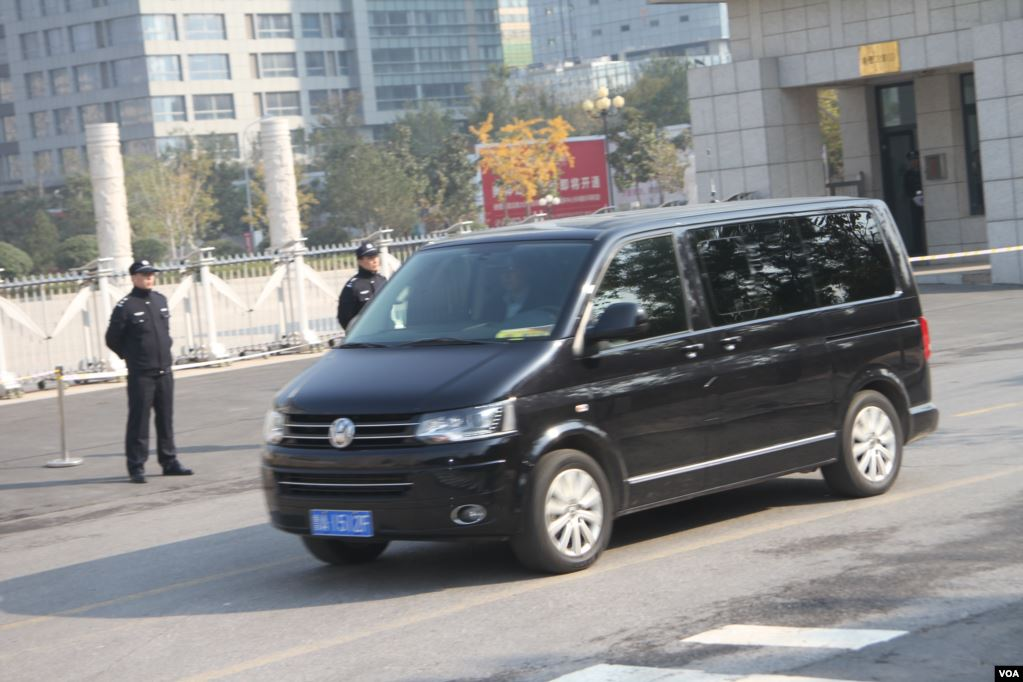
A prison van which escorted Bo, entered Shandong High People's Court on 25 October 2013

Beginning on 22 August 2013, the Jinan Intermediate People's Court heard Bo's case. Bo faced three charges: bribery, abuse of power, and embezzlement. The prosecutors alleged that Bo received the equivalent of some 21.79 million yuan (US$3.56 million) in bribes from businessmen Xu Ming and Tang Xiaolin. At the trial Xu testified that he gave Bo's wife Gu Kailai $3.23 million in 2000 to buy the villa Fontaine St-Georges in Nice, France, and that he paid for their son Bo Guagua's travel and credit card bills. Bo Xilai cross-examined Xu and denied knowledge of many of the payments. Bo's trial also featured a testy exchange between Bo and his former lieutenant Wang Lijun, during which Bo claimed that his knowledge of Wang's crush on Gu was the real reason for Wang's defection to the U.S. consulate.

The proceedings of the trial were relayed in real time via the court's Weibo account, but parts of Bo's testimony, particularly those regarding the threats and mistreatment he experienced during the investigation and his emotional remarks about his wife, were censored. Some details omitted from the trial transcript on Weibo include Bo's testimony that he had been interrogated hundreds of times and had fainted 27 times, and that he had confessed to one bribery charge the previous year only after being warned that his wife could face the death penalty and his son, Bo Guagua, who had just graduated from Harvard University, could be issued a Red Notice and brought back to China. "I felt like there were two other lives tethered to mine," Bo said.

Eventually, at his trial, Bo recanted a series of confessions he had made during the investigation, denying all charges against him. On 22 September, the court found him guilty on all counts, including accepting bribes and abuses of power, stripped him of all his personal assets, and sentenced him to life imprisonment.

=== Aftermath ===
Not long after the trial, on 6 November, activist Wang Zheng established the Zhi Xian Party, which supports Communist Party rule but criticizes it failing to uphold the constitution. Bo Xilai was elected the party's "Chairman for life". Beijing Municipal Civil Affairs Bureau banned Zhi Xian Party on 2 December 2013 and Wang Zheng was arrested in 2017.

Chinese authorities attempted but failed to confiscate Bo's €6.95 million villa in Cannes, a key piece of evidence in his bribery charges, which had been purchased by Xu Ming and held by Xu's girlfriend, former CCTV host Jiang Feng Dolby, a British citizen, as an intermediary for the Bo family. The villa was sold in 2015, but the identities of both the seller and the buyer remain unknown.

After Bo's fall, Xi Jinping's accession to power resulted in a series of major political changes with significant consequences. Bo's former supporter Zhou Yongkang retired in 2012, but was caught up in Xi Jinping's anti-corruption dragnet in 2013, detained for investigation, and eventually sentenced to life in prison. In addition, Zhou was unable to select the successor to his office, possibly as a result of his role in the Bo Xilai scandal. The head of the Central Political and Legal Affairs Commission, which Zhou headed, no longer held a seat on the Politburo Standing Committee following the 18th Party Congress, as the number of seats on the body were reduced from nine to seven. The anti-corruption campaign following the 18th Party Congress became the biggest of its kind in the history of China under Communist rule. By 2014, Bo had been branded by some media outlets outside of China as part of a so-called "New Gang of Four" composed of disgraced officials Zhou Yongkang, Xu Caihou, and Ling Jihua.

Bo's chief ideological rival, former Guangdong party secretary Wang Yang, went on to become Vice-Premier in 2013 and eventually joined the Politburo Standing Committee in 2017, the party's top leadership council. Wen Jiabao, who was seen as Bo's foremost critic in the top leadership, suffered significant public embarrassment himself over a New York Times article about his family's vast empire of wealth whose release coincided closely with Bo's dismissal. Huang Qifan, the mayor of Chongqing long seen as an ally of Bo, continued serving in his position as Mayor of Chongqing until his resignation in 2016. Wang Lijun was sentenced to fifteen years in prison for defection, corruption, and abuse of power.

Since the trial, Bo has been interned at Qincheng Prison. According to the South China Morning Post in 2019, Bo enjoys practicing his calligraphy in letters to the authorities seeking to get his case reopened. It also added that Bo was active in group activities, and was permitted to wear a Western suit instead of a prison uniform, though plastic shoes are still mandatory as any shoes or trousers with laces or drawstrings are not allowed inside the prison to prevent suicides.

== Political alignment and affiliations ==
In the course of his career, Bo Xilai was the beneficiary of considerable patronage from former Communist Party general secretary Jiang Zemin. He is thus associated with Jiang's faction, sometimes referred to as the "elitists", that is generally known to favor a model that emphasizes free trade, economic development in the coastal regions, and export-led growth. It is a coalition composed largely of "princelings" (the children of high-ranking former party leaders), business people, leaders of coastal cities, and members of the erstwhile "Shanghai clique". By contrast, the "populist" coalition of Hu Jintao and Wen Jiabao advocated more balanced economic development and improvements to China's social safety net. The populist faction comprised rural leaders, socialist intellectuals, and several leaders who rose to prominence through their connections with the Communist Youth League.

While Bo was initially identified with the elitist bloc during his time in Liaoning and as Minister of Commerce, during his tenure in the interior city of Chongqing, he adopted a number of populist policies typically associated with the conservative left. Namely, he implemented social housing programs, gave residency status (and therefore the associated social welfare benefits) to rural migrant workers, and emphasized a need for a more balanced distribution of wealth. Although Bo relentlessly pursued technology, capital, and business opportunities, he also spearheaded a large number of government programs to help the working class and disadvantaged groups. Bo's campaigns against corruption also allegedly seized the assets of private entrepreneurs, in turn allegedly funneling these funds into his own personal wealth, as well as (more publicly) state projects and welfare programs, effectively re-asserting state control over wealth. He also sought to promote "red culture", and mandated the revival of Mao-era slogans and songs, evoking memories that were romantic to the conservative left, but painful to the liberal right of Chinese politics.

Bo's policies in Chongqing ultimately made him a prominent figure among neo-Maoists and leftists, and a representative of the conservative wing of the Communist Party. Although Bo did not favor the discontinuation of market economics or a return to Mao-era policies, he was seen to advocate a strong role for the state in peoples' lives. Bo's anti-corruption campaign, in particular, earned him a reputation for heavy-handedness and authoritarian methods in crime and punishment. Bo's policies put him in opposition to the more liberal and reform-oriented faction, particularly Premier Wen Jiabao and Guangdong party secretary Wang Yang, who favored the strengthening of rule of law and a continuation of political reform. To observers, Bo and Wang's verbal jousting over the future direction of development marked an increasing polarization of Chinese politics into leftist and reformer camps.

== Personal life ==
=== Marriages ===
Bo's first wife was Li Danyu, an army surgeon and daughter of the Chinese politician Li Xuefeng. The two met in 1975, when Bo was working as a manual laborer at a factory in Beijing. They wed in September 1976 and had a son the following year, Li Wangzhi. In 1978, the gaokao was reinstated and Bo Xilai was admitted to Peking University, where Gu Kailai was also a student. In 1981 Bo asked for a divorce; Li refused but moved out of their home at Zhongnanhai. The case went to court and the divorce was completed in 1984.

Bo's second wife is Gu Kailai, a prominent lawyer. Bo and Gu were schoolmates at Peking University. Li claims that Bo had an affair with Gu at the time, but Gu states she first met Bo in Dalian in 1984. Gu and Bo married in 1986 and had a son, Bo Guagua, in 1987. Bo and Gu were criticized for using his political influence to benefit her law firm. Jiang Weiping claimed that Gu served as Bo's "gatekeeper" when Bo was the mayor of Dalian, regularly accepting gifts and bribes from those seeking access to him. Bo denied that his wife had profited from his position, saying that she had retired from her legal practice while the couple lived in Dalian in the 1990s. Gu left for Britain with their son in December 1999, partly out of anger after discovering Bo’s affair, and lived there for most of the following years until returning to China in 2007. There was speculation that Bo may have attempted to interfere with a corruption investigation into his wife prior to the Wang Lijun incident, which led to the downfall of the couple.

Bo and Gu's son, Bo Guagua, drew attention for his high-profile and privileged lifestyle. Both Guagua and his father repeatedly denied allegations that Guagua was the "playboy" that he was often portrayed. Asked how he could afford his son's tuition fees on his estimated annual salary of $22,000, Bo replied that his son received "full scholarships" from the respective institutions.

=== Other relationships ===
Bo has a reputation as a womanizer. In September 2012, Xinhua News Agency's official announcement of Bo's expulsion from the CCP cited, among other charges, that "Bo had affairs and maintained improper sexual relationships with a number of women." One of Bo's best known mistresses is Zhang Weijie, a Dalian TV hostess, who disappeared in the late 1990s, sparking rumors and urban legends, including speculation that Gu murdered and plastinated her after Zhang became pregnant with Bo's child. Jiang Weiping instead claimed that Zhang was forced out of Dalian by Gu and financially compensated by Wu Wenkang, Bo's secretary at the time, after which she studied at the Beijing Film Academy and eventually emigrated overseas.

Bo was romantically linked to actress Ma Xiaoqing, who had admitted in interviews prior to Bo's fall that she had been in a relationship with a high-ranking official. In 2012, an American website Boxun baselessly reported that movie star Zhang Ziyi was paid $100 million to sleep with Bo and other top Chinese officials, a claim that was widely reposted. Zhang sued Boxun in a US court for defamation. In December 2013, Boxun settled the case with Zhang and issued an apology. Zhang also sued Next Media in Hong Kong and Taiwan over the similar reports by the group's two titles, both citing Boxun. She won the case in Hong Kong but lost in Taiwan.

== Popular culture ==
In the Chinese TV series Uphold Justice in America (2002), based on the book of the same name by Gu Kailai, Bo is played by Pu Cunxin.

In the American film The Laundromat (2019), Bo is played by Jesse Wang. The film is banned in China, with its Douban page removed before its release in 2019.

== See also ==
- Politics of Liaoning
- Politics of Chongqing

Party political offices
Preceded by Wang Yang	Party Secretary of Chongqing; 2007–2012	Succeeded by Zhang Dejiang
Preceded by Yu Xuexiang	Party Secretary of Dalian; 1999–2001	Succeeded by Sun Chunlan
Government offices
Preceded by Zhang Guoguang	Governor of Liaoning; 2003–2004; Acting 2001–2003	Succeeded by Zhang Wenyue
Preceded by Lü Fuyuan	Minister of Commerce; 2004–2007	Succeeded by Chen Deming
