= Ding zui =

Chinese term for hiring impostor to receive punishment

Ding zui (Chinese: 顶罪; pinyin: dǐngzuì) is the Chinese practice of hiring impostors or body doubles to stand trial and receive punishment in one's place. The term translates as "substitute criminal," and is reported to be a relatively common practice among China's wealthy elite.

Accusations of ding zui surfaced in 2012 during the trial of Gu Kailai. The term "body double" (替身, "body replacement") quickly became popular on Chinese Internet fora, and Chinese authorities attempted to censor related messages. Similar allegations had arisen in 2009 after the trial of one Hu Bin.
