= Bo Guagua =

Second son of former Chinese politician Bo Xilai

- 薄瓜瓜
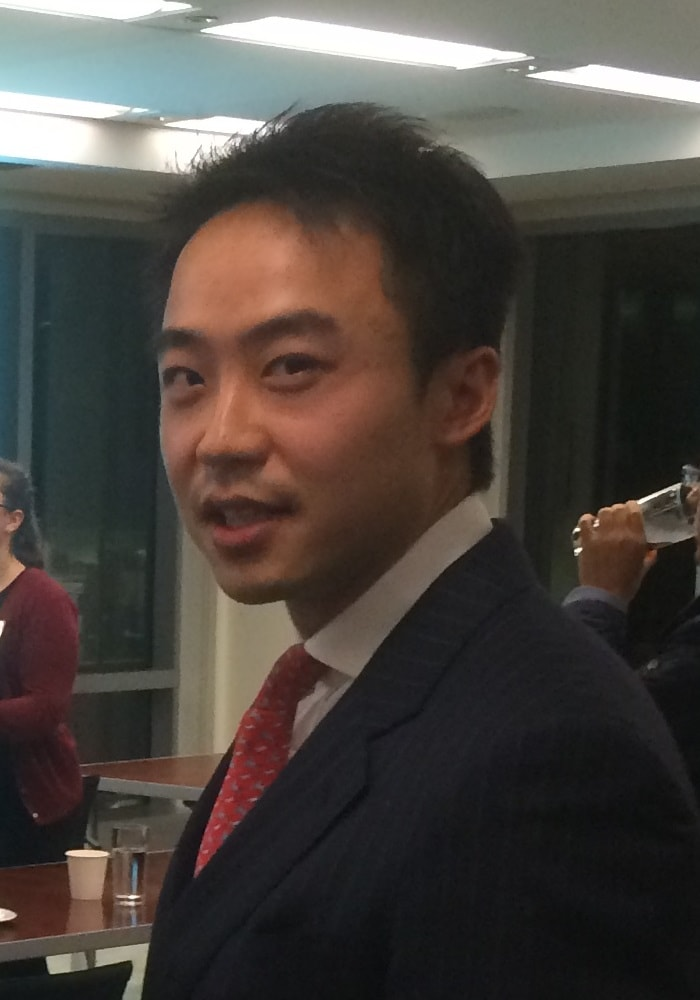
- Bo in 2015
- Born: Kuangyi Bo; 17 December 1987 (age 38); Beijing, China
- Other names: Bo Jinggua (薄京瓜), Bo Guagua (薄瓜瓜)
- Education: Harrow School; Balliol College, Oxford (BA); Harvard University (MPP); Columbia University (JD)
- Occupation: Businessman
- Spouse: Deffany Hsu (m. 2024)
- Parents: Bo Xilai (father); Gu Kailai (mother)
- Relatives: Bo family

Chinese name
- Simplified Chinese: 薄旷逸
- Traditional Chinese: 薄曠逸
Transcriptions
Standard Mandarin
- Hanyu Pinyin: Bó Kuàngyì

Bo Guagua
- Chinese: 薄瓜瓜
Transcriptions
Standard Mandarin
- Hanyu Pinyin: Bó Guāguā

Bo Kuangyi (born 17 December 1987), more commonly known as Bo Guagua, is a Chinese businessman and lawyer. The second son of Bo Xilai and the only child of Gu Kailai, he attracted media attention for his family background and lifestyle, often being described as a "red aristocrat" and "playboy". Since his parents were arrested in 2012, he has lived in exile and kept a low profile.

== Family ==
Bo was born in Beijing to a prominent family as Kuangyi, a name bestowed by his paternal grandfather, Bo Yibo, meaning "a remarkable talent of many ages". He goes by Guagua, meaning "watermelon", initially a nickname given by his maternal grandfather, Gu Jingsheng.

Bo's father, Bo Xilai, was a high-profile Chinese Communist Party (CCP) official and Politburo member until his removal from office in 2012. Bo's mother, Gu Kailai, aka Horus L. Kai, was a lawyer who was convicted of homicide in 2012. Both of his parents hail from prominent political families that were persecuted during the Cultural Revolution. His paternal grandfather, Bo Yibo, was a revolutionary leader and one of the Eight Elders of the CCP. His paternal grandmother, Hu Ming, according to him, was "beaten to death" during the Cultural Revolution, while the official history states that she committed suicide. His maternal grandfather, Gu Jingsheng, was a leader of the December 9th Movement and a PLA general. His maternal grandmother, Fan Chengxiu, was a descendant of the renowned Song dynasty scholar-official, Fan Zhongyan.

Bo has a half brother Brendan Li Wangzhi (李望知), born Bo Wangzhi (薄望知), from his father's first marriage to Li Danyu, an army surgeon and daughter of the Chinese politician Li Xuefeng. Brendan obtained his LLB degree from Peking University Law School, master's degree from Columbia University's School of International and Public Affairs, and is now a businessman in China.

== Biography ==
As a child, Bo was raised by his maternal grandparents in Beijing. His mother, Gu Kailai, spent most of her time in Dalian, where his father, Bo Xilai, served as mayor, only returning to Beijing when Guagua was ill. He attended Beijing Jingshan School from elementary school through Grade 7, before withdrawing to prepare for studies in the UK. The decision to study abroad was partly inspired by his cousin, the daughter of Gu's eldest sister, who was studying in the UK at the time, and partly driven by Gu's desire to retaliate for Xilai's extramarital affair by taking Guagua away.

In early 1998, during Guagua's winter break, his mother took him on a visit to the UK to explore the educational opportunities, along with Dalian businessman Xu Ming and Taiwanese American businessman Larry Cheng, at Xu's expenses. They toured Harrow School and Oxford University. In December 1999, Gu went to the UK again with Bo, settling in Bournemouth, where Bo attended Dorset International College, a now defunct language school recommended by his cousin, while Gu rented an apartment in Keystone House near the coast. They met through the language school a volunteer from the Royal British Legion, Fido Vivien-May, who introduced Bo to Harrow School, but Bo's first application was rejected.

After completing a year at Papplewick School in 2000, Bo applied to Harrow School again and received a conditional offer, requiring him to pass the Common Entrance Examination with specific scores. Bo excelled, achieving six A's and one B in Latin. It was widely reported Bo was the first Chinese citizen at Harrow.

After six years at Harrow, in 2006, Bo enrolled at Balliol College, Oxford, where he studied Philosophy, Politics and Economics. He had an active social life and joined the Oxford University Conservative Association. In his second year he ran unsuccessfully for the position of librarian in the Oxford Union, a debating society. In his third year, which would have been the last for the 3-year PPE programme, Bo was "rusticated" (suspended) for one year for academic underperformance. The Daily Telegraph reported that three Chinese diplomats, including the Chinese Ambassador to the UK, went to see Dr. Andrew Graham, the Master of Balliol College, and sought to have the rustication revoked, explaining that Bo's academic probation would be a source of embarrassment to "his father and grandfather" in China (even though his grandfather, Bo Yibo, had died by the time), but their request was denied. Graham denied that any Chinese diplomat had visited him; he admitted that they had visited Bo's tutors, but denied any pressure either.

As he was required to be out of residence during his rustication, Bo moved into the 5-star Randolph Hotel, Oxford. He then took another gap year in 2009, according to him, to be back to China with his mother who was critically ill. In the year absent from Oxford, he became active as a public figure in China, including making a high-profile speech at Peking University. After a year's delay in his graduation, Bo returned to Oxford to take his final examinations, obtaining an Upper Second-Class Honours degree in Philosophy, Politics, and Economics. When he graduated in 2010, Bo's Oxford tutors declined to provide him with recommendations for his application to Harvard University. He was nonetheless admitted to the Master's program in Public Policy at the John F. Kennedy School of Government, graduating in May 2012. From 2013 to 2016, he pursued a JD degree at Columbia Law School.

After graduating from the law school, Bo has lived in Canada. Since his parents' arrests in 2012, he has never returned to China, but his passport was renewed by the Chinese government in 2016. From late 2016 to early 2021, he worked as a business analyst for the Power Corporation owned by the Desmarais family, who have maintained close ties to the Bo family. He currently serves as an advisor to Power Sustainable Capital of Canada and a partner of Ginkgo Lake LLC, a Boston investment manager.

== Personal life ==
At Oxford, Bo dated Lale Can Gözübüyük, a Turkish student who now works in finance. They organized a ball featuring a performance by DJ Tim Westwood and a speech by Jackie Chan.

From around 2010 to late 2011, Bo was in a relationship with Sabrina Chen Xiaodan, the granddaughter of Chen Yun. In 2011, over 400 photos of the couple, taken during their trip to Tibet in the summer of 2010, surfaced online. The photos showed them receiving VIP-level treatment, including police motorcades escorting them throughout Tibet. Sabrina broke up with Bo several months before his father, Bo Xilai, was arrested.

After 8 years of dating, Bo married Deffany Hsu Hui-yü, his schoolmate at Columbia University and the granddaughter of Hsu Wen-cheng, a Kuomintang politician and the founder of Luodong Bo-ai Hospital in Yilan County, Taiwan. The couple held a wedding banquet in Hsinchu County, Taiwan in November 2024. At the wedding, he paid tribute to his parents for "making sacrifices for the people and the greater good" and "endur[ing] fabricated crimes with grace."

== Controversies ==
=== Public image ===
Bo first rose to public attention in May 2006 when Esquire China published a feature titled Bo Guagua: PPE and a London Accent, highlighting his British education since the age of 11, his skills in horseback riding, fencing, rugby, tango dancing, as well as his English book Uncommon Wealth, "an experimental work composed of English text, illustrations, poetry, and manifestos" published when he was 17. Since then, unlike most children of party leaders who maintain a low profile, Bo cultivated a highly public persona, often described as a "red aristocrat" or "playboy". His Westernized and privileged lifestyle stood in stark contrast to his father's efforts to revive a "red culture" in Chongqing, which included promoting revolutionary songs and Maoist slogans. When Bo Xilai was suspended from his party positions, party leaders cited the younger Bo's behavior as one of the contributing factors. Bo's playboy lifestyle, widely reported in the international press, has been a source of embarrassment for the Communist Party leadership in Beijing.

=== Funding ===
There had been much public speculation about how Bo was able to go to private schools in the UK and the US on his father's salary of $20,000 per year. The private Harrow School he attended costs $48,000 per year; then Oxford University's tuition alone costs about $25,000 per year; Harvard University's Kennedy School requires about $70,000 a year for both tuition and living expenses. Bo's three-year course at Columbia charges tuition and other fees of more than $60,000 a year, on top of which living expenses have to be factored in.

In April 2012, The Wall Street Journal reported that Bo had been living at a luxury apartment in Cambridge, Massachusetts, at a monthly cost of approximately $2,600. He moved out shortly after his father, Bo Xilai, was arrested. He was also reported to drive a $80,000 black Porsche sports car, having collected violations for running stop signs in December 2010 and May 2011, and for speeding in February 2012. On 24 April 2012, Harvard University school newspaper, The Harvard Crimson, published a statement by Bo, in which he stated that his tuition and living expenses were "funded exclusively by two sources—scholarships earned independently, and my mother's generosity from the savings she earned from her years as a successful lawyer and writer." On the other hand, his father told the Chinese news media that his son was on full scholarship and his wife was a successful lawyer, but she was afraid of people spreading rumors, so she had closed down her law office a long time ago. At the trial of Bo Xilai that started on 22 August 2013, businessman Xu Ming testified that he paid for Bo Guagua's travel and credit card bills, although during cross-examination Bo Xilai challenged many of the payments.

=== Red Ferrari ===
In November 2011, The Wall Street Journal reported that Bo had once worn a tuxedo and driven a red Ferrari to pick up one of Jon Huntsman Jr.'s daughters at the U.S. ambassador's residence in Beijing. The newspaper later issued a correction, clarifying that the two had driven together from a group dinner to a bar, rather than Bo picking her up at her home. Despite the correction, the original account—particularly the detail of the red Ferrari—gained widespread circulation in China. Bo and his father, Bo Xilai, along with a subsequent investigation by The New York Times, refuted several aspects of the report, including the claim that Bo had ever driven a Ferrari.
