= Life imprisonment in China =

Life imprisonment is one of the five principal punishments stipulated under Article 33 of the Criminal Law of the People's Republic of China. According to the Criminal Law, there are 87 offences that may be punishable by life imprisonment.

Life imprisonment also entails lifelong deprivation of political rights. If the sentence is commuted, the deprivation of political rights is reduced to a period of three to ten years (Article 57). The statute of limitations for prosecution is 20 years for crimes for which the maximum penalty prescribed by law is life imprisonment. Under special circumstances, this period may be extended with the approval of the Supreme People's Procuratorate (Article 87, paragraph 4).

If no intentional crime is committed during the probation period following a suspended death sentence, the punishment shall automatically be commuted to life imprisonment or to a fixed-term imprisonment of twenty-five years (Article 50). Life imprisonment may be commuted, but the actual period of imprisonment shall not be less than 13 years. If a suspended death sentence is commuted to life imprisonment, the actual period of imprisonment shall not be less than 25 years (Article 78). The actual time served is calculated based on the commutation decision (Article 80).

Article 78 of the Criminal Law also sets out the conditions for commutation. A person sentenced to life imprisonment who has served more than 13 years may be released on parole under certain conditions. However, recidivists and other serious violent offenders sentenced to life imprisonment are not eligible for parole (Article 81). The probation period for parole in cases of life imprisonment is 10 years (Article 83). In cases of corruption where the death penalty is suspended, the court may impose life imprisonment without the possibility of commutation or parole after the expiry of the suspension period.

On November 15, 2016, the Supreme People's Court issued the Provisions on the Specific Application of Laws in Handling Cases of Commutation and Parole, which stipulate that any prisoner convicted of corruption or bribery and sentenced to life imprisonment shall not be eligible for commutation or parole. This regulation came into effect on January 1, 2017.

Although life imprisonment is not a mandatory punishment under Chinese law, the following crimes may carry a sentence of life imprisonment:

== Arson ==
Arson is regarded as an extremely serious offence in China and may result in life imprisonment or the death penalty. The crime of arson is classified under "offences endangering public safety" in Article 106 of the Criminal Law of the People's Republic of China. According to the Criminal Law, anyone who causes serious injury, death, or significant damage to public or private property through arson, flooding, explosions, poisoning, or other dangerous means may be sentenced to a fixed-term imprisonment of ten years or more, life imprisonment, or the death penalty.

In February 2018, Mo Huanjing, a nanny in the city of Hangzhou, was found guilty of intentionally setting fire to her employer's apartment, which resulted in the deaths of a mother and her three children. She was sentenced to death. According to the BBC, Mo had accumulated significant gambling debts and intended to rescue the victims from the fire in order to gain their trust and later request a loan from the family. The victims' husband and father was away on business at the time of the incident.

In June 1995, Lin Shuqiang was executed in Zhuhai County, Guangdong Province, after being convicted of arson and robbery, according to Amnesty International's China: Death Penalty Record: January–June 1995 report. In the same report, Wei Dirong, a resident of Shaanxi Province, was also reported to have been executed in June 1995 for setting fire to equipment, while Chen Xiaoming was executed in February 1995 in Dongtai County, Jiangsu Province, for setting fire to a man's house, resulting in the deaths of the man's parents.

In August 2005, two employees of a relocation company in Shanghai were sentenced to death with a two-year reprieve, while a third was sentenced to life imprisonment. The three were convicted of setting fires to intimidate residents who refused to vacate their homes, which resulted in the deaths of two people.

== Murder ==
China retains the use of the death penalty. With the country's transition to a market economy, many crimes previously punishable by death have gradually been reduced to life imprisonment. Murder is included among crimes that place another person's life in grave danger and may therefore be subject to capital punishment. However, as Chinese society has developed, the death penalty has increasingly been replaced with life imprisonment.

In many cases, individuals sentenced to death for murder may have their sentences commuted to suspended or life imprisonment, depending on judicial discretion and broader socio-economic considerations. Offenders who do not commit intentional crimes during the two-year suspension period may have their sentences commuted to life imprisonment, while those who make significant contributions may have their punishment reduced to a fixed-term imprisonment.

Murder in China has traditionally been classified as a crime punishable by either death or life imprisonment. Since the early 1980s, the application of the death penalty has changed significantly. The Criminal Law of the People's Republic of China (1997) extended the death penalty to offences related to public safety, economic order, and corruption. Crimes such as terrorism, hijacking, and illegal possession of firearms are considered crimes endangering public safety under this legislation.

Offenders under the age of 18 who commit murder are subject to a maximum penalty of life imprisonment without the possibility of parole. Chinese law permits a form of life imprisonment that can be converted into life imprisonment without parole under certain circumstances. While life imprisonment is a legal penalty for a wide range of offences committed by adults, individuals aged between 14 and 18 at the time of committing a crime that would otherwise be punishable by life imprisonment may also receive a life sentence.

According to Article 82, Paragraph 2 of the Criminal Law of the People's Republic of China, "recidivists and criminals who have been sentenced to fixed-term imprisonment of more than ten years or life imprisonment for violent crimes such as homicide, bombing, and robbery shall not be granted parole." This provision restricts parole eligibility for certain violent offenders. In China, parole is granted under specific legal and behavioural conditions.

== Corruption ==
Efforts to combat corruption in China are conducted on two simultaneous fronts. On one hand, corruption remains a serious challenge for both the government and the Chinese Communist Party (CCP), as it not only causes the loss of public assets but also undermines the legitimacy of the regime. On the other hand, when compared with certain other countries, the overall level of corruption in China is not considered exceptionally severe.

The central government faces limitations in investigating the majority of officials, particularly senior ones. As a result, authorities often impose severe punishments on senior officials who are found guilty of corruption. Although this selective enforcement may reduce public confidence in anti-corruption efforts, it also demonstrates that even high-ranking officials face uncertainty and may not always escape punishment.

The current Criminal Law of the People's Republic of China has been amended to include life imprisonment without the possibility of commutation or parole for those convicted of particularly serious cases of corruption and bribery. This provision applies specifically to offenders originally eligible for the death penalty. While there remains debate among legal scholars regarding the nature, scope, and application of this punishment, the establishment of life imprisonment without parole is viewed as a means to reduce public reliance on the death penalty and to gradually promote its abolition.

Corruption has long been a persistent issue in Chinese society. Structural factors such as the one-party system and certain socio-economic conditions have contributed to opportunities for corruption among government officials. In response, the Chinese government has increased the severity of punishments, with bribery of public officials now listed among offences that may result in life imprisonment.

Research has shown that corruption in China often involves extensive networks of government officials, banking insiders, and criminal enterprises. This problem is particularly evident in cases of financial fraud. Despite China's strict legal framework, such measures have not always led to greater effectiveness in combating bank fraud. The deterrent effect of anti-fraud laws depends on consistent enforcement and predictable punishment. Political, legal, and ideological disparities also pose challenges to China's efforts to pursue fugitives who have fled abroad.

A notable example of the imposition of life imprisonment for corruption is the trial of Bo Xilai, former Secretary of the CCP Chongqing Municipal Party Committee. On September 22, 2013, the Jinan Intermediate People's Court sentenced Bo to life imprisonment for accepting bribes totalling 20 million yuan (US$3.3 million) and embezzling approximately 5 million yuan (US$817,000) during his tenure as mayor of Dalian. The court also ordered the permanent confiscation of his property and the deprivation of his political rights.

The CCP leadership characterised Bo Xilai's trial as a straightforward criminal case rather than a political struggle. State media portrayed the verdict as a major achievement in China's anti-corruption campaign. Bo's career is often cited as an example of how corrupt officials in China have historically advanced through the political system despite allegations of misconduct.

== Drug trafficking ==
Since China's economic reform leniency, the shift in punishment can be viewed as the emergence of a more contemporary kind of penal policy inspired by the country's recently implemented "harmonious society" programme.

Drug trafficking in China is a criminal offence that can result in the death penalty, and the country has implemented stringent measures to combat the problem. In accordance with Article 347 of the Criminal Law of the People's Republic of China, individuals found guilty of smuggling, trafficking, transporting, or manufacturing heroin and methamphetamine in quantities exceeding 50 grams but less than 15 grams are subject to fixed-term imprisonment. Those convicted under more serious circumstances may face life imprisonment or the death penalty.

Additionally, individuals found to be in possession of illegal substances face severe punishment in China. According to the findings of various studies, there were 1,508 incidents involving corpse packing. These cases involved 1,541 trafficking routes and 2,028 defendants who were apprehended as corpse packers. Each case's outcome was categorised according to the sentence imposed, which could include imprisonment, life imprisonment, or the death penalty.

The Chinese government selected captured body packers and trafficking routes as the units of analysis because each case could involve multiple routes or offenders. Similarly, because not all criminals were involved in body packing or were sentenced in the same case, a single case could contain information on more than one route or perpetrator. Research has shown that corpse packers apprehended on international routes typically carried larger quantities of drugs, and those caught internationally or across provinces were more likely to conceal drugs in their luggage.

Offenders caught within a province face harsher punishments, including higher rates of life imprisonment, confiscation of property, and deprivation of political rights. These measures reflect China's severe sentencing policies for drug trafficking offences.

== Sources ==
- Criminal Law and Criminal Procedure Law in the People's Republic of China
- Bei Guo, Ying Jiang. (2015). Analyzing the coexistence of emerging transparency and tight political control on Weibo. Journal of International Communication 21:1, pages 78–108.
- Immigration and Refugee Board, & Research Directorate. (1996, March 1). Refworld | China: Information on the penalty for arson in Guangdong Province in cases where the offence pertains to the individual's private residence. Refworld; Canada: Immigration and Refugee Board of Canada. https://www.refworld.org/docid/3ae6ac6744.html
- Jing-Lu, Zhang (2021). "Life Imprisonment System in China". 2021 International Conference on Public Management and Intelligent Society (PMIS). pp. 127–130. doi:10.1109/PMIS52742.2021.00035. ISBN 978-1-6654-3872-8. S2CID 233375809.
