= Neil Heywood =

English businessman (1970–2011)

- Heywood in China
- Born: 20 October 1970; Kensington, London, England, UK
- Died: 14 November 2011 (aged 41); Chongqing, China
- Cause of death: Homicide
- Education: University of Warwick
- Occupations: Consultant; businessman
- Spouse: Wang Lulu
- Children: 2

Neil Heywood (20 October 1970 – 14 November 2011) was an English businessman. The great-grandson of John Barr Affleck, Britain's Consul General in Tianjin from 1935 to 1938, Heywood lived and worked in China from the early 1990s and became associated with the Bo Xilai family. In 2011, he was murdered by Bo's wife Gu Kailai in Chongqing after a business dispute. His death sparked a major political scandal and precipitated Bo's downfall in 2012.

== Personal life ==
Born in 1970, Heywood attended Harrow School, an independent school for boys. He graduated in international relations from the University of Warwick.

Fluent in Chinese, Heywood spent more than a decade in China. He was married to Wang Lulu (王露露), a Chinese national from Dalian, and the couple had two children.

The family lived in a private, tree-lined neighbourhood of villas on the outskirts of Beijing. Heywood drove a second-hand Jaguar S-Type, with a Union Jack bumper sticker.

== Career ==
Heywood served as an intermediary, linking Western companies wishing to do business in China to powerful figures in the Chinese political structure. Heywood ran a company named Heywood Boddington Associates, registered to his mother's house in London. In its filings, it claims to be a "multi-discipline consultancy focusing on serving the interests of UK businesses in the People's Republic of China".

Heywood developed a business relationship with Gu Kailai, a lawyer, businesswoman, and the wife of Bo Xilai. Both Gu and Bo are children of once-prominent members of the Chinese Communist Party. Heywood appears to have played the role of a Bai Shoutao (白手套) or white glove for the Bo family, doing business on their behalf, since, according to Chinese laws and regulations, a prominent party family could not involve themselves directly with financial dealings.

Businessmen have complained that any foreign company wishing to work in Chongqing had to appoint Gu Kailai's law firm, Kailai Law (now Beijing Ang-dao Law), to act on its behalf. Failing to do so would almost certainly result in it being unable to attain required permissions and licences. It has been reported that Kailai Law charged exorbitant fees.

Heywood's clients included Beijing Aston Martin dealerships and Rolls-Royce. He was also hired occasionally by Hakluyt & Company, a consultancy co-founded by a former officer of Britain's Secret Intelligence Service (MI6).

Rumours that Heywood might have been employed as an agent by MI6 have been denied by Foreign Secretary William Hague, an unusual move, as the British government typically refuses to comment on the identity of its agents. The Wall Street Journal later reported they had confirmed, after interviewing former and current British officials and others, that Heywood had since 2009 been regularly supplying information to MI6, although he was not an MI6 employee.

=== Relationship with Bo Xilai and Gu Kailai ===
Heywood had business links with Gu Kailai, the wife of Bo Xilai. He reportedly met the Bo family in Dalian, the northeast metropolis where Bo was mayor from 1994 to 2000. Heywood was then working at a Dalian English language school and helped Bo's youngest son gain admission to Harrow. The Daily Telegraph reports that Heywood and Gu "shared a long and close personal relationship, but were not romantically involved."

Following a corruption investigation in 2007, Gu is said to have become increasingly paranoid. In 2010, she allegedly asked Heywood and other close associates to divorce their spouses and swear allegiance to her.

The Daily Telegraph reported that Gu Kailai testified Heywood was murdered because he demanded £1.4 million in compensation for the return of a half-share of ownership of a £2 million house, originally bought by Gu in 2000, in the hills overlooking Cannes. The court heard Heywood had blackmailed the family and threatened to expose their corrupt ownership of a villa in the French Riviera. As Heywood's relationship with the Bo–Gu family descended into acrimony, Gu stated that Heywood had threatened the safety of Bo's 25-year-old son, Bo Guagua.

== Death ==
On 14 November 2011, Heywood was summoned to Chongqing by Gu Kailai. She sent Zhang Xiaojun (张晓军) to bring him from Beijing to the Nanshan Lijing Holiday Hotel (南山丽景度假酒店). Zhang Xiaojun is described as an 'orderly' in the Bo household. Aged 32, he used to serve as a bodyguard for Bo Yibo. He is also listed as the supervisor of the Guagua Technology Company, belonging to Bo Guagua.

The Nanshan Lijing Holiday Hotel is a secluded, three-star hilltop retreat, also marketed as the Lucky Holiday Hotel. Gu Kailai hosted a banquet there in the past, but according to two sources quoted by The Daily Telegraph, she was not at the scene at the time of Heywood's murder. The hotel is located in and overlooks Nan'an District.

Heywood was found in his hotel room, 26 hours after his death. The cause of death was given as alcohol poisoning. There was no autopsy, and he was cremated days later. Questions were raised later as friends described him as "not a serious drinker" (some reports have his family describing him as "a teetotaler").

An internal Chinese report confirmed that Heywood died from potassium cyanide added to his drink. However, further investigations led to new findings suggesting the death of Heywood was a murder committed by Gu Kailai.

=== Aftermath ===
Wang Lijun, who was the head of Chongqing police department as well as the vice mayor of Chongqing, was in charge of the investigation. According to a CCP internal report, Wang and his lieutenants were said to be under political pressure during the investigations. Soon Wang found the murder was related to Bo, who had been his superior for more than 10 years. After submitting the investigation report to Bo Xilai, Wang was suspended by Bo. Some of the police officers who participated in the investigation were arrested.

In February 2012, Wang fled to the US consulate in Chengdu, precipitating the so-called Wang Lijun incident. On 14 March 2012, the Dalian-based billionaire Xu Ming, a close associate of Bo, disappeared. It was speculated that he was under arrest. Reports suggest Heywood's wife was employed by Xu. On 15 March 2012, Bo was removed from his post of party chief for Chongqing.

On 10 April 2012, Bo was suspended from the Politburo and suspected of being involved in "serious disciplinary violations". The same day, the state-run Xinhua News Agency said that, according to the reinvestigation, the evidence indicated Heywood was a victim of homicide, of which Bo Xilai's wife, Gu Kailai, and Zhang Xiaojun, her bodyguard, were "strongly suspected". Bo was placed under house arrest in Beijing. Gu and Zhang were both arrested.

The Communist Party chief in Nan'an District of Chongqing, Xia Zeliang, was detained for questioning in April 2012. He was arrested and allegedly confessed that he prepared the poison and handed it to an employee of Bo.

On 13 April 2012, Heywood's widow, Wang Lulu, visited the British Embassy in Beijing, and asked for a visa to travel to the UK with her two young children, reportedly concerned that the people who had killed her husband might come after her and her family. The entrance to the family's gated compound in Beijing was guarded by troops from the People's Liberation Army, and police ordered her not to communicate with international journalists.

=== Legal process ===
On 26 July 2012, Gu Kailai was charged with the murder of Neil Heywood. On 9 August 2012, the trial of Gu was held and lasted only one day, as the defendant did not contest the charges. The same day, four policemen, all senior officers from Chongqing, where the UK businessman was killed, were formally accused of covering up the murder of Heywood and indicted.

On 20 August 2012, the verdict was announced. Gu was given a death sentence with reprieve, which means that Gu is likely to face from 14 years to life in jail, as long as she does not commit any additional offences in the next two years. Zhang Xiaojun, a Bo family aide, was sentenced to nine years in jail for his involvement in the murder, which he admitted to. Both Zhang Xiaojun and Gu Kailai declined to exercise their right to an appeal.

Following the verdict, Britain's embassy in China stated that it had welcomed the investigation, adding "[we] consistently made clear to the Chinese authorities that we wanted to see the trials in this case conform to international human rights standards and for the death penalty not to be applied." BBC News commented that "informed observers see the fingerprints of the Communist Party of China all over this outcome", stating that the trial's conclusion was "all too neat and uncannily suited to one particular agenda", that of limiting the scandal's damage.

On 14 December 2015, Gu Kailai's sentence was commuted to life imprisonment. The prison authorities said Gu had expressed repentance and had made no intentional offences during their review. Zhang was released early at an unknown date no later than January 2018.

== See also ==
- Wang Lijun incident
- Corruption in the People's Republic of China
- Chongqing gang trials
