= Shenyang Aerospace University =

University in Shenyang, China

- 沈阳航空航天大学
- Motto: Virtuous, Capable, Brave and Perseverant. (德能并进 勇毅翔远)
- Type: Public
- Established: 1952
- President: Sun Xiaoping (孙小平)
- Undergraduates: 7000
- Postgraduates: 5000
- Doctoral students: 3000
- Location: Shenyang, China
- Campus: Suburban
- Website: www.sau.edu.cn

Shenyang Aerospace University
- Simplified Chinese: 沈阳航空航天大学
- Traditional Chinese: 瀋陽航空航天大學
Transcriptions
Standard Mandarin
- Hanyu Pinyin: Shěnyáng Hángkōng Hángtīan Dàxué

Shenyang Institute of Aeronautical Engineering
- Simplified Chinese: 沈阳航空工业学院
Transcriptions
Standard Mandarin
- Hanyu Pinyin: Shěnyáng hángkōng gōngyè xuéyuàn

Shenyang Aerospace University (SAU), formerly known as Shenyang Institute of Aeronautical Engineering, is a public university in Shenyang, Liaoning, Northeast China. It educates students for supporting the military and civil aviation industries of China.

== History ==
Founded in 1952, the university was initially administered by the Ministry of Aeronautical & Astronautical Industry, and later by the China General Corporation of Aeronautical Industry. Since 1999, SAU has been under the administration of the Liaoning Provincial Government and is the only university owned by the China Industry and Information Technology Ministry and the Liaoning Provincial Government. It is one of the eight universities constructed by the former China National Defence Ministry and local provincial governments. In addition, it is the only university of aeronautical and astronautical engineering in Liaoning Province.

On 18 March 2010 the China Ministry of Education approved the name change from Shenyang Institute of Aeronautical Engineering (SYIAE) to Shenyang Aerospace University (SAU).

== Overview ==
Characterized by aeronautics and astronautics, Shenyang Aerospace University is a multi-disciplinary university, which, while focusing on engineering, also covers such areas as science, liberal arts and management. The university comprises 17 schools, with over 900 lecturers, including 400 professors and associate professors. There are 20,000 full-time students in SAU.
