= The Time Weekly =

Chinese newspaper

The Time Weekly (Chinese: 时代周报; pinyin: shidai zhoubao) is a Chinese weekly newspaper covering current affairs. It is based in Guangzhou, China, and is owned by the Guangdong Publish Group (广东省出版集团). Published every Thursday, it features five sections: politics, review, economy, culture and world.
