= Xu Ming =

Chinese businessman

- 徐明
- Xu Ming took the witness stand at Bo Xilai's trial on 22 August 2013
- Born: April 1971; Dalian, Liaoning, China
- Died: 4 December 2015 (aged 44); Wuhan, Hubei, China
- Education: Master's degree
- Alma mater: Shenyang Aerospace University; Dongbei University of Finance and Economics
- Occupation: Entrepreneur
- Employer: Dalian Shide Group
- Organization: Dalian Shide F.C.
- Political party: China Zhi Gong Party
- Relatives: Xu Bin (brother)

Xu Ming (Chinese: 徐明; pinyin: Xú Míng; April 1971 – 4 December 2015) was a Chinese entrepreneur and billionaire. He was the founder of the conglomerate Dalian Shide Group, and the chairman of Dalian Shide F.C., China's top football club in the 2000s. In 2005, Forbes ranked him the eighth-richest person in China, with an estimated net worth of US$1.05 billion, but his net worth declined to $690 million in 2011. The 2013 Hurun Report estimated his wealth to be around US$490 million, ranking 676th in China.

Xu had close relationships with several high-ranking government officials and their families, especially the former Politburo member Bo Xilai. After Bo was implicated in a political scandal and fell from power in 2012, Xu was taken into custody, and testified in August 2013 at the trial of Bo, who was convicted and sentenced to life in prison. Xu was also sent to prison, where he died in December 2015, less than a year before his scheduled release.

== Early life and career ==
Xu Ming was born in Dalian, Liaoning Province, Northeast China. He held a master's degree from the Shenyang Institute of Aeronautical Engineering (now Shenyang Aerospace University) and an MBA from Dongbei University of Finance and Economics.

Xu entered the work force in 1990, working for the Foreign Economic and Trade Commission of Zhuanghe, a county-level city under the administration of Dalian. Only a year later, he quit his stable government job to establish several construction companies, which were awarded contracts for the earthwork projects of Shengli Square in front of the Dalian railway station and Xinghai Square, also in Dalian. Both projects were successful and received praises from Dalian municipal officials.

== Dalian Shide Group ==
Xu Ming founded Dalian Shide Group Co. Ltd. in 1992, which was awarded more government contracts to beautify Dalian. He developed a close relationship with Bo Xilai, who was the mayor of Dalian from 1992 to 2000.

He expanded into the plastics industry in August 1995, establishing Shide Plastics Industry Corporation. He further expanded the company in 1998 with an investment of 600 million yuan (US$72 million). In December 1998, Shide became the first company in China to receive the ISO 9002 quality control certification. The company is now one of the world's major producers of chemical building materials. Since the early 2000s Shide has diversified into banking and insurance industries.

== Dalian Shide Football Club ==
Xu Ming was well known as the owner and chairman of Dalian Shide F.C., formerly China's top football club which dominated the Chinese Jia-A League in the 2000s. He bought the team in 2000 from Wang Jianlin, the billionaire real-estate developer in Dalian. He reportedly tried to sell the club for 600 million yuan (US$98 million) in 2009, without success. The club shut down in 2012 after Xu was detained. He reportedly said that he was not interested in football, but invested in the team to please Dalian mayor Bo Xilai, who was a fan of the team.

== Relationship with government officials ==
Xu Ming curried favor with the families of China's government elite. He cared for the parents and children of powerful officials, and had especially close relationships with the families of Bo Xilai and Wen Jiabao, China's former premier and one of Bo's main rivals. When Bo's wife Gu Kailai traveled with their son Bo Guagua to the UK, Xu covered all their expenses. In the late 1990s, he befriended Zhang Peili, the wife of Wen Jiabao, who was then a vice premier. They worked on the same floor in the Ping An Insurance building in Beijing. He also dated Wen's daughter Wen Ruchun, and was close to his son Wen Yunsong. In 2002, the Far Eastern Economic Review reported that Xu Ming was the son-in-law of Wen Jiabao, but Xu publicly denied it. Xu Ming and Wen Ruchun eventually broke up, and Xu drifted closer to his old patron Bo Xilai, who had become China's Minister of Commerce, and then party chief of Chongqing municipality.

== Downfall and trial ==
In the spring of 2012, Bo Xilai was accused of corruption and taken into custody. Xu Ming was detained soon afterwards. Xu's football club was shut down in 2012 after the merger talk with a rival team collapsed. His brother Xu Bin succeeded him as chairman of the Shide Group.

In August 2013, Bo Xilai was charged with taking 21.79 million yuan (US$3.56 million) of bribes from Xu Ming and Tang Xiaolin. At Bo's trial Xu testified that he gave Bo's wife Gu Kailai $3.23 million in 2000 to buy a villa in France, and that he paid for the travel and credit card bills of their son Bo Guagua, but he did not tell Bo Xilai about most of the payments. He was shown testifying on state television, having lost a significant amount of weight. Bo Xilai received a life sentence for corruption and abuse of power. In a trial closed to the public, Xu Ming was sentenced to four years in prison, effective from 2012.

== Death ==
On 4 December 2015, Xu Ming was reported to have died of a heart attack, aged 44. He died in a Wuhan prison where he was held, less than a year before he was scheduled to be released. His body was cremated within days and returned to his hometown of Dalian. Some analysts raised suspicions with the manner of his death and the speed of cremation, although there was no evidence suggesting foul play.
