= Gu Kailai =

Chinese convicted murderer (born 1958)

- 谷开来
- Gu Kailai in 2007
- Born: 15 November 1958 (age 68); Linyi, Shanxi, China
- Other names: Horus L. Kai; Kai Lai; Bo Gu Kailai
- Education: Peking University (LLB, MA)
- Occupations: Attorney businesswoman
- Criminal charge: Murder of Neil Heywood
- Criminal penalty: Death sentence with reprieve; commuted to life imprisonment
- Criminal status: Imprisoned
- Spouse: Bo Xilai (m. 1986)
- Children: Bo Guagua
- Parent: Gu Jingsheng
- Relatives: Bo family (by marriage)

Gu Kailai
- Simplified Chinese: 谷开来
- Traditional Chinese: 谷開來
Transcriptions
Standard Mandarin
- Hanyu Pinyin: Gǔ Kāilái

Alternative Chinese name
- Simplified Chinese: 薄谷开来
- Traditional Chinese: 薄谷開來
Transcriptions
Standard Mandarin
- Hanyu Pinyin: Bógǔ Kāilái

Gu Kailai (born 15 November 1958) is a Chinese former lawyer and businesswoman. She is the second wife of former Politburo member Bo Xilai, one of China's most influential politicians until he was stripped of his offices in 2012. In August 2012, Gu was convicted of murdering British businessman Neil Heywood and was given a suspended death sentence, later commuted to life imprisonment in December 2015.

== Early life ==
Gu is the youngest of five daughters of General Gu Jingsheng, a prominent revolutionary in the years before the Chinese Communist Party took power. Gu's mother, Fan Chengxiu, was a descendant of the renowned Song dynasty chancellor and poet Fan Zhongyan. General Gu held various government positions during early Communist rule but was imprisoned during the Cultural Revolution. Gu Kailai herself was also punished, being forced to work in a butcher shop and a textile factory.

After the gaokao was reinstated, Gu entered Peking University, from which she graduated with an LLB degree in law and then a master's degree in international relations.

== Career ==
In 1988, Gu founded the Kailai Law Firm in Dalian, and subsequently established herself as a prominent lawyer in the city. In 1995, she relocated the firm's headquarters to Beijing and in 2001 changed its name to Angdao. In the course of her career, she was involved in several high-profile cases, and is suggested to have been the first Chinese lawyer to win a civil suit in the United States, where she represented several Dalian-area companies involved in a dispute in Mobile, Alabama. In 1998, she published a book, Uphold Justice in America, about her lawsuit in the US and her views of the U.S. justice system, which she deemed inept: "They can level charges against dogs and a court can even convict a husband of raping his wife," she wrote in the book. "We don't play with words and we adhere to the principle of 'based on facts,'...You will be arrested, sentenced and executed as long as we determine that you killed someone."

== Murder case ==
In March 2012, Gu became embroiled in a national scandal after her husband's deputy, Wang Lijun, sought refuge at the U.S. consulate in Chengdu. It was rumored that Wang presented evidence of a corruption scandal, whereby Bo sought to impede a corruption investigation against Gu. Specifically, Wang stated that Gu had been involved in the murder of Neil Heywood after a business dispute. Following the Wang Lijun incident and Bo's removal from key Communist Party posts, Gu was placed under investigation for Heywood's death. On 10 April 2012, Gu was detained and "transferred to the judicial authorities" as part of the investigation.

On 26 July 2012, Gu was formally charged with murdering Heywood, based on what the prosecutor claimed was "irrefutable and substantial" evidence. On 9 August 2012, Gu admitted during a one-day trial that she was responsible for Heywood's murder. She claimed that her actions were due to a "mental breakdown" after her son had been threatened by Heywood, and stated that she would "accept and calmly face any sentence".

On 20 August 2012, Gu received a suspended death sentence, which is normally commuted to a life sentence after two years, but she could be released on medical parole after serving nine years in prison. The trial lasted one day, and Gu did not contest her charges. Zhang Xiaojun, a Bo family aide, was sentenced to 9 years in jail for his involvement in the murder following his confession.

After the media published footage of the trial, claims that the woman shown in court was not in fact Gu, but a body double, quickly became popular on the Chinese Internet. Experts held differing opinions on the matter: the Financial Times cited the conclusion of "security experts familiar with facial recognition software" that the person who stood trial was not Gu, whereas a facial recognition expert contacted by Slate was of the opinion that the woman most likely was Gu. The practice of rich people paying others to stand trial and receive punishment in their place, called ding zui, is relatively widespread in China.

Following the verdict, the United Kingdom announced that it welcomed the investigation, and said that they "consistently made clear to the Chinese authorities that we wanted to see the trials in this case conform to international human rights standards and for the death penalty not to be applied." BBC News commented that "informed observers see the fingerprints of the Communist Party of China all over this outcome", stating that the trial's conclusion was "all too neat and uncannily suited to one particular agenda", that of limiting the scandal's damage.

Officially, Neil Heywood was murdered because he demanded $22 million from Gu after a real estate venture failed, and after Heywood sent an email which threatened her son, Gu decided to neutralise the threat. At a hotel in Chongqing, Gu gave Heywood whiskey and tea. Heywood became drunk and vomited. When he tried to go to bed, Gu poured animal poison into his mouth and she placed pills next to him to make it appear as though he had overdosed on drugs.

However, according to Reuters, at the end of 2011, Gu asked Heywood to move a large amount of money out of China. Heywood agreed to do that if Gu paid him a certain amount of money. But Heywood asked for a larger cut of the money than Gu expected. When Gu told Heywood he was being greedy, Heywood threatened to expose what Gu was doing. Gu was outraged and decided to kill Heywood. An academic close to the Bo family said Wang Lijun had written two letters to the Central Commission for Discipline Inspection (CCDI) which accused Gu of moving several hundred million dollars out of the country. The Central Commission for Discipline Inspection (CCDI) did not act immediately but the letters increased pressure for a deep probe.

On 14 December 2015, Gu's sentence was commuted to life imprisonment. The prison authorities said Gu had expressed repentance and had made no intentional offences during their review.

== Personal life ==
While studying at Peking University, Gu was a schoolmate with Bo Xilai. According to Li Danyu, Bo's first wife, they started an affair then that broke Bo's first marriage. But Gu claimed that she first met Bo in 1984 on her field trip looking into environmental art in Jin County, Liaoning, where he was the Communist Party secretary. The couple married in 1986 and had one son, Bo Kuangyi, better known as Guagua.

During their marriage, Bo's serial womanizing is said to push Gu into relying on a circle of close confidants, including Patrick Henri Devillers, Larry Cheng, Neil Heywood, and Wang Lijun, a pattern in turn leading to speculation, including from Bo, about her relationships with them. In 2013, Bo admitted at trial that he had been unfaithful to his wife, which drove her to take away their son to England.

== Popular culture ==
In the Chinese TV series Uphold Justice in America (2002), based on her book of the same name, Gu is played by Jiang Shan.

In the US film The Laundromat (2019), Gu is played by Rosalind Chao.

== Book ==
胜诉在美国 (Sheng su zai Meiguo) [Uphold Justice in America] (in Simplified Chinese). 光明日报出版社 (Guangming Daily Publishing House). 1998. ISBN 978-7800918704.
