= List of Légion d'honneur recipients by name (K) =

The French government gives out the Legion of Honour awards, to both French and foreign nationals, based on a recipient's exemplary services rendered to France, or to the causes supported by France. This award is divided into five distinct categories (in ascending order), i.e. three ranks: Knight, Officer, Commander, and two titles: Grand Officer and Grand Cross. Knight is the most common and is awarded for either at least 20 years of public service or acts of military or civil bravery. The rest of the categories have a quota for the number of years of service in the category below before they can be awarded. The Officer rank requires a minimum of eight years as a Knight, and the Commander, the highest civilian category for a non-French citizen, requires a minimum of five years as an Officer. The Grand Officer and the Grand Cross are awarded only to French citizens, and each requires three years' service in their respective immediately lower rank. The awards are traditionally published and promoted on 14 July.

The following is a non-exhaustive list of recipients of the Legion of Honour awards, since the first ceremony in May 1803. 2,550 individuals can be awarded the insignia every year. The total number of awards is close to 1 million (estimated at 900,000 in 2021, including over 3,000 Grand Cross recipients), with some 92,000 recipients alive today. Only until 2008 was gender parity achieved amongst the yearly list of recipients, with the total number of women recipients since the award's establishment being only 59 at the end of the second French empire and only 26,000 in 2021.

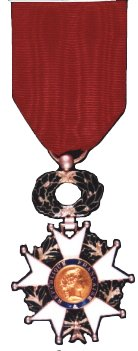

Recipient	Dates (birth – death)	General Work, and reason for the recognition	Award category (date)
Jan Kaczmarek			
Jean-Pierre Kahane			
Jules Kananura	1936-1999	Rwandan Ambassador	Commander (June 8,1977)
N'Golo Kanté		World Cup winning footballer	
Viatcheslav Moshe Kantor	1953	Jewish leader, philanthropist and businessman	
Crown Prince Alexander II Karađorđević			
Prince Bojidar Karageorgevitch	1862 – 1908	Serbian prince	
Feridun Karakaya			
Juhani Kaskeala			
Bentley Kassal			
Harry B. Kates, Jr	1923 – present	WW2 Veteran	
Aki Kaurismäki			
Danny Kaye			
Tevfik Remzi Kazancıgil		Turkish physician and Professor in Medicine	TBA (September 14, 1954)
Frank B. Kellogg			
Gene Kelly			
Raymond W. Kelly			
M Stephen Kellman	1923 – present		
Yaşar Kemal	1923 – present	Turkish novelist	
Raymond Kendall			
Duncan Kerr			Knight (23 August 2011)
Mohamad Keyvan	1909 – 1987	Iranian Civil and Structural Engineer	
Abbas Kiarostami	1940 – present	Iranian film director, screenwriter, and film producer	
Dame Carol Kidu	1948 - present	Papua New Guinean politician and human rights campaigner	
Philippe Kieffer			
Jean-Claude Killy			
Jeong H. Kim			
Young-Oak Kim			
Presnel Kimpembe		World Cup winning footballer	
Ernest King			
Lisa Kishkin	1914 –2015	Educator	2013
Julian Klaczko			
Franciszek Kleeberg			
Jacques Paul Klein	1939-Present	Special Representative of the Secretary General	15 May 2000
Ralph Klein	1942 – 2013	Canadian politician.	
Matti Klinge			
Augusta Déjerine-Klumpke	1859 – 1927	Physician	
Dorothea Klumpke			
Karol Kniaziewicz			
Professor Roy Knight	1907 – 1999	Professor of French, scholar of 17th-century tragic drama	
Louis Aston Knight	1873 – 1948	American landscape painter	
Edmund Knoll-Kownacki			
Blanche Knopf		American publisher. Recognised for his Work publishing French literature.	Officer (1960)
William A. Knowlton			
John Immanuel Knudson		Professor of History and Economics, Polytechnic Institute of Brooklyn	TBA (1935)
Adam Koc	1891 – 1969	Polish politician, soldier and journalist	
Maurice Koechlin			
Ossip Komissarov		A Russian hat master (Kostroma province). Recognised for unwittingly foiling an assassination attempt on the Russian Emperor Alexander II.	Knight (TBA)
Wladyslaw Konopczynski			
C. Everett Koop			TBA (1980)
Raymond Kopa	1931 – present	French footballer	
Lina Kostenko	1930 – present	Ukrainian poet and literaturer	Knight (2022)
Wojciech Kossak			
Sir John Kotelawala			
Lansana Kouyaté			
Jan Kozietulski			
Jacek Kuroń	1934 – 2004	Polish historian	
Akira Kurosawa	1910 – 1998	Japanese film director, producer and screenwriter	
Yevhen Kushnaryov	1951 – 2007	Ukrainian politician	
Emir Kusturica			
Stanislaw Kutrzeba			

== See also ==
- Legion of Honour
- List of Legion of Honour recipients by name
- List of foreign recipients of Legion of Honour by name
- List of foreign recipients of the Legion of Honour by country
- List of British recipients of the Legion of Honour for the Crimean War
- Legion of Honour Museum
- Ribbons of the French military and civil awards
- War Cross (France)
