= 4th Central Bureau of the Chinese Communist Party =

4th electoral term of the Central Bureau of the Chinese Communist Party

The 4th Central Bureau of the Chinese Communist Party (CCP), formally the Central Bureau of the 4th Central Executive Committee of the Communist Party of China, was elected at the 1st plenary session of the 4th Central Executive Committee of the CCP on 22 January 1925 in the aftermath of the 4th National Congress. This electoral term was preceded by the 3rd Central Bureau and succeeded by the 5th Politburo.

== Composition ==
=== Members ===
Members of the Central Bureau of the 4th Central Executive Committee of the Chinese Communist Party
Officeholder		3rd	5th	Birth	PM	Death	Birthplace	Gender	Ref.
Cai Hesen	蔡和森	Old	Elected	1895	1921	1931	Shanghai	Male	
Chen Duxiu	陳獨秀	Old	Elected	1879	1921	1942	Anhui	Male	
Peng Shuzhi	彭述之	New	Not	1896	1924	1983	Hunan	Male	
Qu Qiubai (Note: Qu Qiubai served as a member from January to May 1925.)	瞿秋白	New	Elected	1899	1921	1935	Fujian	Male	
Xiang Jingyu (Note: Xiang Jingyu served as a member from May 1925 to April 1927.)	向警予	New	Not	1895	1921	1928	Hunan	Female	
Zhang Guotao	张国焘	New	Elected	1897	1921	1979	Sichuan	Male	

=== Central Standing Committee (April–May 1927) ===
Members of the Standing Committee of the Central Bureau of the 4th Central Executive Committee of the Chinese Communist Party
Rank	Officeholder		5th	Birth	PM	Death	Birthplace	Gender	Ref.
1	Qu Qiubai	瞿秋白	Not	1899	1921	1935	Fujian	Male	
2	Tan Pingshan	譚平山	Not	1886	1921	1956	Guangdong	Male	
3	Zhang Guotao	张国焘	Elected	1897	1921	1979	Sichuan	Male	
