= 6th Politburo of the Chinese Communist Party =

The 6th Politburo, formally the Political Bureau of the 6th Central Committee of the Communist Party of China, was elected by the 1st plenary session of the 6th Central Committee in 1928, in the aftermath of the 6th National Congress of the Chinese Communist Party (CCP). This electoral term was preceded by the 5th Politburo and succeeded by the 7th in 1945.

Alternate membership was discontinued in the October 1936 reorganisation, and the Provisional Politburo had no alternates.

== Composition ==
=== Members ===
Members of the Political Bureau of the 6th Central Committee of the Chinese Communist Party
Officeholder		5th PB	1st PLE	3rd PLE	4th PLE	PROVIS	5th PLE	OCT. 1936	OCT. 1937	7th PB	Birth	PM	Death	Birthplace	Ref.
Bo Gu	博古	New	Not	Not	Not	Member	Member	Not	Not	Not	1907	1925	1946	Jiangsu	
Cai Hesen (Note: Executed by Kuomintang state authorities on 4 August 1931.)	蔡和森	Old	Member	Not	Not	Not	Not	Not	Not	Not	1895	1921	1931	Shanghai	
Chen Changhao (Note: By-elected as a member of the Politburo in August 1934 in between the convocation of the 5th plenary session and the Politburo reorganisation in October 1936.)	陈昌浩	New	Not	Not	Not	Not	Member	Not	Not	Not	1906	1927	1967	Hubei	
Chen Yu	陈郁	New	Not	Not	Member	Not	Not	Not	Not	Not	1901	1925	1974	Shenzhen	
Chen Yun	陈云	New	Not	Not	Not	Member	Member	Not	Member	Elected	1905	1925	1995	Shanghai	
Deng Fa	邓发	New	Not	Not	Not	Not	Alternate	Alternate	Member	Not	1906	1928	1946	Guangdong	
Gu Zuolin (Note: Died of natural causes on 28 May 1934.)	顾作霖	New	Not	Not	Not	Not	Member	Not	Not	Not	1908	1925	1934	Jiangsu	
Guan Xiangying	关向应	New	Alternate	Member	Member	Not	Member	Not	Not	Not	1902	1924	1946	Liaoning	
Kai Feng	凯丰	New	Not	Not	Not	Not	Alternate	Alternate	Member	Not	1906	1930	1955	Jiangxi	
Kang Sheng	康生	New	Not	Not	Not	Member	Member	Not	Member	Elected	1898	1925	1975	Shandong	
Li Lisan (Note: By-elected as a member of the Politburo in November 1928 in between the convocations of the first and third plenums.)	李立三	Alternate	Member	Member	Not	Not	Not	Not	Not	Not	1899	1921	1967	Hunan	
Li Zhusheng	李竹声	New	Not	Not	Not	Member	Not	Not	Not	Not	1903	1925	1973	Anhui	
Lin Yuying (Note: By-elected as a member of the Politburo in January 1936 in between the convocation of the 5th plenary session and the Politburo reorganisation in October 1936.)	林育英	New	Not	Not	Not	Not	Member	Not	Not	Not	1897	1922	1942	Hubei	
Liu Shaoqi	刘少奇	New	Not	Not	Alternate	Not	Alternate	Member	Member	Elected	1898	1921	1969	Henan	
Lu Futan (Note: Defected to the Kuomintang in January 1933.)	卢福坦	New	Alternate	Alternate	Member	Member	Not	Not	Not	Not	1890	1926	1969	Shandong	
Mao Zedong (Note: By-elected as a member of the Politburo by a decision of the Zunyi Conference on 15–17 January 1935 in between the convocation of the 5th plenary session and the Politburo reorganisation in October 1936.)	毛泽东	Alternate	Not	Alternate	Alternate	Not	Member	Member	Member	Elected	1893	1921	1976	Hunan	
Peng Dehuai (Note: By-elected as a member of the Politburo in January 1936 in between the convocation of the 5th plenary session and the Politburo reorganisation in August 1935.)	彭德怀	New	Not	Not	Not	Not	Member	Not	Member	Elected	1898	1928	1974	Hunan	
Qu Qiubai	瞿秋白	Old	Member	Member	Not	Not	Not	Not	Not	Not	1899	1921	1935	Fujian	
Ren Bishi	任弼时	New	Not	Not	Member	Not	Member	Member	Member	Elected	1904	1922	1950	Hunan	
Su Zhaozheng (Note: Died of natural causes on 25 February 1929.)	苏兆征	Old	Member	Not	Not	Not	Not	Not	Not	Not	1885	1925	1929	Guangdong	
Wang Jiaxiang	王稼祥	New	Not	Not	Not	Not	Alternate	Not	Member	Not	1906	1928	1974	Anhui	
Wang Ming	王明	New	Not	Not	Member	Not	Member	Not	Member	Not	1904	1925	1974	Anhui	
Wang Yuncheng (Note: Defected to the Kuomintang in 1933.)	王云程	New	Not	Not	Not	Member	Not	Not	Not	Not	1905	1925	1969	Hubei	
Xiang Ying (Note: Killed in action on 14 March 1941.)	项英	New	Member	Member	Member	Not	Member	Member	Member	Not	1895	1922	1941	Anhui	
Xiang Zhongfa (Note: Executed by Kuomintang state authorities on 24 June 1931.)	向忠发	Old	Member	Member	Member	Not	Not	Not	Not	Not	1879	1921	1931	Shanghai	
Xu Xigen	徐锡根	New	Alternate	Alternate	Member	Not	Not	Not	Not	Not	1903	?	?	Jiangsu	
Zhang Guotao (Note: Defected to the Kuomintang on 18 April 1938.)	张国焘	Alternate	Member	Member	Not	Not	Member	Member	Member	Not	1897	1921	1979	Sichuan	
Zhang Wentian	张闻天	New	Not	Not	Not	Member	Member	Member	Member	Elected	1900	1925	1976	Shanghai	
Zhou Chunquan (Note: By-elected as a member of the Politburo in January 1936 in between the convocation of the 5th plenary session and the Politburo reorganisation in August 1934.)	周纯全	New	Not	Not	Not	Not	Member	Not	Not	Not	1905	1926	1985	Hubei	
Zhou Enlai	周恩来	Old	Member	Member	Member	Not	Member	Member	Member	Elected	1898	1921	1976	Jiangsu	
Zhu De	朱德	New	Not	Not	Not	Not	Member	Member	Member	Elected	1886	1925	1976	Sichuan	

=== Alternates ===
Alternates of the Political Bureau of the 6th Central Committee of the Chinese Communist Party
Officeholder		5th PB	1st PLE	3rd PLE	4th PLE	5th PLE	Birth	PM	Death	Birthplace	Ref.
Deng Fa	邓发	New	Not	Not	Not	Alternate	1906	1928	1946	Guangdong	
Gu Shunzhang (Note: Defected to the Kuomintang on 24 April 1931.)	顾顺章	Member	Not	Alternate	Alternate	Not	1903	1925	1934	Jiangsu	
Guan Xiangying	关向应	New	Alternate	Member	Member	Not	1902	1924	1946	Liaoning	
Kai Feng	凯丰	New	Not	Not	Not	Alternate	1906	1930	1955	Jiangxi	
Li Lisan (Note: By-elected as a member of the Politburo in November 1928 in between the convocations of the first and third plenums.)	李立三	Alternate	Alternate	Member	Not	Not	1899	1921	1967	Hunan	
Li Weihan	李维汉	Member	Not	Not	Alternate	Not	1896	1921	1984	Hunan	
Liu Shaoqi	刘少奇	New	Not	Not	Alternate	Alternate	1898	1921	1969	Henan	
Lu Futan (Note: Defected to the Kuomintang in January 1933.)	卢福坦	New	Alternate	Alternate	Member	Member	1890	1926	1969	Shandong	
Luo Dengxian	罗登贤	Member	Alternate	Not	Not	Not	1905	1925	1933	Guangdong	
Mao Zedong (Note: By-elected as a member of the Politburo by a decision of the Zunyi Conference on 15–17 January 1935 in between the convocation of the 5th plenary session and the Politburo reorganisation in October 1936.)	毛泽东	Alternate	Not	Not	Alternate	Alternate	1893	1921	1976	Hunan	
Peng Pai (Note: Executed by Kuomintang state authorities on 30 August 1929.)	杨殷	Member	Alternate	Not	Not	Not	1896	1921	1929	Guangdong	
Wang Jiaxiang	王稼祥	New	Not	Not	Not	Alternate	1906	1928	1974	Anhui	
Wang Kequan (Note: Expelled from the Party by a decision of the 6th Central Committee for engaging in factionalism.)	王克全	New	Not	Not	Alternate	Not	1906	1924	1939	Anhui	
Wen Yucheng (Note: Defected to the Kuomintang in 1933.)	温裕成	New	Not	Alternate	Alternate	Not	?	?	1933	Jiangsu	
Xu Xigen	徐锡根	New	Alternate	Alternate	Member	Not	1903	?	?	Jiangsu	
Yang Yin (Note: Executed by Kuomintang state authorities on 8 August 1929.)	杨殷	New	Alternate	Not	Not	Not	1892	1922	1929	Guangdong	

== Bibliography ==
- Dillon, Michael (2020). Zhou Enlai: The Enigma Behind Chairman Mao. I.B. Tauris. ISBN 978-1-7845-3615-2.
- Hartman, Ray T. (2023). Self-Reflections of Fears and Dreams: Political Legitimacy and Strategic Thinking Among Chinese Communist Party Leaders, 1927-1953. Lexington Books. ISBN 9781666916850.
