= 5th Politburo of the Chinese Communist Party =

The 5th Politburo, formally the Political Bureau of the 5th Central Committee of the Communist Party of China, was elected by the 1st plenary session of the 5th Central Committee in 1927, in the aftermath of the 5th National Congress of the Chinese Communist Party (CCP). This electoral term was preceded by the 4th Central Bureau and succeeded by the 6th Politburo in 1928.

== Composition ==
=== Members ===
Members of the Political Bureau of the 5th Central Committee of the Chinese Communist Party
Officeholder		4th CEB	1st PLE	PROVIS	6th POL	Birth	PM	Death	Birthplace	Ref.
Cai Hesen	蔡和森	Old	Member	Not	Elected	1895	1921	1931	Shanghai	
Chen Duxiu	陳獨秀	Old	Member	Not	Not	1879	1921	1942	Anhui	
Gu Shunzhang	顾顺章	New	Not	Member	Not	1903	1925	1934	Jiangsu	
Li Lisan	李立三	New	Member	Alternate	Not	1899	1921	1967	Hunan	
Li Weihan	李维汉	New	Member	Member	Not	1896	1921	1984	Hunan	
Luo Dengxian (Note: Luo Dengxian was a member until July 1928.)	罗登贤	New	Not	Member	Not	1905	1925	1933	Guangdong	
Luo Yinong (Note: Luo Yinong was a member until April 1928.)	罗亦农	New	Not	Member	Not	1902	1921	1928	Hunan	
Peng Pai	杨殷	New	Not	Member	Not	1896	1921	1929	Guangdong	
Qu Qiubai	瞿秋白	Old	Member	Member	Elected	1899	1921	1935	Fujian	
Ren Bishi	任弼时	New	Not	Member	Not	1904	1922	1950	Hunan	
Su Zhaozheng	苏兆征	New	Not	Member	Elected	1885	1925	1929	Guangdong	
Tan Pingshan	譚平山	New	Member	Not	Not	1886	1921	1956	Guangdong	
Wang Hebo (Note: Wang Hebo was a member until October 1928.)	王荷波	New	Not	Member	Not	1882	1922	1927	Fujian	
Xiang Ying (Note: Xiang Ying was a member until July 1928.)	项英	New	Not	Member	Not	1895	1922	1941	Anhui	
Xiang Zhongfa	向忠发	New	Not	Member	Elected	1879	1921	1931	Shanghai	
Zhang Guotao	张国焘	Old	Member	Alternate	Not	1897	1921	1979	Sichuan	
Zhou Enlai (Note: Zhou Enlai was by-elected as a member of the Politburo in May 1928, and served as an ordinary member until August when he was demoted to alternate membership. He was by-elected as a member again in November 1927.)	周恩来	New	Member	Member	Elected	1898	1921	1976	Jiangsu	

=== Alternates ===
Alternates of the Political Bureau of the 5th Central Committee of the Chinese Communist Party
Officeholder		4th CEB	1st PLE	PROVIS	6th POL	Birth	PM	Death	Birthplace	Ref.
Deng Zhongxia	邓中夏	New	Not	Alternate	Not	1894	1921	1933	Hunan	
Li Lisan	李立三	New	Member	Alternate	Member	1899	1921	1967	Hunan	
Mao Zedong (Note: Mao Zedong was an alternate until November 1927.)	毛泽东	New	Not	Alternate	Not	1893	1921	1976	Hunan	
Peng Gongda (Note: Peng Gongda was an alternate until November 1927.)	彭公达	New	Not	Alternate	Not	1903	1921	1928	Hunan	
Su Zhaozheng	苏兆征	New	Alternate	Not	Not	1885	1925	1929	Guangdong	
Zhang Guotao (Note: Zhang Guotao was an alternate until November 1927.)	张国焘	New	Member	Alternate	Member	1897	1921	1979	Sichuan	
Zhang Tailei (Note: Zhang Tailei was an alternate until December 1927.)	张太雷	New	Not	Alternate	Not	1898	1921	1927	Jiangsu	
Zhou Enlai	周恩来	New	Alternate	Alternate	Not	1898	1921	1976	Jiangsu	

== Bibliography ==
- Dillon, Michael (2020). Zhou Enlai: The Enigma Behind Chairman Mao. I.B. Tauris. ISBN 978-1-7845-3615-2.
- Hartman, Ray T. (2023). Self-Reflections of Fears and Dreams: Political Legitimacy and Strategic Thinking Among Chinese Communist Party Leaders, 1927-1953. Lexington Books. ISBN 9781666916850.
