= 3rd Politburo =

3rd Politburo may refer to:

- 3rd Politburo of the Chinese Communist Party
- 3rd Politburo of the Communist Party of Cuba
- 3rd Politburo of the Lao People's Revolutionary Party
- 3rd Politburo of the Workers' Party of Vietnam
- 3rd Standing Committee of the Workers' Party of Korea
