= Claude Cadart =

French sinologist (1927–2019)

Claude Cadart (Chinese: 高达乐; pinyin: Gāo Dálè; 12 November 1927 – 4 May 2019) was a French sinologist and a specialist in the history of contemporary China. Together with his wife Cheng Yingxiang, he translated and published the memoirs of his father-in-law Peng Shuzhi, a dissident Trotskyist early leader of the Chinese Communist Party. He was one of the first European intellectuals to criticize Mao Zedong's political campaigns.

== Biography ==
Cadart was born on 12 November 1927 in Paris. He participated in anti-Nazi resistance during World War II and later worked as a journalist.

In the early 1960s, Cadart became a researcher at the Centre de recherches internationales (CERI) of Sciences Po and dedicated himself to the study of contemporary China. At a time when many sinologists considered Mao Zedong a visionary leader, Cadart cautioned that Mao's political campaigns, most notably the Cultural Revolution, were not the liberation or left movements that many European leftists had envisioned, but were merely political machinations for maintaining his own power. This was before Simon Leys published Les Habits neufs du président Mao in 1971, the famous work that exposed the destructions of Mao's Cultural Revolution.

Cadart was married to Cheng Yingxiang (程映湘), the daughter of the early Chinese Communist Party leader Peng Shuzhi. Peng had been expelled from the CCP for supporting Trotskyism and fled to France with his family after the CCP victory in the Chinese Civil War. Cadart and Cheng organized, translated into French, and published the memoirs of Peng Shuzhi, which exposed an aspect of Communist China little known to the outside world at the time. After Mao's death in 1976 and the advent of the Deng Xiaoping era, Cadart assisted Cheng with her book Dégel de l’intelligence en Chine.

Cadart died in Paris on 4 May 2019, the centenary of China's May Fourth Movement, at the age of 91.
