= Lisa Kishkin =

Russian-born Chinese teacher of Russian (1914–2015)

- 李莎
- Kishkin in 1946
- Born: Elizaveta Pavlovna Kishkina; 20 March 1914; Studenka, Saratov Governorate, Russian Empire
- Died: 12 May 2015 (aged 101); Beijing, China
- Other name: Li Sha
- Citizenship: Soviet (until 1964); Chinese (from 1964)
- Occupations: Teacher, translator
- Spouse: Li Lisan (m. 1936; died 1967)
- Children: Li Yingnan; Li Yalan

Elizaveta Pavlovna Kishkina (Russian: Елизавета Павловна Кишкина; 20 March 1914 – 12 May 2015), known in English as Lisa Kishkin and in China as Li Sha (Chinese: 李莎), was a Russian-born Chinese teacher of the Russian language. Born into a noble family in the Saratov Governorate, she married the Chinese communist leader Li Lisan in Moscow in 1936, and she moved with him to China in 1946. She taught Russian at Beijing Foreign Studies University for about 50 years, and Russian and Chinese media described her as a legend of Russian studies in China. She died in Beijing in 2015, at the age of 101.

== Early life ==
Kishkina was born on 20 March 1914 in the village of Studenka, in the Saratov Governorate of the Russian Empire. Her father was a hereditary nobleman, and she spent her childhood on his estate in Studenka. In Moscow, she was a member of the Young Pioneers and later of the Komsomol. In 1931, at the age of 17, she graduated from a factory training school, and she was assigned to work at a regional publishing house in the Russian Far East. She later graduated in French from a foreign languages institute in Moscow.

== Marriage to Li Lisan ==
In the autumn of 1933, Kishkina met Li Lisan, a former leader of the Chinese Communist Party (CCP) who was then living in Moscow, at the home of the Chinese communist Yang Song. She first knew him under an alias. They married in early February 1936 in a small room in the Hotel Lux, where the Comintern housed its staff, and the guests included Chen Yun and Yang Zhihua. According to Nezavisimaya Gazeta, her husband chose her Chinese name, taking "Li" from Liza and "Sha" for a flower growing on sand.

During the Great Purge, Li was arrested by the NKVD in 1938. Kishkina searched the prisons of Moscow until she found him in Taganka Prison. He spent about two years in prison, and he was freed, reportedly through the intervention of Zhou Enlai. Their first daughter, Li Yingnan, was born in Moscow in 1943.

== Life in China ==
Li returned to China in January 1946. Later that year, after receiving a letter from him, Kishkina travelled for about ten days with Li Yingnan to join him in Harbin. At her own request, she was assigned to teach at a Russian-language school in Harbin, and she later taught at the Beijing Russian Institute. Soon after arriving in China, she also took up translation work, and she helped to translate and edit texts into Russian. Their second daughter, Li Yalan, was born in China in 1948. As the wife of the head of the All-China Federation of Trade Unions, she attended official events in Beijing. In October 1949, she watched Mao Zedong's proclamation of the People's Republic, at which her husband stood beside Mao.

Kishkina taught Russian at Beijing Foreign Studies University for about 50 years, until she retired in 1996 at the age of 82. Several of her former students became professors and ambassadors. One of them, Yao Peishan, a former Chinese ambassador to Ukraine, recalled that he had been taught by a Russian teacher at a Chinese university.

After the Sino-Soviet split, the CCP demanded that members with Soviet wives divorce them, but Li refused, and Kishkina was allowed to stay in China on condition that she became a Chinese citizen. She took Chinese citizenship in 1964, with the approval of Zhou Enlai.

== Cultural Revolution ==
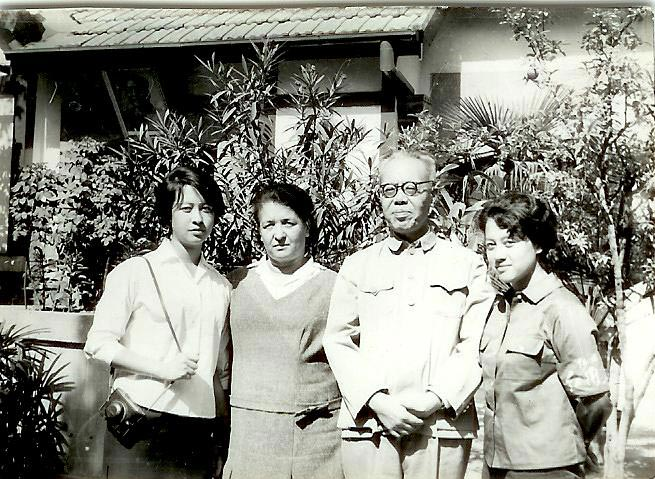
Kishkin (second from left) with her husband and daughters in 1966

During the Cultural Revolution, on 21 June 1967, Kishkina and her husband were denounced as capitalist roaders, counter-revolutionaries and foreign spies at a Red Guard rally. Li had been taken from their home two days earlier, and he died in custody shortly afterwards. His death was officially described as suicide. On the afternoon of his death, Kishkina was placed under watch, and she was then handed over to the Ministry of Public Security and held in a single cell at Qincheng Prison. She spent about eight years in solitary confinement, during which she learned Chinese.

In 1975, she was released and sent to live in Yuncheng, in Shanxi. She learned of her husband's death only during the Spring Festival of 1976, when her daughters visited her. According to Nezavisimaya Gazeta, she learned of the birth of her grandson only after her release. In December 1978, Hu Yaobang approved her return to Beijing. Li was rehabilitated on 27 December 1979, and a memorial meeting was held for him on 20 March 1980, her 66th birthday. Kishkina herself was fully rehabilitated in 1979, and she was given the title of professor.

== Later life ==
After her rehabilitation, Kishkina returned to work in the Russian faculty of Beijing Foreign Studies University. She became a member of the Chinese People's Political Consultative Conference. She received the Pushkin Medal of the International Association of Teachers of Russian Language and Literature for her work. In the early 1990s, she visited the Saratov, where some residents of Studenka still remembered her family. She never remarried after Li's death.

In 2009, she published a 411-page autobiography in Chinese, My Fateful Bond with China (Wode Zhongguo Yuanfen), with the Foreign Language Teaching and Research Press. Chen Haosu, then president of the Chinese People's Association for Friendship with Foreign Countries, called it "the best gift" for the 60th anniversary of the People's Republic. At her 95th birthday celebration in the Great Hall of the People, Russian ambassador to China Sergei Razov praised her contribution to relations between China and Russia.

On 8 July 2013, at the age of 99, Kishkina was awarded the Officer of Legion of Honour in her room at the Beijing Friendship Hospital, in the presence of family and friends. French ambassador Sylvie Bermann called her a "living emblem of resistance to extraordinary forces". According to Xinhua, she had never lost her love of the French language and French literature, and she had acted as host and interpreter for a visiting delegation of French women.

On 20 March 2014, a symposium marked her 100th birthday, at which the Russian ambassador Andrey Denisov read a message of congratulations, but she was unable to attend because of illness. That year, her Russian-language memoirs, Iz Rossii v Kitai: put' dlinoyu v sto let (From Russia to China: A Path a Century Long), were published in Moscow by Izdatelsky Proekt, with a preface by the writer Wang Meng. The book covers her childhood in a noble family, her youth in Soviet Moscow and her life in China, with portraits of figures such as Mao, Jiang Qing, Liu Shaoqi and Zhou Enlai. A new edition was published by the Shans publishing house, and it was presented at the education department of the Chinese embassy on 25 May 2018.

Kishkina died in a Beijing hospital on 12 May 2015, at the age of 101, with her family at her side. According to Rossiyskaya Gazeta, she had told her grandson that she would not have changed anything in her life.

== Family ==
Kishkina and Li had two daughters, Li Yingnan and Li Yalan, who both followed their mother into teaching. Li Yingnan became director of the Russian Language Centre at Beijing Foreign Studies University. In 2022, the Russian writer Alexander Arkhangelsky published Russkiy ieroglif (The Russian Hieroglyph), the life story of Li Yingnan, under her Russian name Inna Li, as told by herself.

== Honours ==
- Officer of the Legion of Honour (2013)
- International Association of Teachers of Russian Language and Literature
- Pushkin Medal

== Works ==
- Li Sha (2009). 我的中国缘分 [My Fateful Bond with China] (in Chinese). Beijing: Foreign Language Teaching and Research Press.
- Kishkina, Elizaveta Pavlovna (2014). Из России в Китай: путь длиною в сто лет [From Russia to China: A Path a Century Long] (in Russian). Moscow: Izdatelsky Proekt.
