= Ludwig Teller =

American politician

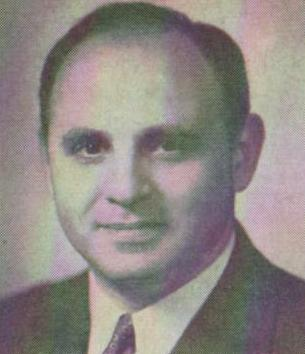

Member of the U.S. House of Representatives from New York's 20th district
- In office January 3, 1957 – January 3, 1961
- Preceded by: Irwin D. Davidson
- Succeeded by: William Fitts Ryan

Member of the New York State Assembly from New York's 5th district
- In office January 1, 1951 – December 31, 1956
- Preceded by: Monroe Flegenheimer
- Succeeded by: Bentley Kassal

Personal details
- Born: June 22, 1911 New York City, US
- Died: October 4, 1965 (aged 54) New York City, US
- Party: Democratic

Ludwig Teller (June 22, 1911 – October 4, 1965) was an American lawyer, politician, and World War II veteran from New York. From 1957 to 1961, he served two terms in the U.S. House of Representatives.

== Life ==
Teller was born on June 22, 1911, in Manhattan. He graduated from New York University in 1936. He served as a Lieutenant in the United States Navy during World War II. He served on the faculty of New York University Law School from 1947 until 1950.

=== Political career ===
He was a member of the New York State Assembly (New York Co., 5th D.) from 1951 to 1956, sitting in the 168th through 170th New York State Legislatures.

==== Congress ====
He was elected as a Democrat to the 85th and 86th United States Congresses, holding office from January 3, 1957, to January 3, 1961. He was defeated for renomination in the Democratic primary of 1960 by Reform Democrat William Fitts Ryan.

=== Death and burial ===
Teller died on October 4, 1965, and was buried at the Union Field Cemetery in Ridgewood, Queens.

== See also ==
- List of Jewish members of the United States Congress

== Sources ==
- United States Congress. "Ludwig Teller (id: T000118)". Biographical Directory of the United States Congress.

New York State Assembly
Preceded by Monroe Flegenheimer	New York State Assembly; New York County, 5th District; 1951–1956	Succeeded by Bentley Kassal
U.S. House of Representatives
Preceded by Irwin D. Davidson	Member of the U.S. House of Representatives from New York's 20th congressional district 1957–1961	Succeeded by William Fitts Ryan
