= Chen Bilan =

Chinese communist leader

- Born: 1902
- Died: 1987 (aged 84–85)
- Spouse: Peng Shuzhi

Chen Bilan (also spelled Ch'en Pi-Lan; Chinese: 陳碧蘭; pinyin: Chén Bìlán) was a Chinese communist. Chen was one of the founders of the Chinese Trotskyist movement and was exiled in 1948. For the rest of her life, she was a leader of the exiled Chinese Trotskyists and a member of the Fourth International.

== Biography ==
Chen was born in Huangpo, Hubei province in 1902 to an affluent family. To escape from a forced marriage, she fled to Shanghai. In 1923, Chen became a communist and joined the Chinese Communist Party. She lived in Shanghai with Cai Hesen and Xiang Jingyu. In 1924, the Central Committee of the Chinese Communist Party sent Chen, Li Dazhao, and Zhang Tailei to Moscow. She was sent to study at the Communist University of the Toilers of the East. While studying there, she was able to meet with many other members of the Chinese Communist Party and hear speeches from the leader of the Russian Communist Party (Bolsheviks) and Comintern. In the spring of 1925, 13 labour demonstrators in Shanghai were killed by police, leading to a series of strikes and protests throughout China, and Chen subsequently travelled back to China. Back in Shanghai she became an editor under the Communist Party's propaganda department, which was headed by Peng Shuzhi. During this time, Peng and Chen began living together. Peng and Chen became major opponents of the party's continued entryism in the Kuomintang.

In November 1929, Chen Bilan was expelled from the CCP for supporting Trotsky's views regarding the CCP and the Chinese Communist Revolution. She continued working with other Chinese Trotskyists. To avoid the arrests of Trotskyists, she and her husband Peng Shuzhi and their three children left Shanghai in December 1948. They first lived in Hong Kong, then moved to Vietnam in January 1949. A year and a half later, in May 1951, after the arrest of a prominent Chinese Trotskyist in Vietnam, the family moved again to France. In 1973, the couple moved to the U.S. Chen Bilan died on September 7, 1987.

== Childhood ==
=== Women in Chen Bilan's family ===
Chen Bilan was born in 1902 in Taohua Villae in Huangpi County, Hubei. Bilan's mother, Jiang Qiuxian, lost her mother and was abused badly by her stepmother. Bilan thought the abuse made her mother an obedient person. Although Bilan's mother, Qiuxian, did not receive an education, Bilan thought her mother set an example by being an extraordinarily kind person. Bilan recalled that her mother always said yes to whoever asked to borrow money. If Bilan's mother did not have money, she would lend her gold earrings.

Bilan's grandmother from her father's side was from a wealthy family; although she did not receive an education, she was eloquent in her speeches and emphasized traditional ethics and rituals when educating her children. Bilan's grandmother once told Bilan that, after she had two daughters, she drowned three of her other daughters because she was dreadful of bounding their feet and was worried about the dowries she had to provide.

Bilan's two aunts---her father's sisters---both lost their husbands when they were in their twenties and thirties. They observed the traditional ethical code for widowed women and remained unmarried. After the husband died, Bilan's younger aunt and the aunt's young son became poor and went to live with Bilan's family and her grandparents. This aunt was skilled at embroidery and sold her works to many wealthy families when they wanted embroidered flowers for their daughters' dowries.

=== Father's influence ===
Bilan's grandfather, from her father's side, was a xiucai. Bilan's father, Chen Dezhao, also became a xiucai. But shortly after Dezhao received his xiucai title, the Imperial Exam was abolished. Realizing that the abolishment of the Imperial Exam nullified traditional career prospects, Dezhao followed suit with his wealthier cousins who went to Japan to study. When Bilan was three, her father, Dezhao, also traveled to Japan against his parents' will to further his studies.

When Bilan turned four, a typical age for girls to start the foot-binding practice, her father Dezhao repeatedly wrote home letters from Japan, forbidding other family members to bind Bilan's feet. Although no one in the family agreed with Bilan's father, Dezhao was resolute. He wrote in one letter: "If anyone dares to bind my daughter's feet, after I return, I will fight you with my life." Because of her father's intervention, Bilan's feet were not bound. In her memoir, Bilan considered this the first critical event setting her life for the future.

Bilan's father Dezhao returned from Japan when Bilan was six. Upon returning, Dezhao told the rest of Bilan's family members that he had decided to send Bilan to school. Dezhao said, according to Bilan's memoir, "My daughter will receive an education just as the boys. She will not learn about sewing and needlework. She will focus on her education. When she gets married, there won't be a dowry. The dowry money will be used for her education." In her memoir, Bilan wrote this decision from her father was the second most critical event that shaped her life.

== Political career ==
=== Becoming a Chinese Trotskyist ===
In 1924, the CCP, acting against Comintern's guidelines and Chen Duxiu, formed the First United Front Alliance with the Kuomintang. The Alliance was ended in April 1927 when Chiang Kai-shek decided to end it and killed many Communists. Before Chiang ended the Alliance, Trotsky advised the CCP to leave the Alliance. But even after Chiang ended the Alliance and started to kill many Communists, Stalin told the CCP to ally with the Wang Jingwei faction based in Wuhan, which the Soviet leaders called "revolutionary Kuomintang"." Trotsky disagreed with Stalin and called for the CCP to regain "complete independence" from the Kuomintang's Wang Jingwei faction. In July 1927, Wang Jingwei bailed on the CCP, slaughtered thousands, and ultimately agreed to unite with Chiang and serve under Chiang's Nanjing government.

In the summer of 1929, Chen Duxiu, carrying the two documents Trotsky wrote concerning the CCP's defeat in 1927, visited Chen Bilan and her husband Peng Shuzhi. Chen Duxiu and Peng Shuzhi said they agreed with Trotsky's assessment of the defeat of the CCP. They wanted to gather other Communist members who also disagreed with CCP decisions and organize the Left Opposition. Chen Duxiu and Shuzhi later wrote to the CCP's central leaders separately, requesting that the CCP recognize that its previous policies of the Alliance were wrong and that the CCP should make public Trotsky's documents commenting on the CCP and China's revolution.

At the time, Bilan firmly believed that, as a Communist Party member, even if one was critical of and disagreed with the Party, one should only voice criticisms within the Party but not set up another organization. Bilan believed so because, according to her memoir, she thought there was only one truth, and the Party was the truth. If one set up another organization to confront the Party, then it meant one denied the Party, and such actions would be against the Party's rules. As such, Bilan dismissed and disagreed with her husband Shuzhi's plan to organize the Left Opposition.

==== Comrade Chen Bilan or the wife of Peng Shuzhi? ====
After Chen Duxiu and Shuzhi's letters were sent to CCP's central leadership, Bilan learned from others that the CCP intended to expel the two men. She wrote in her memoir that she was "agonized" because she knew that if the Party expelled her husband, Shuzhi, the Party would also expel her unless she divorced Shuzhi. In the past, Bilan's status in the CCP was affected by her husband's position in the Party. Based on these prior experiences, Bilan wrote that she was deeply agonized. She explained that she thought she decided to join the CCP after studying related ideology. Her status in the Party was gained because she studied and worked hard, endured hardships, and took risks. Her status in the Party was not achieved through her marriage to Shuzhi, but she married Shuzhi because she got to know him through her work for the Party.

Bilan told Chen Duxiu her thoughts as she pondered whether she should divorce Shuzhi to avoid being expelled. Chen Duxiu told Bilan that he thought if he and Shuzhi were to be expelled, it was not because they betrayed the revolution but because the CCP had become corrupted. According to Bilan's memoir, Chen Duxiu told her, "If the Party expels me, I do not care." What Chen Duxiu said, Bilan wrote, greatly inspired her, and she decided to read the two documents Trotsky wrote. Previously, Bilan refused to read the documents as she believed there should not be an oppositional organization inside the Party. To her surprise, Bilan strongly agreed with what Trotsky wrote, and she became critical of why Stalin and Bukharin would prevent the Chinese Communists from reading Trotsky's writings. Bilan wrote in her memoir that from then on, she had become "an activist fighting for Trotskyist thoughts."

==== Expelled from the CCP ====
On November 15, 1929, Chen Duxiu and Peng Shuzhi---Bilan's husband---were expelled from the CCP on the grounds that they were Trotskyists and were against the CCP. In late November 1929, after meetings for three nights in which Bilan defended hers and Chen Duxiu and Peng Shuzhi's positions and criticized the CCP, she and several other Chinese Trotskyists were also expelled from the CCP.

Meanwhile, Chinese Trotskyists in Moscow were also rounded up by political police in the Soviet. A few were deported, some killed, and many more were transported to Siberia's labor camps.

== Work on female laborer issues ==
In 1932, Bilan was introduced to Cai Kui, editor of the Female Youth Monthly 女青年月刊, published by the All-China Young Women's Christian Association. Bilan started to write articles for the magazine discussing women's issues. Cai Kui commissioned Bilan to write a pamphlet for the Association's Labor Department. The pamphlet aimed to help female workers understand how capitalism created unequal conditions and how capitalists exploited and suppressed workers. It hoped to equip the female workers with plans and strategies for fighting against the capitalist system. Bilan's husband, Shuzhi, worked with her to write the pamphlet. The royalty the couple gained from writing the pamphlet helped them temporarily relieve their financial strains.

Several months after Bilan's husband Shuzhi was arrested, in April 1933, Bilan gave birth to the couple's second child. To help with the family's financial situation now that Shuzhi was in prison, Bilan took up a teacher's position Cai Kui introduced her. The job was at a school for female workers that the Shanghai Young Women's Christian Association had set up. The students at the school were all female workers from various manufacturing factories. The school hired a cook for the workers, and they were able to have more time and energy to study. Bilan wrote in her memoir that many of them had been studying at the school for two years before she was hired, and they could pen short articles. Bilan encouraged them to produce newspapers.

After teaching in the day, Bilan also visited female workers in their dorms. In her memoir, Bilan wrote that these visits to their dwellings were meaningful because, in the past, she only spoke to them in protests and at meetings but had never gone to their dorms to talk to them. She described that the female workers living conditions were crowded, unsanitary, and often horrendous. The female workers mostly ate only pickles, fermented bean curd, and porridge. And most worked for about 10 to 12 hours per day.

Bilan wrote that the most miserable were the female apprentices, most of whom were aged 15 to 19 and were hired from rural villages to Shanghai. Because these female apprentices were first hired by people who manage them and then hired out to factories, Bilan explained that these young girls suffered "double exploitation." The bosses who hired the teenage girls from the villages and managed them provided them with food and rooms for sleeping. The food and sleeping conditions were often poor. One girl Bilan spoke with said more than a dozen slept on the floor. "One by one. With no space. The room was tiny, hot, and stuffy," the girl told Bilan. These bosses also took away a large portion of the meager wages these girls received from factories.

== Exile and death ==
Bilan, her husband Shuzhi, and their children moved to Hong Kong in December 1948 to avoid arrest. But as other Chinese Trotskyists in Hong Kong fell under arrest, the family moved again, on January 19, 1950, to Vietnam. In her memoir, Bilan described the family's life in Vietnam as like "hell" because of a lack of financial support. After a year and a half of living in Vietnam, the Chinese Trotskyist Liu Jialiang was arrested, and Bilan and Shuzhi decided to move the family again. With help from other Chinese Trotskyists and friends, on May 26, 1951, the couple were able to take their daughter and younger son with them to flee to France. They had to leave their older son in Vietnam. In 1973, the couple moved to the U.S., where Chen Bilan had lived until she died in 1987.

== Writings ==
=== A Collection of Articles on Women's Issues (1935) ===
Under her pen name Chen Biyun, the book A Collection of Articles on Women's Issues she wrote (in Chinese) was published by the All-China Young Women's Christian Association in Shanghai in 1935. The book consists of 30 articles through which Bilan wrote on topics such as women's movements, women's attitudes towards sex, and women's roles in societies, families, and as workers, professionals, and mothers. The book also has three articles about Bilan's observation and analysis of women's education, political life, marriages, and sex life in the Soviet Union.

=== National Liberation War and Women (1938) ===
Also using her pen name, Chen Biyun, she wrote an article titled "National Liberation War and Women." The publishing house Yadong Library 亞東圖書館 published it as a pamphlet. In the article, Bilan wrote about her views on wars in general and how she thought Chinese women should act in China's war, resisting Japan's invasion.

=== Magazine writings (1946–1948) ===
After the Sino-Japanese war, Bilan penned about 40 articles for Chinese Trotskyist magazines Youth and Women 青年与妇女, New Voice 新声and Seeking Truth 求真杂志commenting on domestic and international affairs, and women's issues.

=== The Chinese Revolution (1972) ===
The National Education Department of the Socialist Workers Party in New York in 1972 published three pamphlets consisting of translated articles penned by Chen Bilan under the name Peng Bilan (Peng Pi-lan) and her husband Peng Shuzhi (Peng Shu-tse). Bilan's translated article "Looking Back Over My Years with Peng Shu-Tse" was published in the first pamphlet, The Chinese Revolution Part 1.

== Views ==
=== War ===
In the article "National Liberation War and Women" Bilan wrote in 1938, she summarized wars that broke out in modern times into the following categories. First, "reactionary" wars that were fought amongst imperialist empires, feudal nation-states, and warlords inside China. This kind of war was aimed at exploiting the masses in the lower social echelon and weak nations and allocating colonies. Second, "revolutionary" wars that were fought amongst different classes, such as the French Revolution in the 18th century and Russia's October Revolution. The revolutionary wars fought in Russia, Bilan wrote, were wars in which socialism was fighting against capitalism. The third type of war was for the liberation and independence of a nation, such as the Revolutionary War in the U.S., Belgium, and Turkey.

Bilan wrote that China's war resisting Japan was to fight for the nation's survival and was, by nature, revolutionary. She noted that Japan's imperialism was the most evil enemy China faced. If China could resist Japan until the end and win victory, Bilan wrote, the Chinese nation could gain freedom and liberation from imperialism forced onto China not only by Japan but also by other Western countries.

=== Chinese Women's roles in the Sino-Japanese War ===
Bilan wrote that women should shoulder the same responsibilities as men in the war fighting for national liberation. However, women's participation in such wars had special meanings because imperialist repression was dependent upon feudal repressions inside the nations. The British Empire's control of the masses in India and the Japanese Empire's colonization in Korea and Manchuria illustrate this point.

Bilan thought that because women's emancipation was closely related to the liberation of the laboring masses, liberating women meant that imperialism must be defeated. Women in Russia played pivotal roles in the revolution in 1917 and ensuing wars. In China, some women participated in the Xinhai Revolution and the May Fourth movement. Female students and workers joined protests. More women also organized and started movements. Although women's participation in revolutionary movements won them more rights, Bilan wrote, democratic movements and revolution in China became weak and aided "evil forces" to continue exploiting the masses, including women. This situation in China gave Japan an opportunity to invade China. Since women made up about half of China's entire population, Bilan wrote, they must join men to fight against Japan's invasion so that China would not perish.

Bilan summarized several weaknesses that Chinese women had in fighting against Japan's aggression. For instance, she wrote that women lacked effective organizations of their own to mobilize; existing women's organizations did not try to include female laborers from the lower classes. She wrote that because most Chinese women were deprived of opportunities to receive education, it was challenging to educate them about politics and political thoughts. Bilan proposed that women's organizations should pay special attention to female workers to address these issues. As the most oppressed group, Bilan believed that female workers harbored more resisting sentiments. And because they endured hard labor, female workers would be a strong force once organized. However, in reality, many female workers had to toil for long working hours for meager wages. Bilan suggested that organizations needed to help female workers address these issues to have more time and energy to participate in China's war of resisting Japan. Bilan also called for women to bear arms to fight in China's war resisting Japan.

=== The Cultural Revolution and Mao ===
In 1967, shortly after the start of the Cultural Revolution, Bilan in an interview expressed her thoughts on the movement and Mao. Bilan said that she thought the "Proletarian Cultural Revolution" was "theoretically absurd." She said:

When the proletariat takes power in a country, its greatest task is to overthrow the remaining capitalists in the world and complete the socialist revolution. Before the world capitalist class has been destroyed, it is impossible to construct a real proletarian culture. However, after the world socialist revolution has been completed, the proletariat itself will begin to disappear; that is, classes and, of course, class antagonisms will begin to disappear. It is at this point, then, that socialist culture will begin naturally to establish itself. Therefore, it is in no way necessary to establish a proletarian culture.

As such, Bilan viewed Mao's Cultural Revolution as both "theoretically absurd" and practically "foolish." She expressed that what China needed urgently was to help the illiterate masses become literate and increase their pay and living standards. However, Mao's policies made the working masses work longer hours without increasing benefits. She concluded that telling from Mao's campaign against "economism" and his policies' effects on the working masses, the working-class people only served as "instruments of production in the interests of the bureaucracy."

She said Mao's policies regarding literature and art in the Cultural Revolution were similar, but harsher and more restrictive, compared to Stalin's, which prohibited literature and art to "reflect the actual reality but became mere propaganda to praise the policies of the bureaucrats as well as them as individuals." Bilan said that she knew many Party cadres disagreed with Mao's policies, but under Mao's "personal dictatorship," these dissenting cadres "were forced to carry out Mao's decisions." Bilan expressed that the Proletarian Cultural Revolution was a tool through which Mao used to attack and purge his opponents and retain his "personal cult."

== Selected bibliography ==
- "The New Developments in the Chinese Situation". Marxists Internet Archive. 1969.
- "The Real Lesson of China on Guerrilla Warfare". Marxists Internet Archive. 1973.
- Benton, Gregor. Prophets Unarmed: Chinese Trotskyists in Revolution, War, Jail, and the Return from Limbo, Edited by Gregor Benton. Historical Materialism Book Series, Volume 81. Leiden, The Netherlands: Brill, 2015.
- Chen, Bilan 陳碧蘭. Zaoqi zhonggong yu tuopai: wode geming shengya huiyi 早期中共與托派：我的革命生涯回憶 [Early Chinese Communist Party and Trotskyists: Memoir of My Revolutionary Life]. Chu ban, 初版. Hong Kong: Tiandi tushu youxian gongsi 天地圖書有限公司, 2010.
- Peng Pi-Lan and Peng, Shu-tse. The Chinese Revolution, Education for Socialists. New York: National Education Dept., Socialist Workers Party, 1972.
- Chen, Biyun 陳碧雲. Funü wenti lunwen ji 婦女問題論文集 [A Collection of Articles on Women's Issues]. Shanghai: zhonghua jidujiao nüqingnian hui quanguo xiehui 中華基督教女青年會全國協會, 1935.
- Chen, Biyun 陳碧雲. Minzu jiefang zhanzheng yu funü 民族解放戰爭與婦女 [National Liberation War and Women]. Shanghai: yadong tushuguan 亞東圖書館, March, 1938.
- Marxists Internet's Ch'en Pi-Lan Internet Archive. "An Interview with Ch'en Pi-lan on the Cultural Revolution." https://www.marxists.org/archive/chen/chenongpcr.htm. (accessed December 11, 2023)
- Tong, Ren 同人. "Jingdiao wuchan jieji nügemingjia Chen Bilan敬悼无产阶级女革命家陈碧兰1902—1987 [Tribute to Proletarian Female Revolutionary Chen Bilan]. October Review 十月評論 1987, no: 129. https://www.marxists.org/chinese/chenbilan/mia-chinese-chenbilan-19870910.htm (accessed December 11, 2023)
- "Tuopai duoshupai kanwu 托派多數派刊物" [Magazines of the Majority Trotskyists]. https://www.marxists.org/chinese/reference-books/new-voice/index.htm. (accessed December 11, 2023)
