= Irwin D. Davidson =

American politician (1906–1981)

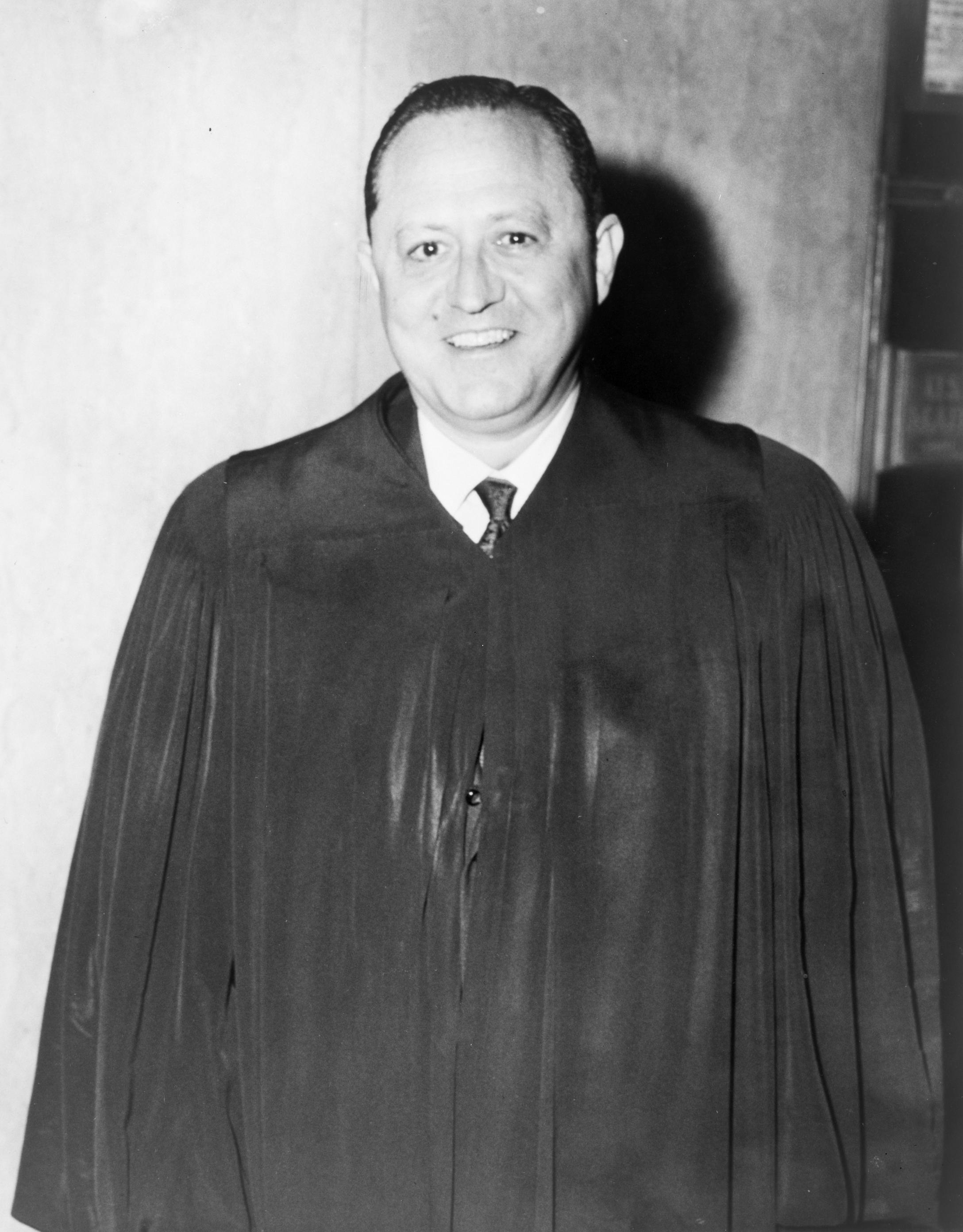

Justice of the New York Supreme Court
- In office 1963–1974

Member of the U.S. House of Representatives from New York's 20th congressional district
- In office January 3, 1955 – December 31, 1956
- Preceded by: Franklin D. Roosevelt, Jr.
- Succeeded by: Ludwig Teller

Member of the New York State Assembly
- In office 1936–1948
- Preceded by: William T. Middleton
- Succeeded by: Patrick H. Sullivan

Personal details
- Born: Irwin Delmore Davidson; January 2, 1906 New York City, United States
- Died: August 1, 1981 (aged 75) New Rochelle, United States
- Party: Democratic Party
- Other political affiliations: Liberal Party
- Education: New York University; New York University School of Law

Irwin Delmore Davidson (January 2, 1906 – August 1, 1981) was an American lawyer, jurist, and politician who served one term as a Democratic-Liberal member of the United States House of Representatives from New York from 1955 to 1956. He was also a justice on the New York Supreme Court from 1963 to 1974.

== Life ==
Davidson was born on January 2, 1906, in New York City. He graduated from New York University in 1927, and from New York University School of Law in 1928.

=== Political career ===
He was a member of the New York State Assembly in 1937.

He was again a member of the State Assembly from 1939 to 1948, sitting in the 162nd, 163rd, 164th, 165th and 166th New York State Legislatures.

=== Congress ===
He was elected to the 84th United States Congress, holding office from January 3, 1955, to December 31, 1956, when he resigned.

=== Judicial career ===
He was a justice of the New York Supreme Court from 1963 to 1974.

=== Death ===
He died at his home at Premium Point in New Rochelle, New York on August 1, 1981.

== See also ==
- List of Jewish members of the United States Congress

== Sources ==
- United States Congress. "Irwin D. Davidson (id: D000083)". Biographical Directory of the United States Congress.

New York State Assembly
Preceded by Saul S. Streit	New York State Assembly; New York County, 7th District; 1937	Succeeded by William T. Middleton
Preceded by [mWilliam T. Middleton	New York State Assembly; New York County, 7th District; 1939–1944	Succeeded by Patrick H. Sullivan
Preceded by Owen McGivern	New York State Assembly; New York County, 5th District; 1945–1948	Succeeded by Monroe Flegenheimer
U.S. House of Representatives
Preceded by Franklin D. Roosevelt, Jr.	Member of the U.S. House of Representatives from New York's 20th congressional district 1955–1956	Succeeded by Ludwig Teller
