= Chen Congying =

Chinese revolutionary

- 陈琮英
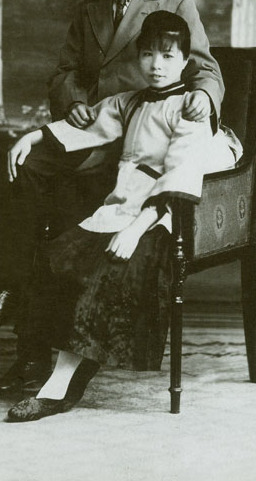
- Chen in 1926
- Born: January 1902; Changsha, Hunan, Imperial China
- Died: 31 May 2003 (aged 101); Beijing, China
- Spouse: Ren Bishi (m. 1926)
- Children: 9

Chinese name
- Simplified Chinese: 陈琮英
- Traditional Chinese: 陳琮英
Transcriptions
Standard Mandarin
- Hanyu Pinyin: Chén Cóngyīng

Chen Congying (Chinese: 陈琮英; pinyin: Chén Cóngyīng; January 1902 – 31 May 2003) was a Chinese revolutionary who took part in the Long March.

== Early life ==
Chen was born in Changsha, Hunan, in 1902, the start of the final decade of the Qing Dynasty. She was raised in a poor but literate family, and began binding her feet at a young age, per custom. She did not complete her foot binding, but her feet remained "a little bit crooked". As a young girl, she foraged for brushwood in the countryside. At age 12, she left her family to live with the Ren family, as her family had promised her in marriage to them as an infant. At age 14, she began working in a local factory which produced socks to help pay for her betrothed's education; here she was introduced to the working conditions of "China nascent working class".

== 1926-1949 ==
In 1926, Chen joined the Communist Youth League and married Ren Bishi (d. 1950). The couple's first two children died.

Chen joined Ren when he traveled to Moscow to attend the Sixth Executive Committee Meeting of the Young Communist International. Chen transported "important party instructions and documents" andcovered for her husband while he traveled for party business. This at times put her in peril. In 1928, Chen and her third child traveled from Shanghai to Changsha "to provide an alibi for Ren". The infant, who she had traveled with "in an open coal wagon", developed pneumonia and died.

In 1931, Chen was arrested, along with her fourth child, a daughter who was three months old at the time; she was imprisoned at Longhua prison for nearly a year. She was freed after authorities were convinced she was "an ignorant housewife". After being freed, she left her daughter, Yuanzhi, in the care of Ren's parents and traveled to Shanghai. From there, she traveled along the "Red Line" to Hong Kong, Shantou, and through Fujian to rejoin Ren. The two reunited in March 1932, and traveled together to Ruijin in Jiangxi. While in Ruijin, Chen worked to decipher telegrams. Chen joined the Communist Party herself in 1932. While continuing to do her intelligence work, Chen gave birth to two sons, one of whom was stillborn. Chen and Ren placed the living son, Xianggan, with a local family, knowing they would be leaving the area shortly on the Long March.

Shortly before the beginning of the Long March, Chen carried documents and codes during a reconnaissance mission with the Red Sixth Regiment. In August 1934, Chen and Ren began the Long March with the Sixth Army Group. Chen traveled with her husband and other Community Party leaders and continue to decipher telegrams. In November 1935, after about a year in place at the Hunan-Hubei-Sichuan-Guizhou Red Base, Chen and Ren left again with the Sixth Army Group. As the wife of a high-ranking official, Chen was "less likely to be left behind" as she had more information to give up under torture if she were caught by the Kuomintang. As such, she was able to use a horse while late in her seventh pregnancy. She was in her third trimester when the group climbed the Meili Snow Mountains in northern Yunnan. In June 1936, while on route, she gave birth to a daughter in a tent in Aba. She named her Yuanzheng, meaning Long March. When Yuanzheng was about a year old, Chen brought her to live with Ren's parents and her older daughter, Yuanzhi.

In 1938, Chen traveled to Moscow with Ren, "who was representing the Chinese party in the Communist International". She gave birth to another daughter, Yuanfang, while they were there. The couple left Yuanfang at the International Nursery in Moscow when they were ordered to return to China in 1940, figuring she would be safer in the Soviet Union. Her final child, Yuanyuan, was born in Yan'an later in 1940. In 1946, Chen brought her two older daughters, Yuanzhi and Yuanzheng, to Yan'an.

== Life in the People's Republic of China ==
Following the establishment of the People's Republic of China, Chen, her husband, and children Yuanzhi, Yuanzheng, and Yuanyuan moved to Beijing. In 1950, Ren was able to find Yuanfang in Moscow. Following Ren's death later that year, Chen was able to find the family she had placed her eldest son, Xianggan, with, but was told he had died in childhood.

Chen was a leader in the All-China Women’s Federation and a member of the Chinese People’s Political Consultative Conference.

Chen died in 2003 in Beijing, at the age of 101. She had nine children in total, four of whom survived childhood, and was survived by two of her daughters.
