= William Fitts Ryan =

American politician (1922–1972)

William F. Ryan
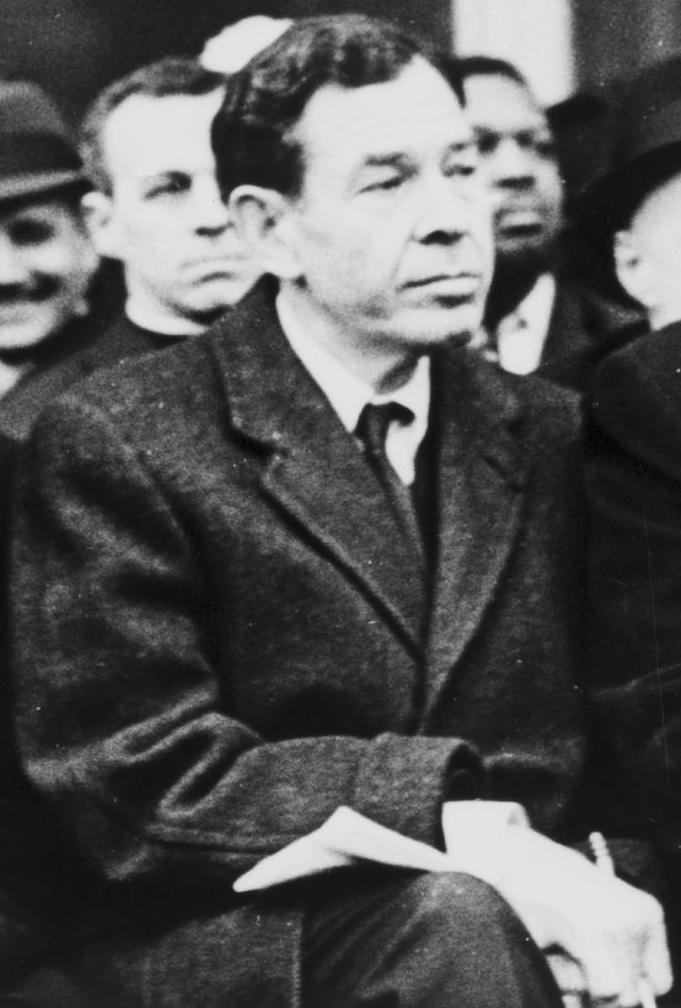
- Ryan in 1965

Member of the U.S. House of Representatives from New York's 20th district
- In office January 3, 1961 – September 17, 1972
- Preceded by: Ludwig Teller
- Succeeded by: Bella Abzug

Personal details
- Born: William Fitts Ryan; June 28, 1922 Albion, New York
- Died: September 17, 1972 (aged 50) New York City, New York
- Resting place: St. Thomas Church Cemetery in Croom, Maryland
- Party: Democratic

William Fitts Ryan (June 28, 1922 – September 17, 1972) was an American lawyer and politician. He served as a representative from New York in the United States House of Representatives from 1961 until his death from throat cancer in New York City in 1972. He was a member of the Democratic Party.

== Early life ==
Ryan was born in Albion, New York. His father, Bernard Ryan, was a judge on the New York Court of Claims, appointed by Governor Franklin D. Roosevelt. He attended Albion public schools for his elementary and secondary education, and graduated 1940 from the Woodberry Forest School in Virginia.

== Education and military service ==
Ryan entered Princeton University as member of Class of 1944. From 1943 to 1946 during World War II, he served in the United States Army in the South Pacific, as an artillery lieutenant in the Thirty-second Infantry Division. He graduated from the School of Public and International Affairs (now the Princeton School of Public and International Affairs) in 1947, and two years later, in 1949, he graduated from Columbia Law School. As part of his undergraduate degree, Ryan completed a senior thesis titled "New York State Labor Legislation and Alfred E. Smith." That same year, 1949, he was admitted to the bar and began his practice.

== Professional and legislative career ==
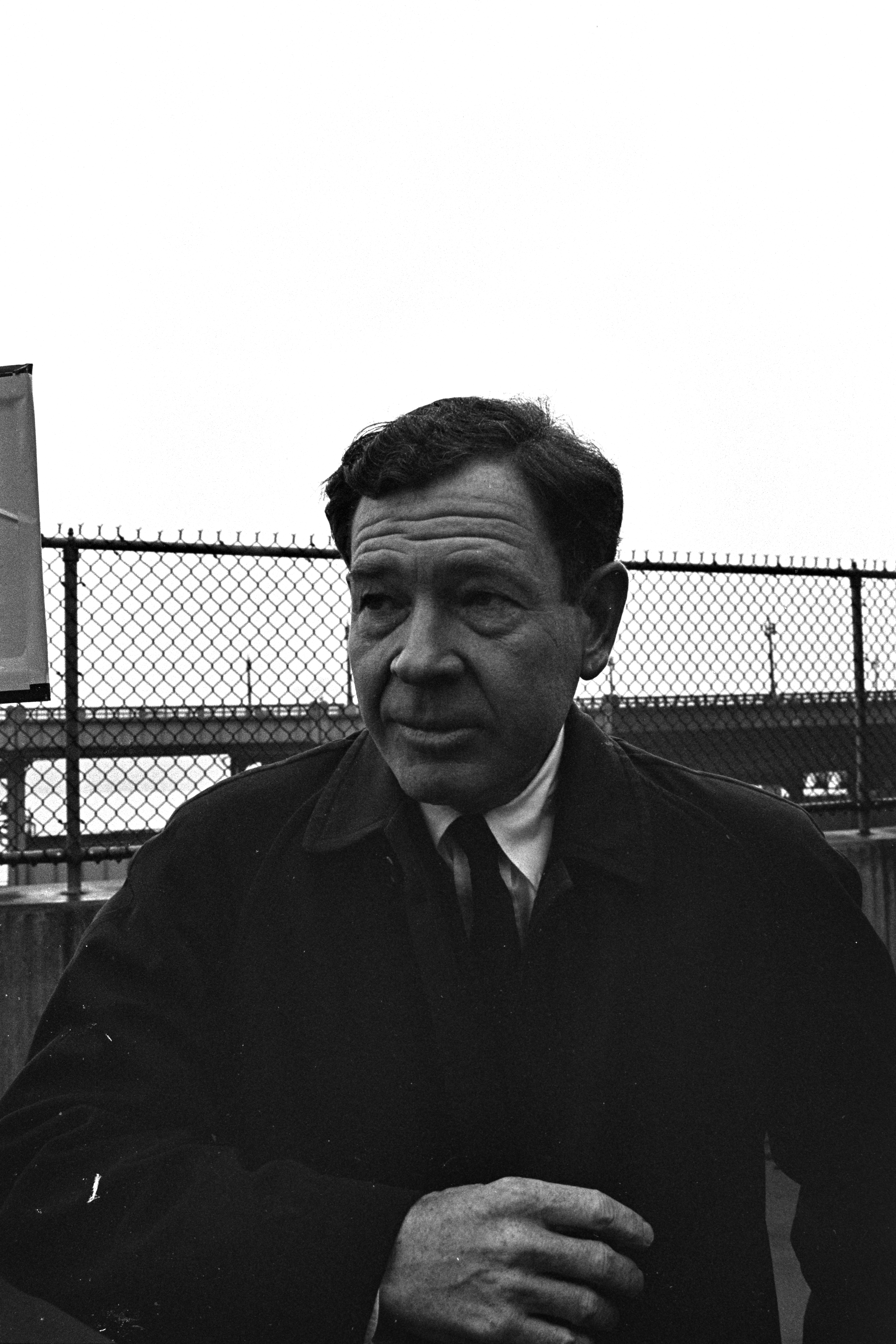
Ryan at the dedication of Freedom Place in Manhattan, named for slain civil rights activists James Chaney, Andrew Goodman, and Michael Schwerner, November 25, 1967

Ryan served as assistant district attorney in New York County from 1950 until 1957 and then again from 1957 until 1961.

=== Congress ===
In 1961, he was elected to Congress as a Democrat, representing Manhattan's Upper West Side, and was elected five more times.

Ryan was an early opponent of American involvement in the Vietnam War, being the first member of the U.S. House to speak out against the war, and was active in supporting civil rights. At the 1968 Democratic National Convention, he was chosen as a delegate from New York.

In 1965 Congressman Ryan was a candidate for the Democratic nomination for Mayor of New York City. With prominent support in the reform Democratic movement, he polled over 113,000 votes and finished third behind Abraham Beame and Paul Screvane. While he endorsed the Democratic ticket subsequent to his primary defeat, Republican-Liberal candidate John Lindsay was elected Mayor.

Congressman Ryan championed the creation of a unit of the National Park Service from historic properties and significant natural resources in the hands of the federal government around the New York City metropolitan area, with the intention of providing millions of local residents and visitors the opportunity to visit a unit of the National Park System who might never have the opportunity otherwise. The enabling legislation to create the result, Gateway National Recreation Area, was signed shortly after his death.

== Death ==
Redistricting following the 1970 census had put freshman representative Bella Abzug of the neighboring 19th district in the same district as Ryan. Abzug challenged the ailing Ryan in the Democratic primary. Ryan prevailed by a considerable margin, then died two months later of throat cancer in New York City on September 17, 1972. His widow, Priscilla Ryan, ran to succeed her late husband, and was defeated by Abzug in a special party convention to decide Ryan's replacement on the Democratic ballot. Priscilla Ryan then ran in the general election on the Liberal Party line, and again lost to Abzug. His brother, Hewitt Fitts Ryan, ran unsuccessfully for Congress in 1986 and 1990 in California's 45th congressional district.

Ryan was buried in St. Thomas Church Cemetery in Croom, Maryland.

The Ryan Health Center, a community health facility in Manhattan, New York City, is named after William F. Ryan.

== See also ==
- List of members of the United States Congress who died in office (1950–1999)

U.S. House of Representatives
Preceded by Ludwig Teller	Member of the U.S. House of Representatives from New York's 20th congressional district 1961–1972	Succeeded by Bella Abzug
