= 7th Politburo of the Chinese Communist Party =

7th electoral term of the Political Bureau of the Chinese Communist Party

The 7th Politburo of the Chinese Communist Party (CCP), formally the Political Bureau of the 7th Central Committee of the Communist Party of China, was elected at the 1st plenary session of the 7th Central Committee of the CCP on 19 June 1945 in the aftermath of the 7th National Congress. This electoral term was preceded by the 6th Politburo and succeeded by the 8th. Seven of the 15 members served concurrently in the 7th Secretariat.

== Composition ==
Members of the Political Bureau of the 7th Central Committee of the Chinese Communist Party
Officeholder		6th	8th	Birth	PM	Death	Birthplace	Offices held	Ref.
Chen Yun	陈云	Old	Elected	1905	1925	1995	Shanghai	Two: State offices; First-ranked Vice Premier of the People's Republic of China; Chairman, National Capital Construction Commission	
Deng Xiaoping	邓小平	5th PLE	Elected	1904	1924	1997	Sichuan	One: State office; Vice Premier of the People's Republic of China	
Dong Biwu	董必武	New	Elected	1886	1921	1975	Hubei	Two: Party office; Secretary, Central Supervisory Commission of the Central Committee; State offices; President, Supreme People's Court	
Gao Gang	高岗	New	4th PLE	1905	1926	1954	Shaanxi	One: State office; Chairman, State Planning Commission	
Kang Sheng	康生	Old	Alternate	1898	1925	1975	Shandong	Two: Organisational office; Vice Chairman, National Committee of the Chinese People's Political Consultative Conference; State office; Vice Chairman, Standing Committee of the National People's Congress	
Lin Biao	林彪	5th PLE	Elected	1907	1925	1971	Hubei	One: First-ranked Vice Premier of the People's Republic of China	
Lin Boqu	林伯渠	New	Elected	1886	1921	1960	Hunan	One: State office; Vice Chairman, Standing Committee of the National People's Congress	
Liu Shaoqi	刘少奇	Old	Elected	1898	1921	1969	Henan	Three: Party office; First Vice Chairman, Central Committee; State office; Vice Chairman of the Central People's Government; Chairman, Standing Committee of the National People's Congress	
Mao Zedong	毛泽东	Old	Elected	1893	1921	1976	Hunan	Three: Party office; Chairman, Central Committee; Military office; Chairman, Central Military Commission of the Central Committee; Chairman, National Defense Council; State office	
Peng Dehuai	彭德怀	Old	Elected	1898	1928	1974	Hunan	Two: State offices; Vice Premier of the People's Republic of China; Minister of National Defence	
Peng Zhen	彭真	New	Elected	1902	1923	1997	Shanxi	Two: Party office; Secretary, Beijing Municipal Party Committee; State office; Mayor, Beijing Municipal People's Government	
Ren Bishi	任弼时	Old	Died	1904	1922	1950	Hunan	One: Party office; Secretary-General, Central Committee Secretariat	
Zhang Wentian	张闻天	Old	Alternate	1900	1925	1976	Shanghai	One: State office; Ambassador of China to the Soviet Union	
Zhou Enlai	周恩来	Old	Elected	1898	1921	1976	Jiangsu	Three: Party office; Vice Chairman, Central Committee; State office; Premier, State Council of the People's Republic of China; Organisational office; Chairman, National Committee of the Chinese People's Political Consultative Conference	
Zhu De	朱德	Old	Elected	1886	1925	1976	Sichuan	One: State office; First Secretary, Central Commission for Discipline Inspection	
