= 3rd Central Leading Organisation of the Chinese Communist Party =

4th electoral term of the Central Bureau of the Chinese Communist Party

The 3rd Central Leading Organisation of the Chinese Communist Party (CCP) was elected by the 3rd Central Executive Committee (CEC) of the CCP in the aftermath of the party's 3rd National Congress. The term "Central Leading Organisation" encompasses all executive and work organs elected by the Central Executive Committee, and in this instance, means the Central Bureau and the Politburo elected by the 3rd CEC. This electoral term was succeeded by the 4th Central Bureau in 1925, in which the Politburo was discontinued.

== Composition ==
=== Central Bureau ===
Members of the Central Bureau of the 3rd Central Executive Committee of the Chinese Communist Party
Officeholder		4th	Birth	PM	Death	Birthplace	Ref.
Cai Hesen	蔡和森	Elected	1895	1921	1931	Shanghai	
Chen Duxiu	陳獨秀	Elected	1879	1921	1942	Anhui	
Luo Zhanglong	罗章龙	Not	1896	1921	1995	Hunan	
Mao Zedong	毛泽东	Not	1893	1921	1976	Hunan	
Tan Pingshan (Note: Tan Pingshan was a member from June until August 1923.)	譚平山	Not	1886	1921	1956	Guangdong	
Wang Hebo (Note: Wang Hebo was a member from August 1923 until January 1925.)	王荷波	Not	1882	1922	1927	Fujian	

=== Politburo (November 1924 – January 1925) ===
Members of the Political Bureau of the 3rd Central Executive Committee of the Chinese Communist Party
Rank	Officeholder		Birth	PM	Death	Birthplace	Ethnicity	Ref.
1	Chen Duxiu	陳獨秀	1879	1921	1942	Anhui	Han	
2	Cai Hesen	蔡和森	1895	1921	1931	Shanghai	Han	
3	Grigori Voitinsky	维经斯基	1893	Not	1953	Russian Empire	Russian	

== Bibliography ==
- Pavlov, Alexander (2012). Mao: The Real Story. I.B. Tauris. ISBN 978-1-4516-5447-9.
