= Bentley Kassal =

American politician

Judge Bentley Kassal

Personal details
- Born: February 28, 1917 New York City, U.S.
- Died: December 16, 2019 (aged 102)
- Party: Democrat and Liberal
- Spouse: Barbara Joan Wax Kassal
- Education: Townsend Harris High School (1933); University of Pennsylvania B.A. (1937); Harvard Law School LL.B (1940)
- Occupation: Litigation Counsel at Skadden, Arps, Slate, Meagher & Flom (1998 to date)
- Law School: Harvard University, 1940

Military service
- Branch/service: World War II veteran; Present at invasions of Gela, Sicily, Salerno, Italy, and St. Tropez, France; served 30 months overseas (1942–1945); Bronze Star Medal (1944); French Legion of Honor(Normandy, 2009)

Bentley Kassal (February 28, 1917 – December 16, 2019) was an attorney and litigation counsel with Skadden, Arps, Slate, Meagher & Flom in New York City. He was a New York State Assemblyman, a judge of the New York State Courts at every level, and a World War II veteran. An early rugby football player, he was a member of the 1940 Harvard Rugby Football team, which was the undefeated champion of the Eastern Rugby League. Kassal was married to Barbara Joan Wax Kassal, a retired business executive from Bonwit Teller in New York City.

== Early life ==
Kassal was born in the Harlem area of Manhattan, New York City, on February 28, 1917, to Pauline Nirenberg Kassal and Hyman Kassal, born in Poland and Austria, respectively. Kassal graduated from Public School 86 in the Bronx (1930), Townsend Harris High School in Manhattan (1933), the University of Pennsylvania, B.A. (1937) and Harvard Law School, J.D. (1940), where he received a merit scholarship for his third year. He was admitted to the New York State Bar in September 1940 and was an associate in two mid-sized law firms until the American entry into World War II.

Kassal was a member of the Townsend Harris High School soccer, track, and baseball teams. At the University of Pennsylvania, he was on the 150 lb. football team as a quarterback/linebacker until he fractured his left elbow. In 1940, his third year at Harvard Law School, he played rugby football as the left-wing on Harvard's undefeated Eastern League championship team and scored three tries. In 1941 he played the same position on the New York Rugby Club. After World War II he resumed playing tennis, golf, and skiing until 1998, when he had a double knee replacement. His original 1940 Harvard Rugby Jersey is on permanent exhibit at the Harvard Club in New York City together with his French Legion of Honor Medal Certificate and his photograph with his wife Barbara at Normandy with President and Michelle Obama.

== World War II and military awards ==
Kassal volunteered to serve in the U.S. Army Air Forces in January 1942. He spent six months at Mitchel Field, Long Island and was assigned to the Officer Candidate School in Miami Beach, Florida followed by the Air Combat Intelligence School in Harrisburg, Pennsylvania, graduating with honors from both.

On March 15, 1943 Life magazine published a letter to the editor, written by Kassal, in which he wondered "what formula" enlisted war hero Herman J. F. Bottcher used to "secure his rapid promotion" from the rank of sergeant to captain in the span of one week. The editors of Life replied: "Heroism". Bottcher was later killed in action in Leyte. Letters appearing in the following two issues were critical of Kassal's question, and accused him of being a jealous "90-day wonder"—a disparaging term used for newly minted officers from upper-class families who went through accelerated officer programs as Kassal did.

As a second lieutenant, Kassal was assigned to the Mediterranean Theater of Operations. After three months in an officer replacement center in Algeria, he was assigned by the Seventh Army to assist in the planning and to participate in the D-Day landings at Gela, Sicily. He arrived on the U.S.S. Orizaba as part of the Second Armored Division's initial landing force. Two months later, he was chosen to assist in planning and land on D-Day with the Fifth Army at Salerno, Italy, on a Landing Ship, Tank. He briefed General Mark W. Clark on the Salerno beach. After the capture of Naples, he again planned air intelligence missions. With President Franklin D. Roosevelt's approval, he helped plan the air bombardment of the Montecassino Abbey, which was occupied by German artillery units and blocked the passage to Rome. Cardinal Secretary of State Luigi Maglione told senior U.S. diplomat to the Vatican Harold Tittmann that the bombing was "a colossal blunder [...] a piece of a gross stupidity." (Hapgood & Richardson, p. 225). The only people killed in the monastery were Italian civilians seeking refuge in the abbey.

When the occupation of Italy was almost complete, Kassal returned to Naples for the Seventh Army invasion at St. Tropez, France, on August 15, 1944. He briefed General Patch. Shortly thereafter, he accepted the surrender of seventeen German soldiers at Salon-en-Provence. The troops in Southern France moved north through Alsace-Lorraine, where they were caught in the midst of the Battle of the Bulge and General Patton's counter-attack. Thereafter, Kassal's unit moved through Bavaria and was at Augsburg when D-Day was declared. Because of his knowledge of the Luftwaffe, Kassal was assigned to London to prepare for the invasion of Japan, since it was anticipated that German pilots would be part of the Japanese air defense.

Kassal was awarded the Bronze Star with three Bronze Arrowheads for three invasion landings and was awarded seven Campaign ribbons in the European Theatre. His clearance was "Top Secret", the highest intelligence classification, and received intelligence data from the "Ultra Secret" classification. He served in the Army Air Forces for four years and served overseas for 30 months in North Africa, Sicily, Italy, France, and Germany before his discharge on December 31, 1945, with the final rank of captain. He was a major in the U.S. Air Force Reserves. On June 5, 2009, he received the French Legion of Honor from French Defense Minister Hervé Morin at Les Invalides in Paris, with a ceremony at Colleville-sur-Mer (Omaha Beach) Normandy. He and his wife were photographed at the same location with President and Michele Obama on June 6, 2009. On July 16, 2009, he was awarded membership in the American Society of French Legion of Honor.

He has given talks about his World War II overseas experience at the Harvard Club, the New York City Bar Association (2009), the Harding Club at Poughkeepsie, N.Y. (2009), at Skadden Arps' New York offices (2008 and 2009) and Skadden, Arps' London office in May 2010.

Kassel donated several war mementos to the Museum of Jewish Heritage in New York City for its permanent exhibit "Ours to Fight For." This exhibit has been shown in several U.S. cities. Donated items include several Nazi daggers and swords, his two-volume hand-written personal diaries, and his video oral testimony. He has also donated World War II mementos, including photos of invasions, prisoner of war camps, targets and German equipment, to the U.S. Air Force Museum at Wright-Patterson Air Force Base, Ohio.

== Political and legislative career (1946–1962) ==
Immediately after the war Kassal became active in liberal causes such as the Americans for Democratic Action, the American Veterans Committee, the Draft Eisenhower Movement (for the Democratic nomination), and Volunteers for Stevenson. He joined the local anti-Tammany Democratic Club and lost a contested primary for the State Assembly (1950). He was a member of the New York State Assembly (New York Co., 5th D.) from 1957 to 1962, sitting in the 171st, 172nd and 173rd New York State Legislatures. As an assemblyman, Kassal was regarded as one of the most liberal legislators. As his assembly district included the Lincoln Center of the Arts, he introduced and had enacted into law the first Arts Council in the United States. He was the only legislator to vote against the annual re-enactment of the Security Risk Law, which mandated that all state employees execute loyalty oaths during the Cold War. In 1962, he unsuccessfully challenged the incumbent Congressman Leonard Farbstein in the Democratic primary of the 19th District, but was nominated on the Liberal ticket. In November 1962, he was defeated by Farbstein, and resumed his law practice as a single practitioner. In 1969, Kassal won the Democratic primary for a seat on the New York City Civil Court.

== Legal career (1940–1969) ==
As a single practitioner, his specialties were civil litigation, real estate, estates, and matrimonials. His sole criminal matter was representing comedian Lenny Bruce on his arraignment on obscenity charges at Cafe Au Gogo in Greenwich Village. During almost this entire period, he was a regular guest commentator on radio night talk shows, first with Barry Gray on WMCA and then with Long John Nebel on WOR.

== Judicial career (1970–1993) ==
Serving in the Civil Court of the City of New York for six years (1970–1976), he was the judge assigned to establish the Housing Court. He also introduced the Small Claims Court into the State of Israel. He served in the New York Supreme Court for six years and was appointed by Governor Hugh Carey to the Appellate Division of the Supreme Court, First Department, in 1987, where he served for 12 years. During this period, he was appointed by Chief Judge Sol Wachtler to serve for the April/May 1985 term at the New York Court of Appeals, the State's highest court. He acted as a Special Judge to try judges for ethical violations and recommended significant sanctions, including removal, for several judges.

He has a total of 259 reported decisions. In the appeal on the America's Cup Race trial decision, he wrote a dissent in favor of the New Zealand team based primarily on sportsmanship, fair play, and equity in that, although not violative of any specific rules, holding that the use by the United States of a catamaran was contrary to the spirit of the race since no catamaran had ever been raced previously and, critically, no catamaran had ever lost to a single-hulled sailboat.

In Morgan v. Morgan, on the basis of equity, fairness and justice, he ruled in favor of providing maintenance to the wife who had supported her husband while he completed his legal education and became an attorney. She had sought similar support while a pre-medical and medical student. Although reversed on appeal, shortly thereafter the Equitable Distribution Law was enacted providing for this form of relief. The woman later became a doctor and a photo article with Kassal was published in The New York Times.

In People v. Shelton, his decision, the first to interpret the statutory language "Extreme Emotional Disturbance" in a jury charge as mitigation on a murder charge, was affirmed by the Court of Appeals. In Gordon v. American Museum of Natural History, his opinion at the Appellate Division, requiring actual or constructive notice of a physical condition as a condition for negligence liability, was affirmed by the Court of Appeals. In 1976, as a Civil Court Judge, he decided, in Parkwood v. Marcano, that a landlord has a duty to mitigate damages upon a tenant's default, similar to all contract damages. This was reversed on appeal. On April 22, 2003, he acted as amicus for Brennan Center for Justice (NYU) in filing a brief at the New York Court of Appeals supporting stringent ethical rules for Judges.

== Later career ==
From 1998, he was a counsel in the litigation department at Skadden, Arps, Slate, Meagher & Flom LLP. He was an annual reporter from 2004 for the New York State Bar Association Journal on the subject of appellate statistics.

In his third five-year term on the Advisory Committee on Judicial Ethics (Office of Court Administration) Committee on Character and Fitness (Appellate Division, First Department) Mayor's Committee on City Marshals, Special Master, Pre-Argument Conferences (Appellate Division, First Department), Lecturer on Active Post-Judicial Legal Retirement (Supreme Court Justices and NY State Bar Association) Annual Article, N.Y.S.B.A. Journal on Appellate Statistics, published every year since 2002.

He was a Traphagen Distinguished Alumni Speaker at Harvard Law School on three occasions. He delivered a talk about his career and 70 years of changes in the practice of law at Oxford University Faculty of Law on May 13, 2010. He and his wife were special guests at the Dinner for Legal Academics on May 11, 2010, at the Inner Temple of the Inns of Court in London.

On May 29, 2010, at Cambridge, the 1940 Harvard undefeated Eastern Rugby League championship team was honored by the Harvard Rugby Football Club. Kassel's 1940 football jersey is on permanent exhibition at the Harvard Club in New York City. On May 20, 2010, he photographed the Jewish cemetery in Oxford and obtained historical data for the Jewish Heritage Research Center regarding the flooding destruction of three synagogues in Bath, England in 1938. On January 9, 2009, the New York City Bar Association presented as its bi-annual program, "Twentieth Century Traveler: The Life and Perilous Times of the Hon. Bentley Kassal."

He testified as an expert witness on New York law pertaining to pre-nuptial agreements in London at the High Court of Justice in 2003. he acted as a neutral arbitrator, appointed by Movie Fone, in the A.A.A. arbitration Ticketmaster v. Movie Fone, in 1996. He was a member of the London Court of International Arbitrators (2005) and was a lecturer at NITA programs (2005).

== Pro bono photographer ==
Kassel has undertaken 81 photographic missions throughout the world, covering 158 countries. The New York State Bar Association Journal featured an article about an exhibition of Kassal's photographs. On April 12, 2010, he took photographs at the Statesville, North Carolina Synagogue for the Jewish Heritage Research Center (Syracuse University).

He has taken photographs for 17 charities, including Save the Children, UNICEF, World Monuments Fund, Human Rights Watch, the Asia Society, the International Survey of Jewish Monuments, the Coalition for Soviet Jewry, and United Jewish Appeal.

His photos have appeared on numerous occasions in the media. His photo for Save the Children remained on its poster for more than ten years. He has also exhibited at the City Bar Association and several court houses. In June 2009, at the age of 92, he took photos of three synagogues at Nice, Carpentras and Cavallion in France and three synagogues in North and South Carolina. He has had a special photo exhibit at the Save the Children headquarters, "Beyond the Bench." In January 2000, the Association of the Bar of the City of New York presented an exhibition of Kassal's photography. His photograph of the original Buddha Statue is featured in the "Vanishing Histories" published by the World Monuments Fund.

On September 11, 2001, from the 48th floor of Skadden's Times Square office, he photographed the second plane crash within minutes after the incident and, took more photos at the scene two days later.

== Pro bono photos published ==
- World Monument Fund – Spring-Summer 2001 issue: Buddha Statue in Afghanistan". The Buddha Statue was subsequently destroyed by the Taliban but it is being rebuilt by a Basel, Switzerland museum, based upon the previous photo by Kassal
- New York Observer – June 3, 2002
- Asia Society – February, 1982 "Tiger's Nest". Tiger's Nest in the Himalayan Kingdom of Bhutan, a monastery built on the side of a sheer cliff.
- Save the Children – Poster Child. This photo was taken outside of Beirut during the Christmas holidays. Kassal had an hour and a half provided to him by the local representative for photos. This became the official Save the Children poster and remained so for more than twenty years. The image appeared in N.Y. Times Magazine, Saturday Review World, Newsweek, Natural History, The New Yorker, Times of Israel, National Jewish Weekly and Unitarian Universalist.

== Human rights assignments and pro bono activities ==
- Joint Distribution Committee of the United Jewish Appeal (July, 1975)
- Coalition to Free Soviet Jews (1983 and 1985)
- International Rescue Committee (1983 and 1986)
- Human Rights Watch (1986, 1988 and 1989)
- Lawyers Committee for Human Rights (1990)

In 2002 Kassel participated in the construction of model house at Grand Central Station for Habitat for Humanity.

== Personal life ==
On June 13, 1986, Kassal married Barbara Joan Wax, a retired Bonwit Teller executive. They had no children and lived on the Upper West Side of Manhattan in New York City. He turned 100 in February 2017 and died in December 2019 at the age of 102.

== Bibliography ==
Published letters to the editor of The New York Times
August 17, 2000 – "60 Years of Progress" (nomination of Joseph L. Lieberman for Vice-President)
October 18, 2001 – "The War Over There"
August 25, 2002 – "Another Dirty Trick" (Sports Section)
March 7, 2003 – "Judges and Politics"
October 16, 2003 – "The Pledge: Recite or Rewrite?"
December 25, 2003 – "Lenny Bruce, Vindicated at Last"
April 3, 2006 – "Mandatory Retirement Age for Judges"

Articles About Bentley Kassal
Knickerbocker Times – March, 1960, "voted one of the 10 best dressed State legislators"
New York Times – "Focusing on the Children of the World" – October 2, 1981 by Judge Klemesrud
New York Times – February 21, 2010, "Senior Counsel, Very Senior Counsel" (Metropolitan Section)
"Controversial Alimony Case Ends Happily with a Degree (Morgan v. Morgan) by Georgia Dullea
New York Law Journal – July 26, 2002 – "Short Note for Review in Lawyers Bookshelf" pertaining to "The Courage of Strangers" by Jeri Laber
New York Law Journal – February 28, 1992 – Article – "Foreign Correspondence – a Judge's Odessa File" with photo, discussion of Odessa court system with local judges in Odessa
New York Law Journal – March 7, 2003 – "Judges and Politics" supporting the rule excluding judges in political activities

December 9, 2005 – Article – "Conversations with Bentley Kassal" by Tom Adcock

AM Law Daily – June 5, 2009 – "Skadden's Bentley Kassal Honored at 65th Anniversary of Normandy Invasion"

Articles published by Bentley Kassal
New York Times – September 10, 1980 – "Problems Judges Face" (with Mr. Justice Peter J. McQuillan)(Op-Ed)

== Pro bono activities ==
Discussion ongoing: This section has been proposed for deletion; please see the discussion on this article's talk page.

- Construction of model house at Grand Central Station for Habitat for Humanity (2002)
- Presided over moot court for Clinton Public School (Manhattan) 2009, 2010 and 2011 (Skadden project)
- Construction of book shelves at Hurits Point Middle School (January 18, 2002) (Skadden project)
- Painted walls (and photography) at I.S. 292, Brooklyn, on Martin Luther King Day (January 17, 2011) (Skadden project)
- At Mass Moca Museum, North Adams, MA on September 8, 2007 – research and photographs for pro bono litigation (Skadden project)
- Post-Judicial Retirement Seminars at New York State Bar Association of Supreme Court Justices (2007, 2008 and 2009)
- "Out the Door but Not Over the Hill" – N.Y. State Bar Association program (Albany and N.Y. City), May 6 and 14, 2008
- Mentor at Harvard Law School Connect – for students and graduates (2011)
- New York County Lawyers Association – Task Force on Transitioning and Unemployed Lawyers (2011)
- Donated 69 pints of blood to New York Blood Center
- On April 21, 2003, on behalf of the N.Y.U. Brennan Center for Justice, presented amicus brief to Court of Appeals upholding the N.Y. Canons of Judicial Ethics

== Human rights assignments ==
- World Monuments Fund – Afghanistan (1971)
- Joint Distribution Committee of the United Jewish Appeal (July, 1975)
- Coalition to Free Soviet Jews (1983 and 1985)
- International Rescue Committee (1983 and 1986)
- Human Rights Watch (1986, 1988 and 1989)
- Lawyers Committee for Human Rights (1990)

== Professional committees and bar associations ==
- Committee on Character and Fitness (1993 – present)
- Advisory Committee on Judicial Ethics (1993 – present)
- Mayor's Committee on City Marshals (1993 – present)
- Special Master, Pre-argument Conferences – Appellate Division, Supreme Court, First Dep't. (1993 – present)
- Association of the Bar of the City of New York (1953 – present)
- New York State Bar Association (2000 – present)
- Entertainment Committee – City Bar Association (1975 – present)

New York State Assembly
Preceded by Ludwig Teller	New York State Assembly; New York County, 5th District; 1957–1962	Succeeded by Albert H. Blumenthal
