= Ren Bishi =

Chinese military and political leader (1904–1950)

- 任弼时

Secretary General of the Politburo of the Chinese Communist Party
- In office 19 June 1945 – 27 October 1950
- Chairman: Mao Zedong
- Preceded by: Qu Qiubai
- Succeeded by: Deng Xiaoping

Secretary of the Central Committee of the Chinese Communist Party
- In office July 1928 – 27 October 1950

Head of the Organization Department of the Chinese Communist Party
- In office January 1933 - March 1933
- Preceded by: Huang Li
- Succeeded by: Kang Sheng

First Secretary of the Communist Youth League of China
- In office May 1927 – June 1928
- Preceded by: Zhang Tailei
- Succeeded by: Guan Xiangying

Personal details
- Born: 30 April 1904 Hunan, Qing Empire
- Died: 27 October 1950 (aged 46) Beijing, China
- Party: Chinese Communist Party (1922–1950)
- Spouse: Chen Congying (m. 1926)
- Education: Communist University of the Toilers of the East
- Occupation: Military and Political Leader

Ren Bishi
- Traditional Chinese: 任弼時
- Simplified Chinese: 任弼时
Transcriptions
Standard Mandarin
- Hanyu Pinyin: Rén Bìshí
- Wade–Giles: Jen Pi-shih

Ren Bishi (Chinese: 任弼时; pinyin: Rén Bìshí; Wade–Giles: Jen Pi-shih; 30 April 1904 – 27 October 1950) was a military and political leader in the early Chinese Communist Party (CCP).

In the early 1930s, Ren commanded the Fifth Red Army and was a central figure in the Hunan-Jiangxi Soviet, but he was forced to abandon his base after being pressured by Chiang Kai-shek's Fifth Encirclement Campaigns. In October 1934 Ren and his surviving troops joined the forces of He Long, who had set up a base in Guizhou. In the command structure of the new Second Front Army, He became the military commander and Ren served as its political commissar. Under threat from advancing Kuomintang troops, Ren and He were forced to retreat and went on to participate in the Long March in 1935. During the Second Sino-Japanese War, Ren was the representative of the CCP at the Communist International and the Secretary of the Central Committee of the Chinese Communist Party.

Ren was considered a rising figure within the CCP until his death at the age of 46. He was the fifth most senior party member of the 7th Politburo of the Chinese Communist Party before his death.

== Biography ==
=== Early life ===
Ren Bishi was born in rural Hunan to a teacher's family. He entered Hunan First Normal University in 1915 and collaborated with Mao Zedong to set up the Russian Research Center at the school in 1920. In the same year, he also joined the youth wing of the soon-to-be Chinese Communist Party in Shanghai. In May 1921, Ren and five others - including Liu Shaoqi and Xiao Jinguang - embarked on a chartered trip to the Soviet Union, going around Nagasaki, Vladivostok and the White movement blockade. Arriving in August 1921, the six of them entered the Communist University of the Toilers of the East. Ren joined the Chinese Communist Party in 1922 and replaced Qu Qiubai as the translator of the history of Western revolutionary movements. After completing his studies on 23 July 1924, he arrived in Shanghai in August 1924 after a train ride through Siberia and a chartered boat from Vladivostok. Under the orders of the Party, Ren was appointed to be a lecturer of the Russian language at Shanghai University. He was appointed to the Zhejiang and Anhui District Committee in 1924 and was responsible for publications such as China Youth, Mission Journal and Friends of Civilians.

In January 1925, Ren attended the Socialist Youth League of China's Third National People's Congress as the praesidium and changed the organization's name from "Socialist Youth League" to the "Chinese Communist Youth League". With Zhang Tailei being posted elsewhere in May 1925, Ren was appointed the First Secretary of the Communist Youth League, in charge of leading the May Thirtieth Movement. Despite the failure of the movement, Ren was able to consolidate and utilise the Youth League to vastly expand its membership soon after. In early April 1926, he married Chen Congying in Shanghai. Ren left for Moscow to attend the Communist Youth International Executive Committee Sixth Plenum in October and stayed in the Soviet Union until March the following year.

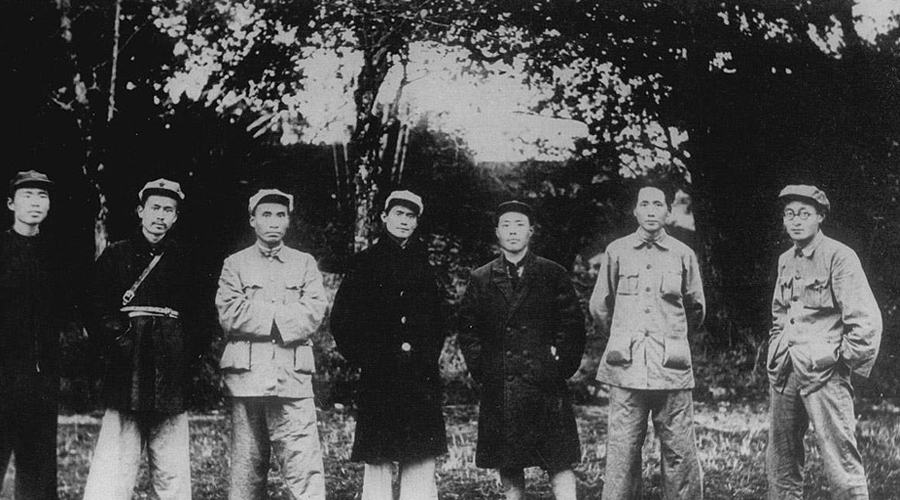
November 1931 photo of the leaders of the CCP. Left to Right: Guzuo Lin, Ren Bishi, Zhu De, Deng Fa, Xiang Ying, Mao Zedong, Wang Jiaxiang

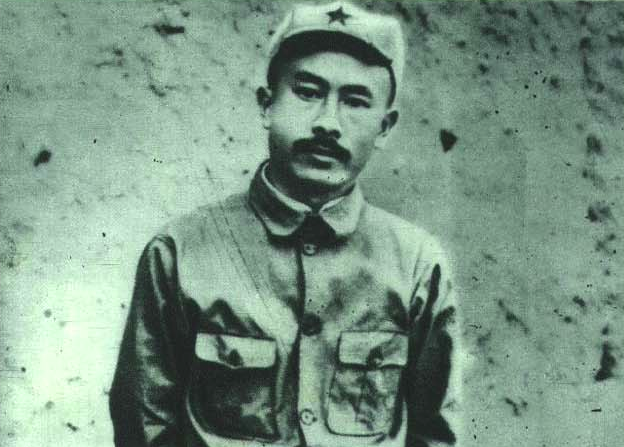
Ren during the Long March

Following the 1927 White Terror, Ren was elected to become a member of the Central Committee while retaining his secretariat in the Communist Youth League. With the end of the First-United Front Ren sided with Mao Zedong against Chen Duxiu in August 1927 to support the idea of initiating a peasant-based revolution in China. Soon after, Ren was able to gain temporary membership of the Politburo.

=== First Chinese Civil War (1927–1936) ===
On 15 October 1928, Ren was arrested by the local warlord in Nanling County, Anhui Province while attempting to attend a meeting by the Communist Youth League. Although Ren was released by the end of 1928, his son caught pneumonia and died.

In January 1929, he was appointed Minister of the CCP Central Committee and head of propaganda in the Jiangxi Soviet. On 13 August, he was made the temporary secretary of the Jiangxi Soviet, tasked to set up Today News, Education Week and Shanghai Daily. He was detained again on 17 November when attending a municipal meeting organized by the CCP. Even under electrocution and torture, Ren did not provide any confession to the police. As a response to his detainment, Zhou Enlai acted as the negotiator and was able to secure a prison term for Ren and even managed to reduce the term to secure his release by 25 December 1929. In April and September, he was appointed the party secretary in Hubei and Wuhan. In the same year, he was recalled to Shanghai following the failure of the uprising initiated by Li Lisan in Nanjing.

Ren was reelected as a Politburo member on 7 January 1931 during the extended Fourth Plenary Session of the CCP. On 7 November, during the First Session, he was elected a member of the Central Executive of the Chinese Soviet Republic. Following the shift of communist influence from Shanghai to the Jiangxi region, Ren protected many party members such as Zhang Aiping who were implicated during the "Anti-Bolshevik League incident".

During the Fourth Encirclement Campaign against Jiangxi Soviet, Ren was a proponent of direct assault and was highly critical of Mao's guerrilla strategy. During the Ningdu Conference in October, Mao was replaced by Zhou Enlai as the West Army Commander and was criticized by Ren during the same time. In lieu of his actions against Mao, in the 7th Plenary Session of the CCP, Ren admitted that his actions were wrong and the result of a "moment of sectarian activity".

Due to Bo Gu and others adopting Wang Ming's left-leaning stance of party ideology, Ren was forced to transfer from his post in the Soviet Central Bureau of Organization Department to become the party secretary in the Hunan–Jiangxi Soviet. Upon his appointment, he was faced with critical problems such as the Fifth Encirclement Campaign against Jiangxi Soviet and the rebuilding of party elements following counter-insurgency plans. He halted the counter-revolutionary plans and released Wang Shoudao, Zhang Qilong and others to expand the Red Sixth Army to the Sixth Army Group. In December, he replaced Cai Huiwen and was appointed the Political Commissar of the Hunan–Jiangxi Soviet.

In August 1934, accompanying Red Sixth Army commanders Xiao Ke and Wang Zhen, Ren organized a successful Westward march to retreat from the increasing unsuccessful defense in the Hunan-Jiangxi Soviet. Ren met with the Red Third Army on 24 October 1934 in Yinjiang Tujia and Miao Autonomous County, Guizhou and formed the Red Second Army Group under the command of He Long. Even though this army group managed to retain control over parts of Hunan and Hubei, Chiang Kai-shek's National Revolutionary Army adopted a multi-pronged conventional assault which forced the retreat of Communist forces. By November, Ren, He Long and Guan Xiangying were able to break out of the military blockade established by Chiang's army in Sangzhi, Hunan through a joint command of the Second and Sixth armies and proceeded on with the Long March.

On 2 July 1936, Ren's Second and Sixth Army Groups met with the Red Fourth Army led by Zhang Guotao and Xu Xiangqian in Sichuan, Garzê. Ren was then the political commissar of the Red Second Army. With the end of the Long March in October, Ren and Peng Dehuai were appointed the Political Commissars for the Front Command of the CCP to resist Hu Zongnan's forces that were in Shaanxi. By December, was a member of both the Revolutionary Military Commission of the CPC Central Committee and the Presidium.

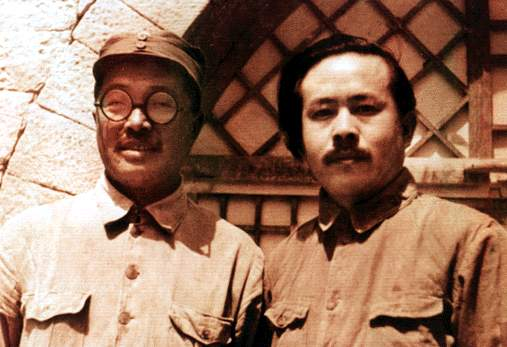
He Long and Ren Bishi during the Seventh Congress of the Chinese Communist Party in 1945

=== During the Second Sino-Japanese War (1936–1945) ===
In January 1931, Peng Dehuai and Ren alongside Yang Hucheng went to Xi'an to plan the front line defense against the Japanese forces through mobilizing the Seventh Route Army and the Northeast Army. During August, he was a member of the Central Military Commission which oversaw the renaming of Communist forces to become the Eighth Route Army. By 16 October, Ren was head of the Political Department of the Eighth Route Army and the CPC Central Military Commission.

In 1938, he attended the CPC Central Military Commission North Branch's meeting. In March, he was sent by the CCP Central Committee to negotiate with the Comintern in Moscow. In July, he officially replaced Wang Jiaxiang as the representative of CCP at Comintern. Ren returned to Yan'an on 26 March 1940, serving in the Secretariat and the Organizational Department of the CCP. In April 1942, he led the Yan'an Rectification Movement in the Shaan-Gan-Ning border region. Ren, alongside Mao and Liu Shaoqi as members of the Organizational Department of the CCP, became in charge of the northwest regions of Gansu-Ningxia and Shaanxi, and in the same month, was in charge of organizing the 8th Route Army based in Xi'an. Ren was part of a team that concluded the leadership problems between the Fourth Plenary Session and the Zunyi Conference in the "Resolution on Certain Questions in the History of the CCP" report.

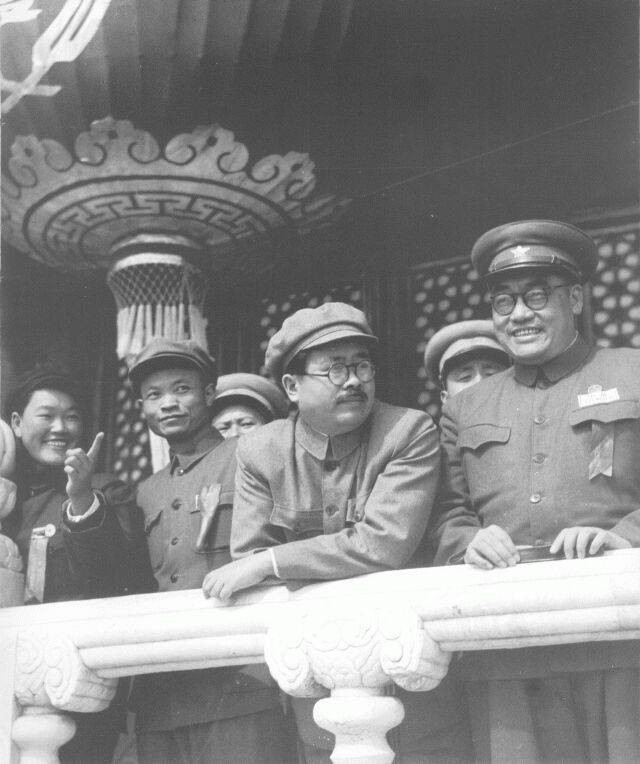
Ren (leaning on railing) attending the first anniversary celebrations of the PRC at Tiananmen on October 1, 1950 - a month before his death

=== During the Second Chinese Civil War (1945–1949) ===
During the Seventh National Congress of the Chinese Communist Party in March 1945, Ren was elected as a Politburo member of CPC Central Committee and the party's Central Secretary-General. As part of the Politburo Standing Committee of the Communist Party, he was preceded by only Mao Zedong, Liu Shaoqi, Zhou Enlai and Zhu De. In late November, Ren was diagnosed with serious illness by a doctor sent under the orders of Stalin, which reduced his participation in daily party politics. On 26 August 1946, Ren began drafting his proposal on establishing the Communist Youth.

In 1947, he was appointed to head various land and economic reforms (land reform) in Shanbei but was relieved gradually due to his high blood pressure.

When violence against landlords as part of the land reform movement surged in early 1948, Ren was one of the party leaders who criticized the movement. Ren announced a policy shift in January 1948, guaranteeing that targets of the movement would nonetheless be allowed to keep a share of property. This policy change contributed to a shift away from economic struggle and to political struggle. The Party instructed that fewer landlords should be targeted and work teams should not beat or torture their targets.

Also in 1948, Ren attended the Xibaipo Conference with Zhou, Liu, and Zhu De. Despite his illness, Ren assisted in the army command during the Liaoshen, Huaihai and Pingjin Campaigns.

In February 1949, he was appointed head of the Preparatory Committee for the Communist Youth League of China. He was made the honorary president of the Central Committee on 12 April during his recuperation at Jade Spring Hill. However, Ren's condition worsened and he had to be transferred to Moscow for further treatment. Following the outbreak of the Korean War, Ren returned to China on 28 May. Ren attended the first anniversary of the PRC held at Tiananmen on 1 October. Afterwards, Ren was active in studying the situation of the Korean War but suffered a stroke due to fatigue. Three days after his stroke and following unsuccessful treatment, he died in Beijing at 12:00 on October 27.

== Death and legacy ==
Upon his death, his memorial service was held in the Imperial Ancestral Temple on 30 October, with Mao, Liu, Zhou, Peng Zhen and Zhu De as the pall-bearers. Due to regulations against cremation, Ren was buried with a funeral service on 18 July 1951 in the Babaoshan Revolutionary Cemetery. Marshal Ye Jianying praised Ren as being the "party camel, who worked long and hard without rest, never seeking enjoyment, never bearing grudges against anyone. He was our model and best party member, an outstanding revolutionary."

The CCP Central Committee agreed to the publishing of the Selected Works of Ren Bishi in 1987 under People's Publishing House, after which the Collected Works of Ren Bishi followed in 1989.

Ren and his wife Chen Conying had nine children. One of their girls and four of their boys died. Others were given to peasants to care for during the war, and Ren and Chen's efforts to locate them afterwards were not successful. Their surviving son, Ren Yuanyuan, was born in Yan'an. He became an engineer, and also portrayed his father in The Song of the Chinese Revolution.

Party political offices
Preceded by Qu Qiubai	Secretary-General of the Politburo of the Chinese Communist Party; 19 June 1945 – 27 October 1950	Succeeded by Deng Xiaoping
Preceded by Huang Li	Head of the Organization Department of the Chinese Communist Party; January 1933 - March 1933	Succeeded by Kang Sheng
Preceded by Zhang Tailei	First Secretary of the Communist Youth League of China; May 1927 - June 1928	Succeeded by Guan Xiangying
