= Yang Zhihua =

- 杨之华
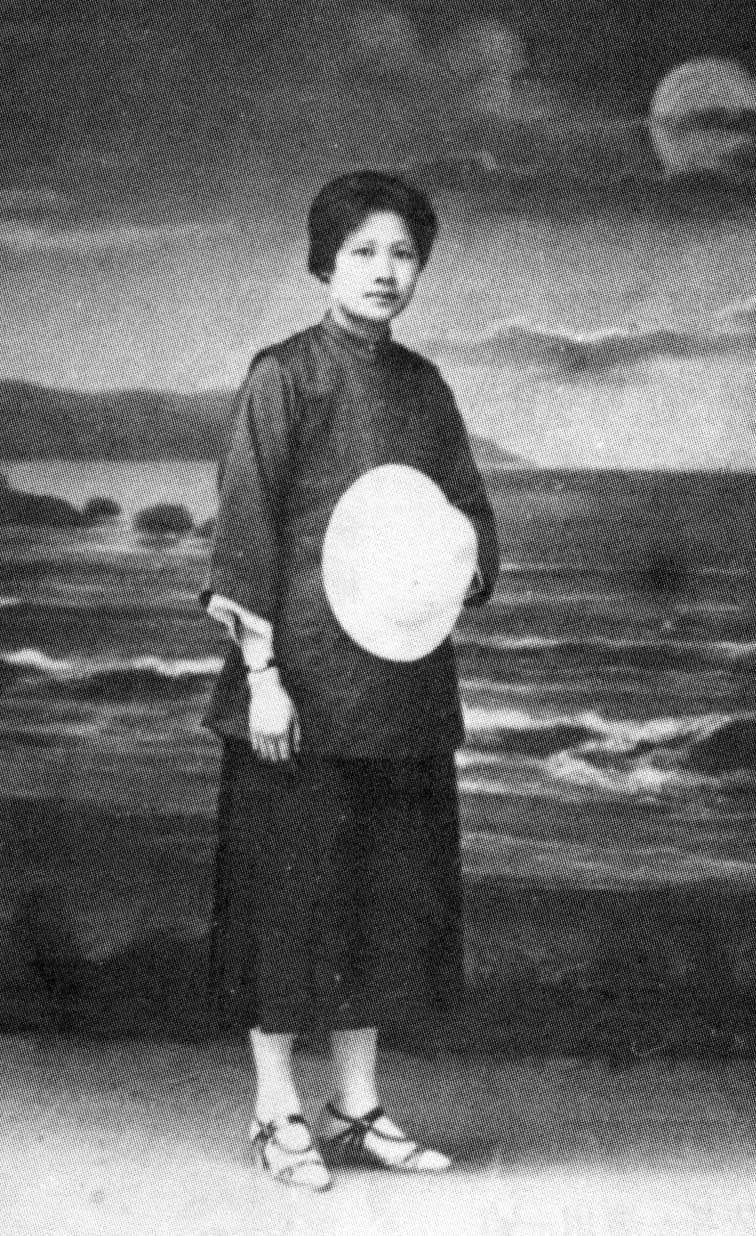
- Yang Zhihua in Hangzhou (before 1949)
- Born: 1900; Zhejiang Province, China
- Died: 1973 (aged 72–73); Beijing, China
- Occupations: Author; women's labor organizer/activist
- Spouse: ]: Qu Qiubai
- Children: Qu Duyi
- Writing career
- Subjects: love; marriage; divorce; labor; Chinese women's oppression
- Notable works: “Love and Socializing Between Men and Women"; “The Debate over ‘Love and Open Socializing between Men and Women'"; “My View on the Issue of Divorce”; “Women’s Careers”

Yang Zhihua (Chinese: 杨之华; 1900 -1973) was a feminist voice and a Chinese Communist Party (CCP) labor organizer who is known for her role as the Director of the Women’s Bureau. An avid writer, Yang explored topics of gendered and class inequality in her works.

Originally a schoolteacher, Yang attended Shanghai University where she became active in labor organizing on behalf of the CCP. Before and during her time at university, Yang wrote columns in the "Women’s Critic" section of The Republican Daily News (also known by its Chinese-language name, Min Kuo Ji Pao), a prominent Shanghai-based newspaper and the primary publication of the Kuomintang (KMT). Throughout her writings, Yang illustrated her support of systemic reform within Chinese culture and pushed for replacing traditional arranged marriages with marriages rooted in love and freedom.

With the onset of the Cultural Revolution, Yang came under suspicion of committing treasonous acts against the CCP, and was imprisoned until her death in 1973.

== Early life ==
Yang was born in 1900 to a silk merchant and landlord in Zhejiang. From 1917, she attended Hangzhou Girls' Normal School but was expelled two years later during the 1919 May Fourth student protests for participation in a progressive campus journal. With advice from her mentor Shen Dingyi, she went to Shanghai and began to write for the Weekly Review (also known as Xingqi pinglun), Shen's political journal discussing revolutionary thought. In 1920, Yang was hired as a teacher at the Yaqian Village School, a school for peasant farmers established by Shen. Later that year, she married Shen's son, Shen Jianlong, and welcomed their daughter, Qu Duyi the following year.

Yang became involved in the CCP when she joined the Socialist Youth League (later renamed the Communist Youth League of China), the youth branch of the CCP in 1922. She soon sought to expand her horizons, leaving to attend Shanghai University in 1923, where she combined Marxist theory with labor activism, becoming a women's labor organizer and facilitating multiple labor strikes. As a student, she met Qu Qiubai, a revolutionary leader and the chair of the sociology department at Shanghai University.

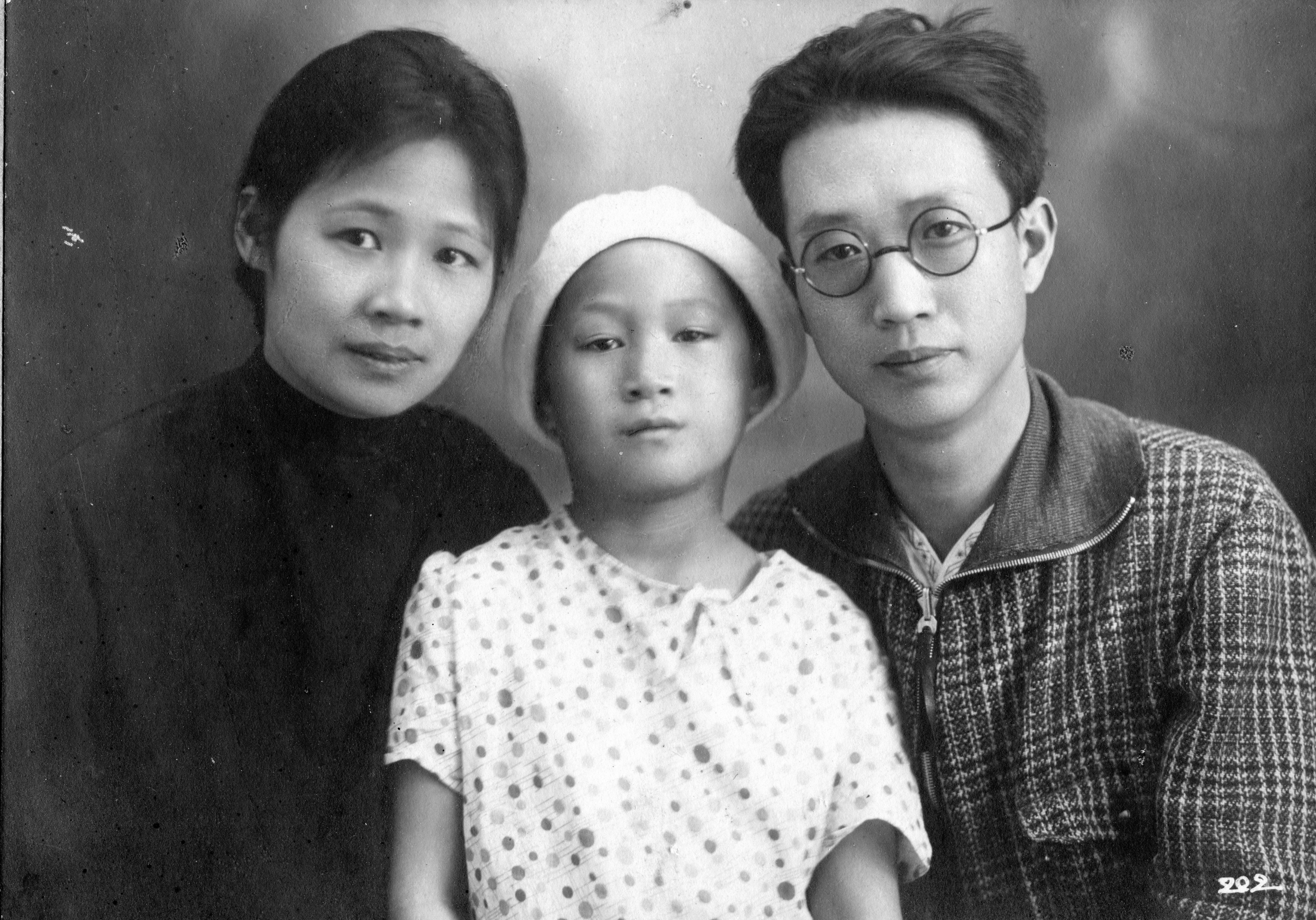
Yang Zhihua's family in Moscow in 1929. From left: Yang Zhihua, Qu Duyi and Qu Qiubai.

Yang was part of a group of women who, during changes in China's social fabric in the 1920s, started actively engaging with literature and writing. Throughout the decade, she wrote and published extensively on the inequities that plagued Chinese women. She pushed for China to modernize gender relations, advocating for women's emancipation and reconstructing social dynamics to be more equitable. In one instance, Yang publicly announced in The Republican Daily News in November 1924, that she was divorcing Shen and would be remarrying Qu, challenging conservative notions surrounding marriage that were pushed by more traditional perspectives. For Yang, the right to divorce was foundational to marriage and love. After the couple married, Qu adopted Yang's daughter from her previous marriage, Qu Duyi.

== Labor organizing ==
Following the 1924 alliance between the Chinese Communist Party and the KMT, there was a new upsurge in labor activism. At Shanghai University, the center of this push towards labor organizing, Yang became increasingly involved in CCP efforts to organize women workers in the packing and silk worker industries across widespread labor strikes.

Yang took a more central role in female labor organizing, beginning with the May Thirtieth Movement of 1925, a student and worker movement aimed at protesting British and Japanese imperialism as well as warlord rule. On June 1, 1925, Yang was elected to a leadership position in the Shanghai General Labor Union. That same month, Communist Party officials connected Yang with workers at the British American Tobacco Company (BAT). There, Yang began organizing female workers and recruiting them to take active roles in the May Thirtieth Movement. Yang was successful in recruiting women in BAT’s packing plant for the general strike in June 1925, bringing her public recognition. She also led these women into the Shanghai countryside in hopes of garnering public support for the movement, with little success in rural areas. Yang also helped facilitate labor unionization in the silk worker industry, though many of these workers did not participate in the June 1925 strike.

In October 1925, Yang became the communist Women’s Bureau's acting director, replacing Xiang Jingyu after she stepped down. Two years later, in May 1927, Yang was officially confirmed in this position and elected as part of the CCP’s Central Committee.

In 1928, Yang moved to the Soviet Union for study, returning in 1930 when she began working with the underground labor movement. In 1935, after her husband, Qu Qiubai was executed by the KMT, Yang moved to Moscow where she remained until 1942. When she returned, Yang was arrested by Mao Zemin and Chen Tanqiu, CCP leaders. She was imprisoned from 1942-1946 in Xinjiang, at which point Yang moved to Yan’an, a communist base.

In 1949, the Communist Party assumed power, and Yang became a leader among its labor movement. Among her most prominent positions was serving in the All-China Federation of Trade Unions, first on its Executive Committee (1948–66) and concurrently as director of its Women’s Department (1953–66). Yang was also a leading member of the All-China Women's Federation, serving as vice-chair (1957-1966) among other positions. In 1953, Yang was also appointed to the Committee for Implementing the Marriage Law where she directed campaigns aimed at enacting the 1950 New Marriage Law, which included raising the minimum age and abolishing arranged marriages. She also served on the Sino-Soviet Friendship Association from 1949 to 1954. In 1954 she was a member of the National People's Congress.

== Death and legacy ==
Yang’s work in labor activism ceased with the onset of the Cultural Revolution, at which point she received significant criticism for her relationship with Qu Qiubai, her deceased husband, who had written negatively about Marxism prior to his execution. Additionally, during the Cultural Revolution, release from a KMT jail in the 1930s and 1940s was widely viewed as evidence of traitorous activities. Thus, allegations arose that Yang had divulged CCP secrets during her previous imprisonment. She was imprisoned until three days before her death in 1973, when she died from cancer in Beijing Medical School Hospital.

A decade after her death, in 1983, the Shanghai Division of the Research Department of the CCP published Huiyi Yang Zhihua (translated as Recollections of Yang Zhihua), a collection of Yang’s writings and relatives’ and fellow female revolutionaries’ recollections of her. This collection was the first substantive publication by the CCP focusing on a prominent female CCP leader from the 1920s to the Cultural Revolution.

== Writings ==
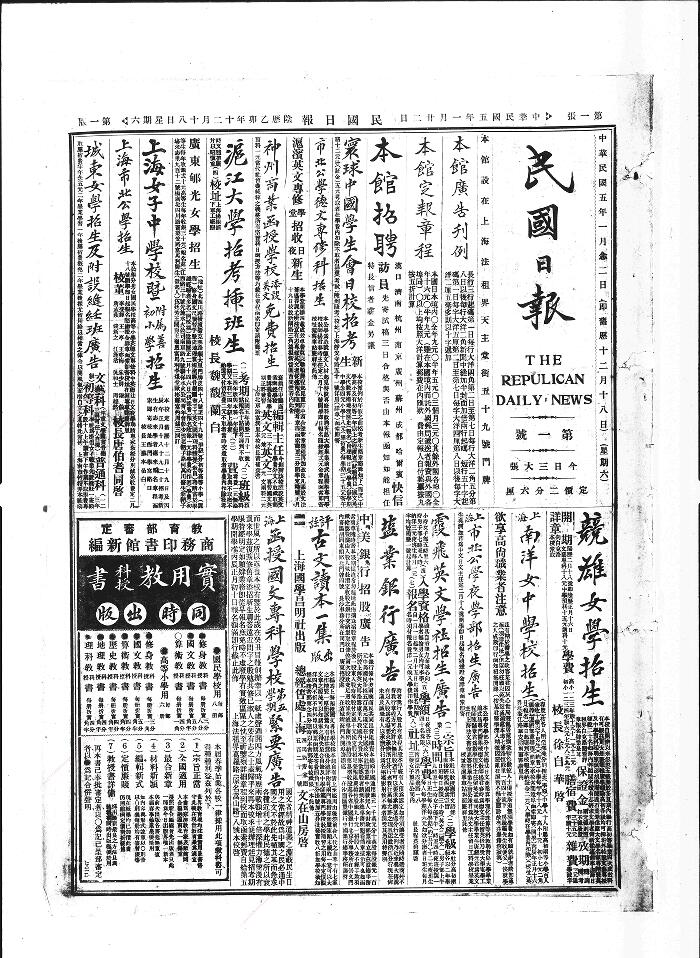
A 1916 issue of the Shanghai-based newspaper The Republican Daily News

=== Love, marriage, and divorce ===
==== “Love and Socializing Between Men and Women” (July 26, 1922) ====
Published in Women’s Critic of The Republican Daily News , Yang argued that people were confusing ordinary social interaction between men and women with romantic love, resulting in meaningless sex, shallow relationships, and rising divorce rates. She criticized traditional moral values that restricted such interactions and threatened China's social progress, instead placing an emphasis on mutual respect and self-autonomy.

She identified three main obstacles to this open socialization. First, she blamed “outside pressures,” as any friendly interaction between a man and woman was assumed to be romantic. These forced them into romantic and/or sexual relationships, but without the proper foundation, they soon separated. Second, some relationships were created through “animalistic socializing,” or seduction. This was due to the feeling of excitement when meeting someone of the opposite gender, which was then incorrectly expressed. Lastly, she mentioned “unrequited love,” in which misunderstandings about the true feelings of a person of the opposite gender could lead to suffering. Those who witnessed this would also be unwilling to socialize, afraid that they would end up in the same circumstance.

==== “The Debate over ‘Love and Open Socializing Between Men and Women’” (August 11, 1922) ====
Yang published a critique of an unnamed man’s newspaper response criticizing her original article in Women's Critic of The Republican Daily News. She identified this “gentleman” as a male admirer who attempted to coerce her into becoming his lover, even with her marriage to Qu and constant rejection of his intentions. This, she argued, contradicted his statement that conditional and requited love was solely dependent on knowledge and care for one another. She also pointed out that his comparison of love’s importance to deity worship demonstrated his support for unconditional, unrequited love. She lastly addressed his support of flirting as “the proletarian underdog’s expression of love,” which she strongly opposed. Instead, she believed that it was immoral and harmed both the proletariat and society as a whole. She concluded with urging for support for the New Culture Movement, to ensure that everyone was working to improve themselves. However, those who infringed on the human rights of others were preventing this from taking place, and thus they should lose their freedom of speech to ensure an improved society.

==== “My View on the Issue of Divorce” (July 25, 1922) ====
Yang justified her support for divorce in this article of Women’s Critic in The Republican Daily News. Regarding the question of who should be allowed to divorce, she insisted that marriages lacking true love or mutual consent should be permitted to. She also revealed her opinion that couples who lost this true love should be granted divorce, since forcing people to remain in painful unions was immoral and denied women independence. Throughout history, men had been able to find love outside the home despite their married status, but married women did not have the same option. Addressing the cause of divorce, she placed the blame on the various inherent differences between all people, which could eventually lead to animosity if not focused on and addressed.

=== Labor and emancipation ===
==== “Women’s Careers” (November 1922) ====
In this article of Women's Critic of The Republican Daily News, Yang argued that even with the rapid increase of women in the workforce, they seemed to be submissive to men. She explored how men historically dominated positions of power, ensuring that women would not have sole ability to rise within the workplace. Instead, they would have to appeal to men or compete with their fellow women, which then demonstrated how immature and undeserving they were. She noted that women of all classes remained socially subordinate to men, describing upper-class women as dependent "parasites,” noting that middle-class women benefited from new educational programs but still faced workplace "gender politics," and portrayed poor women as essentially enslaved and condemned to lifelong misery. Because of these shared conditions, she called for solidarity among all women as a route to greater independence and equality.

Critics observed that she was one of the few women published in the journal and that her call for unity between educated and uneducated women aligned with communist ideals, which she reinforced by arguing that office workers subordinate to male bosses were not fundamentally different from uneducated women in their lack of power. Her influence soon extended beyond writing, as she became a women's organizer in Shanghai, holding night schools for workers, organizing strikes, and later continuing her work within Communist Party women's groups until the Cultural Revolution.

==== "Chinese Women's Situation and the National Revolution" (1926) ====
Published in Zhongguo Funnü (or Chinese Women), Yang spoke out against traditional Confucian rules and customs that demeaned Chinese women, primarily focusing on the disparity in views of chastity between men and women. Describing the experiences of working-class women that she witnessed during the labor movement, she called for the support of women higher in society, whose needs were not ignored by the women's movement, and for working-class women to partake in organized strikes to be recognized. She argued that a "three-tier oppression" of working-class women existed with Confucianism, capitalism, and imperialism (through Western missionaries), and to combat this, the women's movement needed to ally with the national revolutionary movement.
