= Peng Shuzhi =

Chinese communist leader

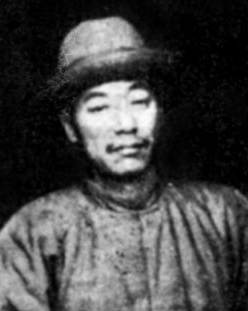
Peng Shuzhi, an early leader of the Chinese Communist Party.

Peng Shuzhi (also spelled Peng Shu-tse; Chinese: 彭述之; pinyin: Péng Shùzhī'; 1895–1983) was an early leader of the Chinese Communist Party who was expelled from the party for being a Trotskyist. After the Communist victory in China, he lived in exile in Vietnam, France and the United States. His memoir was published in France by his daughter Cheng Yingxiang and son-in-law Claude Cadart.

== Biography ==
Peng was born in Longhui County, Baoqing Prefecture, Hunan province in 1895. He joined the Chinese Socialist Youth League in 1920, and later was sent to study in Moscow. After returning to China in September 1924, he became a member of the Central Committee of the Chinese Communist Party, directed the propaganda work of the Party and edited its central journal during the revolution of 1925–1927 (see First United Front). During this time, he began living with Chen Bilan (陳碧蘭), whom he later married.

Peng's extramarital relationship with Xiang Jingyu exacerbated disagreements between Party leadership. As the Party had grown rapidly following the May Thirtieth Movement, leadership was divided over the organization of the Party. Peng and Chen Duxiu favored centralized authority, while Qu Qiubai, Cai Hesen, and Zhang Guotao supported increased autonomy for local Party organizations.

During the Party's 5th National Congress in late April and early May 1927, Peng and Chen were criticized by Qu and Cai criticized for what Qu and Cai described as rightist opportunism, contending that Chen and Peng's approach impeded the progress of worker's movements and leadership of the proletariat. Qu distributed a 70,000 word pamphlet titled Controversial Issues in the Chinese Revolution, asserting that "our party is sick, and the name of the illness is Peng Shuzhi-ism." Peng ceased to be a member of the Politburo after the Congress.

Following a meeting in August 1927, the Party established its Northern Bureau, which was led by Peng, Cai, and Wang Hebo.

Peng was expelled from the party in November 1929, together with Chen Duxiu, for supporting Trotskyism.

In 1949, on the eve of Communist victory in China, Peng fled Shanghai with his family to British Hong Kong and then to Saigon, State of Vietnam in January 1950. After fellow Trotskyist Liu Jialiang (刘家良) was arrested and killed by Vietnamese agents, in June 1951 Peng fled again to Paris, then the headquarters of the Trotskyist Fourth International. In Paris, his daughter Cheng Yingxiang (程映湘) married the French sinologist Claude Cadart. They later organized, translated and published Peng's memoirs entitled L’envol du communisme en Chine. Peng and his wife moved to the United States in 1972. He died in Los Angeles on the 28th of November, 1983, at 88 years old.

== Works ==
- Peng Shu-tse, Leslie Evans: The Chinese Communist Party in Power. Pathfinder Press, 1980.
- Li Fu-jen [Frank Glass], Peng Shu-tse: Revolutionaries in Mao’s Prisons: Case of the Chinese Trotskyists. 1974.

== Literature ==
- Claude Cadart, Cheng Yingxiang: L’envol du communisme en Chine: Mémoires de Peng Shuzhi. Paris, Gallimard, 1983.
- Joseph T. Miller: Peng Shuzhi and the Chinese Revolution: Notes Toward a Political Biography. In: Historical Materialism 12/2000; 8(1), p. 265-266.
- Chén Bìlán: Wǒ de huíyì – yī gè Zhōngguó gémìngzhě de huígù 《我的回憶—一個中國革命者的回顧》. Hong Kong, Shíyuè shūwū 十月書屋 1994.
- Chén Bìlán: Zǎoqī Zhōng-Gòng yǔ Tuōpài – wǒde gémìng shēngyá huìyì 《早期中共與托派—我的革命生涯會議》. Hong Kong, Tiāndì túshū yǒuxiàn gōngsī 天地圖書有限公司 2010.

== See also ==
- Wang Fanxi
