= Qu Qiubai =

Chinese litterateur (1899–1935)

- 瞿秋白
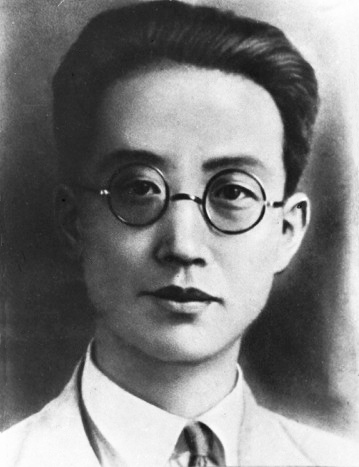

Member of the 6th Politburo of the Chinese Communist Party
- In office 1928–1935

Member of the 5th Politburo of the Chinese Communist Party
- In office 1927–1928

7th Head of the Publicity Department of the Chinese Communist Party
- In office August 1927 – October 1927
- Preceded by: Cai Hesen
- Succeeded by: Luo Qiyuan

5th Head of the Publicity Department of the Chinese Communist Party
- In office April 1927 – April 1927
- Preceded by: Peng Shuzhi
- Succeeded by: Cai Hesen

Personal details
- Born: 29 January 1899 Changzhou, Jiangsu, China
- Died: 18 June 1935 (aged 36) Changting County, Fujian, China
- Cause of death: Executed
- Party: Chinese Communist Party
- Spouse(s): Wang Jianhong; Yang Zhihua
- Children: 1
- Education: Russian Language Institute; Peking University (audit)
- Occupation: Politician, writer, literary critic

Chinese name
- Chinese: 瞿秋白
Transcriptions
Standard Mandarin
- Hanyu Pinyin: Qú Qiūbái
- Bopomofo: ㄑㄩˊ ㄑㄧㄡ ㄅㄞˊ
- Wade–Giles: Ch'ü^{2} Ch'iu^{1}-pai^{2}
- IPA: [tɕʰy̌ tɕʰjóʊ.pǎɪ]
Yue: Cantonese
- Yale Romanization: Kèuih Chāu-baahk
- Jyutping: Keoi4 Cau1-baak6
- IPA: [kʰɵɥ˩ tsʰɐw˥.pak̚˨]

Russian name
- Russian: Страхов
- Romanization: Strakhov

Qu Qiubai (Chinese: 瞿秋白; 29 January 1899 – 18 June 1935) was a Chinese writer, poet, translator, and political activist. In the late 1920s and early 1930s he was the de facto leader of the Chinese Communist Party. In 1935, he was arrested and executed by the Republic of China Government led by the Kuomintang in Changting, Fujian.

== Early life ==
Qu was born in Changzhou, Jiangsu. His family lived in Tianxiang Lou (天香楼; 'Tianxiang Pavilion') located on Qingguo Lane (青果巷). Qu's father, Qu Shiwei (瞿世玮), was born in a family that was once powerful. He was good at painting and fencing and acquired much medical knowledge, but had no interest in politics and business. Qu's mother, Jin Xuan (金璇), the daughter of an elite government official, was skilled in poetry. Qu had five brothers and one sister, he being the eldest. When Qu was young, his family lived in his uncle's house and was supported financially by relatives. Though Qu's father took a job as a teacher, he was not able to support his family due to his addiction to opium. In 1915, Qu's mother, overcome by her life's mounting difficulties and debts, committed suicide.

In 1916, Qu went to Hankou (today Wuhan) and entered Wuchang Foreign Language School to learn English with the support of his cousin. In the spring of 1917, Qu went to Beijing to apply for a job, but did not pass the general civil service examination. Not having enough money to pay for a regular university tuition, Qu enrolled in the newly established Russian Language Institute (俄文专修馆) under the Chinese Ministry of Foreign Affairs, since it did not require payment of fee. The institute also offered a stipend and promised him a job upon graduation.

== Communist Party involvement ==
Qu worked hard in the language institute, learning both French and Russian and spending his spare time studying Buddhist philosophy and classical Chinese. Both were his interests cultivated since childhood, as well as the works of Bertrand Russell whose discussion of physics and perception was to Qu similar to the teachings of Buddhism.

His earliest contacts with revolutionary circles came when he participated in discussions of Marxist analysis hosted by Li Dazhao at Beijing University, who was the campus' head librarian. The future communist leader and CCP chairman Mao Zedong was also present at these meetings. Qu later took a job as a journalist for a Beiping newspaper Morning News (晨报) and was sent to Moscow as a correspondent, even though this would jeopardise a career in the civil service which his earlier training had prepared him for. Qu was one of the first Chinese to report from Moscow about life in Russia during and after the Bolshevik Revolution, where he observed the harshness of living conditions. While in Russia, he also visited Leo Tolstoy's home at Yasnaya Polyana with Tolstoy's granddaughter Sofya, saw Lenin addressing a group of delegates, heard Feodor Chaliapin sing Alexander Pushkin's poems set to music, and witnessed Pyotr Kropotkin's funeral.

In January 1923, Qu accepted the invitation from Chen Duxiu, leader of the Chinese Communist Party at that time, to come back from Russia to join in his cause. After returning, Qu was responsible for the propaganda work of Chinese Communist Party. In 1927 after the fall of Chen Duxiu, he became acting Chairman of the CCP Politburo and the de facto leader of the party. The CCP followed an insurrectionary policy and organised actions such as the Autumn Harvest Uprising or the Guangzhou Uprising of December 11, 1927. All of these were crushed which caused the CCP to lose all links with the urban proletariat and forced the CCP to retreat to rural enclaves.

In April 1928, Qu went to Moscow once again and worked as a delegate of the Chinese Communist Party for two years. During the Sixth Party Congress of the CCP held there from June 18 to July 11, his tactics were criticized as a "putchist left deviation". In 1930, after being dismissed as Chinese Communist Party representative in Russia, Qu returned to China only to be also dismissed from the central leadership. This was all due to an intense argument over how the revolution should be carried out. Following his dismissal, Qu worked both as a writer and a translator in Shanghai, fought literary battles along with Mao Dun and Lu Xun and forged a profound friendship with leaders of the left-wing cultural movement.

== Execution ==
In 1934, the situation became increasingly dangerous and Qu could not stay in Shanghai any longer, so he went to the Communists' Central Revolutionary Base Area in Ruijin, Jiangxi province. When the Red Army began the famous Long March, Qu stayed in the south to lead the bush fighting. Qu continued publishing Red China, the official newspaper of the Chinese Soviet Republic, until January 1935.

Arrested in Changting, Fujian in 1934, Qu was sentenced to death by Kuomintang a year later. During his arrest, Qu was tortured by the KMT government, who adopted various means to induce him to capitulate, but he was persistent in his beliefs and refused.

In 1935, Qu wrote the essay Superfluous Words, in which he described his development as a revolutionary and candidly addressed his vulnerabilities and uncertainties.

On 18 June 1935, Qu walked calmly toward the execution place, Zhongshan Park in Changting, singing "The Internationale", the "Red Army Song", and shouting "Down with the Kuomintang", "Long live the Chinese Communist Party", "Long live the victory of the Chinese revolution", "Long live communism" and other slogans. After reaching Luohanling, a small hill in Zhongshan Park, Qu chose a place to sit down on the grass, smiled, and nodded to the executioner, saying "very good here!" Qu was only 36 when he was shot dead.

== Influence and legacy ==
Ding Ling's 1930 novel Wei Hu was based on Qu's relationship with Ding's close friend Wang Jianhong. In 1932, Qu was the Communist Party representative at Ding's admission into the Party. Ding's 1942 essay Commemorating Xiao Hong in Wind and Rain, grieves for the premature death of Xiao Hong, Qu's execution, and the political suspicion against her friends Feng Xuefeng and Hu Feng. In Ding's 1980 essay Comrade Qu Qiubai as I Knew Him, Ding praised his commitment to communism and courage in revealing his internal struggles. Ding wrote, "[R]evolutionaries are not deities. Imperfections and mistakes are inevitable. However, if they confront themselves, engaging in introspection, aren't they more vulnerable than the hypocrites who mislead the masses?"

During the Cultural Revolution, Qu was described as a traitor for controversies over his 1935 essay Superfluous Words.

On 19 October 1980, the Communist Party's Central Committee released The Investigation Report on Comrade Qu Qiubai's Arrest and Martyrdom. The reported stated that Superfluous Words was not evidence of any betrayal by Qu. It reinstated his reputation and praised Qu for significant contributions to the Chinese Revolution.

A Qu Qiubai museum stands in his native town of Changzhou. Tsi-an Hsia (夏济安; 夏濟安) describes Qu in The Gate of Darkness: Studies on the Leftist Literary Movement in China (published 1968) as "the tenderhearted Communist". Qu and a Russian counterpart, V.S. Kolokolov, were responsible for the early development of the Sin Wenz system of Mandarin romanization. Qu also translated The Internationale into Chinese, with his version recognised as the official one and used as the anthem of the Chinese Communist Party.

Qu was one of the major Chinese intellectuals to emerge from the May 4th Movement, and one of early Communist Party members who established the spirit of the revolutionary movement in China. He is also widely remembered as an emotive poet.

Party political offices
Previous: Peng Shuzhi	5th Head of the Publicity Department of the Chinese Communist Party; 1927-1927	Next: Cai Hesen
Previous: Cai Hesen	7th Head of the Publicity Department of the Chinese Communist Party; 1927-1927	Next: Luo Qiyuan
