= Zhang Xi (politician) =

Chinese politician

- 张玺

Party Secretary of Henan
- In office October 1949 – November 1952
- Succeeded by: Pan Fusheng

Personal details
- Born: 1 February 1912 Pingxiang, Hebei, China
- Died: 8 January 1959 (aged 46) Beijing
- Party: Chinese Communist Party

Zhang Xi (Chinese: 张玺; 1 February 1912 – 8 January 1959) was a Chinese Communist revolutionary and politician. He was the first Chinese Communist Party Committee Secretary of Henan province of the People's Republic of China, and one of the founding members of the State Planning Commission. He died of nasopharynx cancer in 1959, at the age of 46. During the Cultural Revolution, he was posthumously denounced as a traitor, and his ashes were exhumed and discarded.

== Republic of China ==
Zhang Xi was born on 1 February 1912 in Dongtian Village, Pingxiang County, Hebei province. His original name was Wang Changzhen (Chinese: 王常珍). In 1931, while a student at the Provincial No. 4 Normal School in Xingtai, he joined the Communist Youth League of China, and later became its leader. After the 1931 Mukden Incident, which led to the Japanese occupation of Manchuria, he organized student protests in Xingtai against the Japanese aggression.

In the autumn of 1932, Zhang was arrested in Xingtai by the Kuomintang (KMT) government, and imprisoned at the Caolanzi Prison in Beiping (now Beijing) for more than four years. Also held in the prison were other important Communist leaders including Bo Yibo, An Ziwen, and Liu Lantao. In 1934, Zhang joined the Chinese Communist Party (CCP) while in prison. In 1935, the KMT government signed the He–Umezu Agreement with Japan, agreeing to cease all KMT activities in Hebei, including Beiping, and released the Communist prisoners in Beiping the following year.

After his release from prison, Zhang Xi reconnected with the CCP leadership and helped establish and lead the Hebei–Shandong–Henan (Ji–Lu–Yu) revolutionary base area. He participated in the Second Sino-Japanese War and the subsequent Chinese Civil War against the KMT government. He served as Deputy Party Secretary and later Party Secretary of the region, as well as Political Commissar of the military region.

== People's Republic of China ==
After the Communist forces took control of the entire Henan province from the KMT government in January 1949, Zhang Xi was appointed the CCP Committee Secretary of the province in May, before the establishment of the People's Republic of China in October. At 37, he was the youngest provincial party chief, along with Su Zhenhua, the party chief of Guizhou. Zhang oversaw the land reform in Henan, and worked to help its economy recover from more than a decade of warfare.

Zhang Xi's work in Henan was praised by the central government, and in 1952 he was transferred to Beijing to become the Deputy Director of the newly established State Planning Commission. In September 1956, he was elected as an alternate member of the 8th Central Committee of the Chinese Communist Party.

== Death ==
In April 1956, Zhang was diagnosed with nasopharynx cancer. He was sent to Moscow, where he was treated at the Kremlin Hospital for three months. After returning to China, it was discovered that his cancer had metastasized, and he underwent another major operation. He died on 8 January 1959, at the age of 46.

== Cultural Revolution ==
After the radical Cultural Revolution erupted in 1966, many Communist revolutionaries who had spent time in Kuomintang prisons, including Zhang's former prison mates Bo Yibo and An Ziwen, were denounced as traitors (known as the "61 Renegades") and persecuted. Zhang was posthumously labelled a traitor, and his ashes were exhumed and discarded. His name was cleared after the Cultural Revolution ended in 1976.

== See also ==
- 61 Renegades

Political offices
| New title | Party Secretary of Henan; 1949–1952 | Succeeded by Pan Fusheng |
