= Yin Jian (Communist leader) =

Early member of the Chinese Communist Party (1904–1937)

Yin Jian (Chinese: 殷鉴; 1904–1937), also known as Dongshan (Chinese: 东山), alias Huang Jianchun (Chinese: 黄建纯), was an early member of the Chinese Communist Party and a member of the 28 Bolsheviks. He served shortly as first secretary of the Northern Bureau during the Civil War before being arrested and imprisoned by KMT authorities in 1931. Yin was released by publicly recanting his CCP allegiance as part of the 61 renegades in 1936. He died three months after his release.

== Biography ==
He was born in Huilongshan Town, Tuanfeng County, Hubei Province. In 1926, he went to the Soviet Union to study at Moscow Sun Yat-sen University studying under Pavel Mif's direction. In January 1931, he was made a Party Committee member for Shanghai and later for Beiping. He soon replaced Kong Xiangzhen, who had fallen ill, as first secretary of the Shunzhi Pronvincial Committee (顺直省 - later changed to Hebei).

In June 1931, he was arrested alongside Bo Yibo, An Ziwen, Hu Xikui, and other CPC members including Liu Lantao. Yin was imprisoned and sentenced to death by KMT authorities, which was later commuted to 14 years in prison. After his arrest, Ma Huizhi (马辉之) took over his functions as leader of the Northern Bureau, before also being arrested in December 1931.

These cadres were eventually transferred to Caolanzi Prison (草岚子监狱), where a prison Party branch was established with Yin Jian as its secretary. The Prisoners also attempted to use Caolanzi as a Party School. Having learnt Russian while in Moscow, Yin Jian contributed to the prisoners' illicit efforts to translate a number of Marxist and Leninist texts drawn from Marx, Engels, Lenin, Stalin, and Lewis Henry Morgan from Russian to Chinese. Yin Jian fell ill during his imprisonment, with other prisoners like Yang Xianzhen caring for him. In 1936, through the efforts of Liu Shaoqi, he was among the 57 communists who were released from Caolanzi in exchange for recanting their CCP allegiance. He died of illness the next year, just three months after his release.
