= Qualification Review Committee of the 8th National Congress of the Chinese Communist Party =

The Qualification Review Committee of the 8th National Congress of the Chinese Communist Party was elected by congress delegates in a preparatory meeting before the convening of the congress.

== Members ==
Members of the Qualification Review Committee of the 8th National Congress
Rank	Name	Hanzi	Birth	Death	Ethnicity	Gender	Ref.
1	Dong Biwu	董必武	1886	1975	Han	Male	
2	Tan Zhenlin	谭震林	1902	1983	Han	Male	
3	Liu Lantao	刘澜涛	1910	1997	Han	Male	
4	Wang Enmao	王恩茂	1913	2001	Han	Male	
5	Deng Yingchao	邓颖超	1904	1992	Han	Female	
6	An Ziwen	安子文	1909	1980	Han	Male	
7	Li Jingquan	李井泉	1909	1989	Han	Male	
8	Li Xuefeng	李雪峰	1907	2003	Han	Male	
9	Song Renqiong	宋任穷	1909	2005	Han	Male	
10	Wu Zhipu	吴芝圃	1906	1967	Han	Male	
11	Lin Feng	林枫	1906	1977	Han	Male	
12	Lin Tie	林铁	1904	1989	Han	Male	
13	Ouyang Qin	欧阳钦	1900	1978	Han	Male	
14	Ke Qingshi	柯庆施	1902	1965	Han	Male	
15	Xu Xiangqian	徐向前	1901	1990	Han	Male	
16	Tao Zhu	陶铸	1908	1969	Han	Male	
17	Ma Mingfang	马明方	1905	1974	Han	Male	
18	Ulanhu	乌兰夫	1906	1988	Mongolian	Male	
19	Zhang Desheng	张德生	1909	1965	Han	Male	
20	Zhang Dingcheng	张鼎丞	1898	1981	Han	Male	
21	Huang Kecheng	黄克诚	1902	1986	Han	Male	
22	Huang Oudong	黄欧东	1905	1993	Han	Male	
23	He Long	贺龙	1896	1969	Han	Male	
24	Shu Tong	舒同	1905	1998	Han	Male	
25	Yang Shangkun	杨尚昆	1907	1998	Han	Male	
26	Cai Chang	蔡畅	1900	1990	Han	Female	
27	Xie Fuzhi	谢富治	1909	1972	Han	Male	
28	Tan Zheng	谭政	1906	1988	Han	Male	
29	Gong Zirong	龚子荣	1914	1995	Han	Male	

== See also ==
- 8th National Congress of the Chinese Communist Party
- Organization of the Chinese Communist Party
