= Jin Weiying =

Chinese political figure

- 金维映
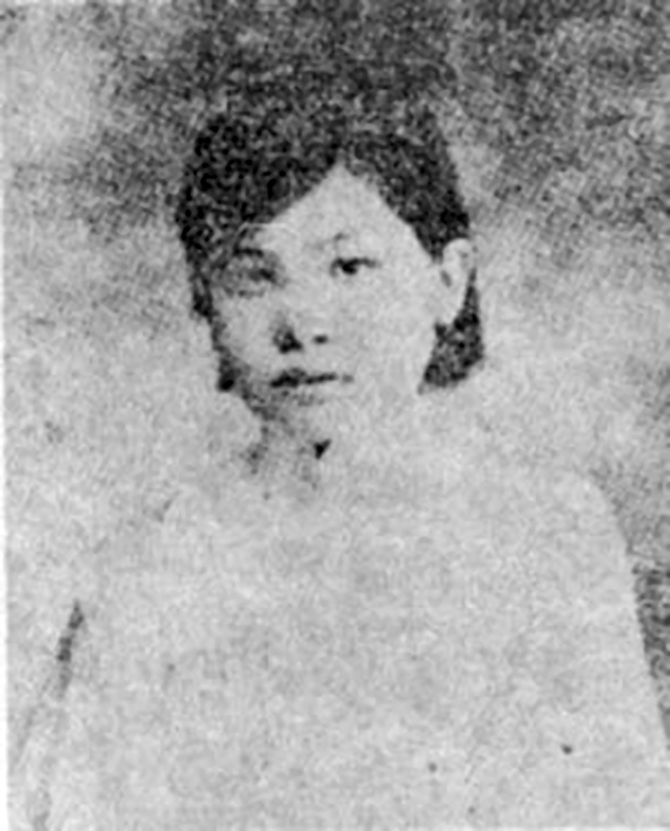
- Born: 16 August 1904; Gaotingang, Dinghai District, Zhejiang, Qing China
- Died: c. 1940/1941; Soviet Union (USSR)
- Education: Ningpo Women's Normal School
- Occupations: teacher, revolutionary, trade unionist and participant in the Long March
- Spouse(s): Deng Xiaoping (m. 1932, div. bef. 1934); Li Weihan
- Children: Li Tieying

Jin Weiying (金维映, 16 August 1904 – c. 1940/1941), sometimes known as Ah Jin, was a Chinese teacher, revolutionary, trade unionist, member of the Chinese Communist Party (CCP) and participant in the Long March.

== Early life ==
Jin was born into a progressive gentry family on 16 August 1904 in Gaotingang, Dinghai District, Qing China. She moved with her family to the Zhoushan Islands as a child.

Jin was educated at the Dinghai Girls' Primary School, then studied at the Ningpo Women's Normal School under the principal Shen Yi to become a teacher. She visited Shanghai University to visit friends, and was introduced to Qu Qiubai, Xiang Ying and Yang Zhihua and begun to study Marxism.

== Revolutionary activity ==
Jin joined the Chinese Communist Party (CCP) in 1926, and was appointed as a leader of a CCP cell in Dinghai. During this time she was nicknamed "the Girl General of Dinghai" due to her agitating among workers to form the Dinghai County Federation of Trade Unions. On 12 April 1927, Jin was arrested and imprisoned during the purges of the Shanghai massacre, but was released on bail.

After moving to Shanghai, Jin worked in a primary school and continued her involvement in union organising, becoming secretary of the Silk Workers Party Group and supporting the establishment of the Daishan Salt Association. She was transferred to the Huaxi District as the Minister of Women in 1929. She also established a night school in 1930.

In 1934, Jin was elected as a delegate to the Soviet Republic of China's Central Executive Committee. Jin was one of the thirty women who went with the First Front Red Army on the Long March (1934–1936) as Captain of the Women's Brigade. She also worked as a political instructor with the convalescent unit and organised food supplies.

During the Second Sino-Japanese War, Jin became deputy director of the Northern Shaanxi Public School Life Steering Committee.

== Personal life ==
Jin met party member Deng Xiaoping in 1931 in the Central Soviet Area of Shanghai. They married in Ruijin during the summer 1932, but he fell into political disfavour, and they had divorced before 1934. Deng later became the paramount leader of the People's Republic of China from 1978 to 1989.

Soon after her divorce, Jin married the Head of the Organization Department of the Chinese Communist Party, Li Weihan. They had a child, Li Tieying, in 1936. He Zizhen, Liu Ying and Li Jianzhen helped her with the birth.

== Death and legacy ==
By the spring of 1938, Jin became ill and was coughing up blood, and travelled to Kuchino, near Moscow in the Soviet Union for medical treatment and to study. Jin died in 1940 or 1941. It is believed that her death occurred during German air raids on the Soviet Union during World War II.

In 1991, the Daishan County People's Government renovated Jin's former residence. The "Jin Weiying Memorial Hall" is named in her honour. In 1994 the state posthumously recognized her as a revolutionary martyr.
