= 海山 =

海山, meaning "sea (and) mountain", may refer to:

- Hai San Secret Society, 19th-century organisation based in Penang
- One of the Chinese names of Külüg Khan, third Emperor of China's Yuan Dynasty
- Haishan metro station, Taipei Rapid Transit System, Taiwan
- Haishan Subdistrict, a subdistrict of Yantian District, Shenzhen, China
- Haishan, a subdivision of Jiefang Subdistrict, Zhoushan, China
- Miyama, Mie, former town in Japan
- Montane Mansion (海山樓), in Hong Kong
