= Dinghai, Zhoushan =

Dinghai 定海区 Tinghai
- District
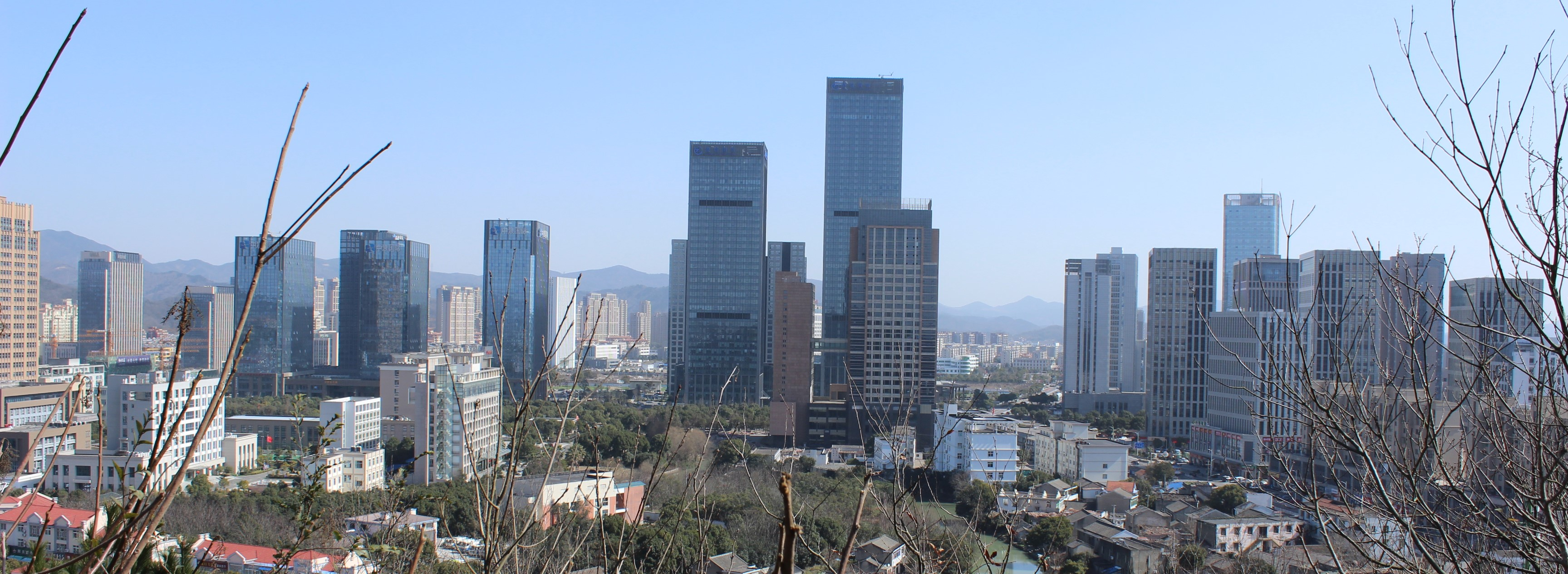
- Zhoushan New Town

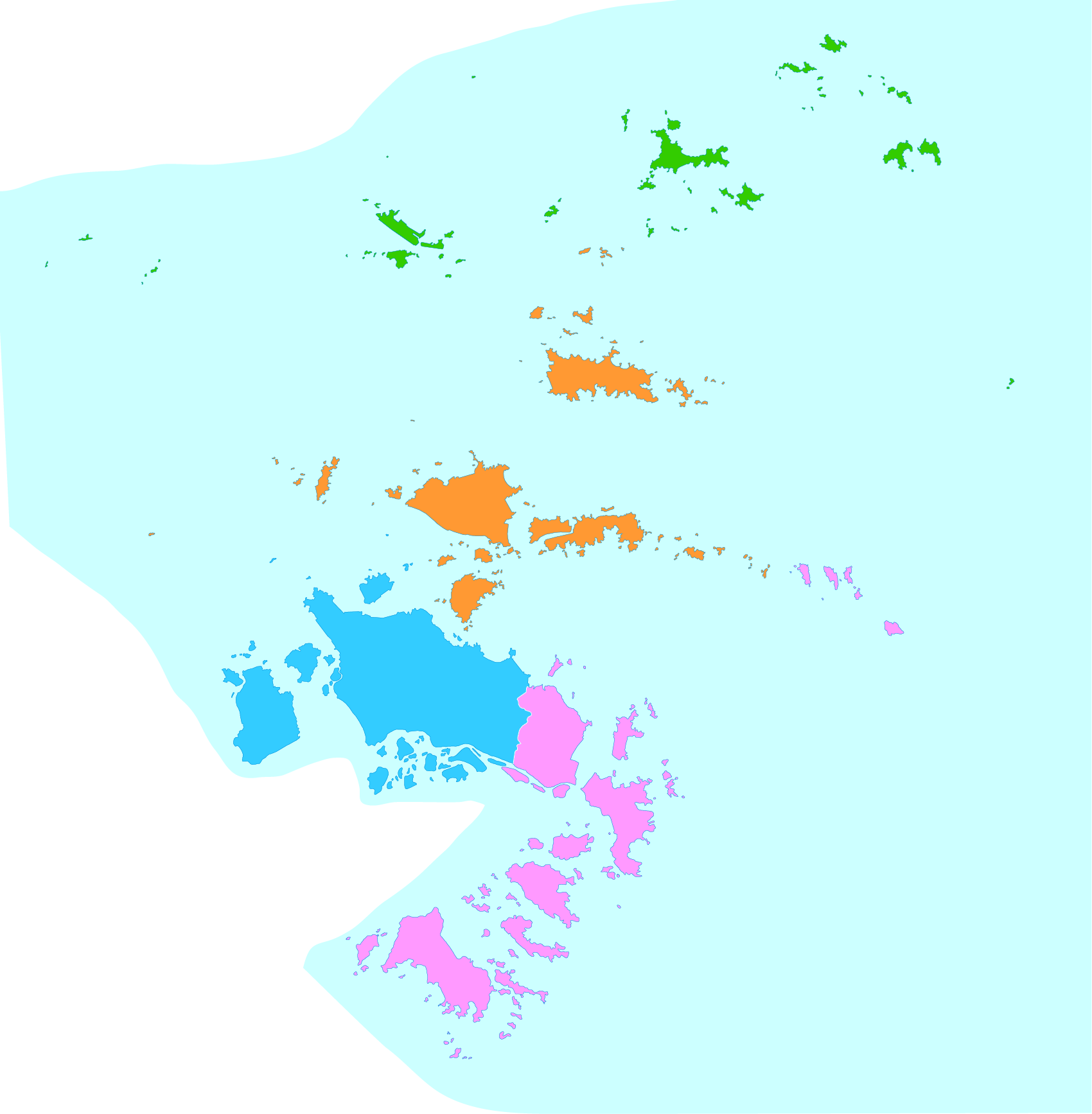
- Dinghai District is in blue here on the map.

- Location in Zhejiang
- Coordinates (Dinghai District government): 30°01′11″N 122°06′24″E
- Country: People's Republic of China
- Province: Zhejiang
- Prefecture-level city: Zhoushan
- Seat: Changguo Subdistrict

Area
  - Total: 1,444.0 km^{2} (557.5 sq mi)
  - Land: 568.8 km^{2} (219.6 sq mi)
  - Water: 875.2 km^{2} (337.9 sq mi)

Population (2019)
  - Total: 399,382
  - Density: 702.1/km^{2} (1,819/sq mi)
- Time zone: UTC+8 (China Standard)
- Postal code: 316000
- Website: dinghai.gov.cn

Dinghai
- Chinese: 定海
- Postal: Tinghai
Transcriptions
Standard Mandarin
- Hanyu Pinyin: Dìnghǎi
- Wade–Giles: Ting^{4}-hai^{3}

Dinghai (simplified Chinese: 定海区; traditional Chinese: 定海區; pinyin: Dìnghǎi Qū) is a district of Zhoushan City made of 128 islands in Zhejiang province, China. The total area is 1,444 square kilometres. The land area is 568.8 square kilometres, the sea area is 875.2 square kilometres, and the coastline is more than 400 kilometres. It is based on the larger northwestern half of Zhoushan Island, where it borders Putuo in the east. The district boundary meets that of Daishan County out at sea to the north of the island. Its southwestern boundary intersects the border of Ningbo, also entirely at sea.

The district, which was formed in January 1987 when it was upgraded from county status, has a population of 399,382 as of 2019.

== History ==
According to the Dinghai People's Government, the area of Dinghai has been inhabited by humans for over 5,000 years.

During the Spring and Autumn period, the area was known as Yongdong (甬东; 甬東), and belonged to the Yue kingdom.

The area was incorporated as Wenshan County (翁山县; 翁山縣) in 738 CE. In 771 CE, the county was abolished and placed under Mao County (鄮县; 鄮縣).

In 1073, the area was organized as Changguo County (昌国县; 昌國縣), and was placed under the jurisdiction of Ningpo city's Ming Prefecture. It was renamed Dinghai County (定海县; 定海縣) in 1688.

During the First Opium War, Dinghai was taken by British forces on July 6, 1840. Dinghai was handed back by Charles Elliot, but was subsequently re-captured by Henry Pottinger, on October 1, 1841.

Dinghai was taken by the Chinese Communists on 17 May 1950.

In October 1958, Zhoushan's prefecture-level status was revoked, and the area became part of Zhoushan County. In April 1962, Zhoushan was restored to prefecture-level status, and Dinghai County was re-established.

In January 1987, Dinghai County became Dinghai District (定海区).

== Geography ==
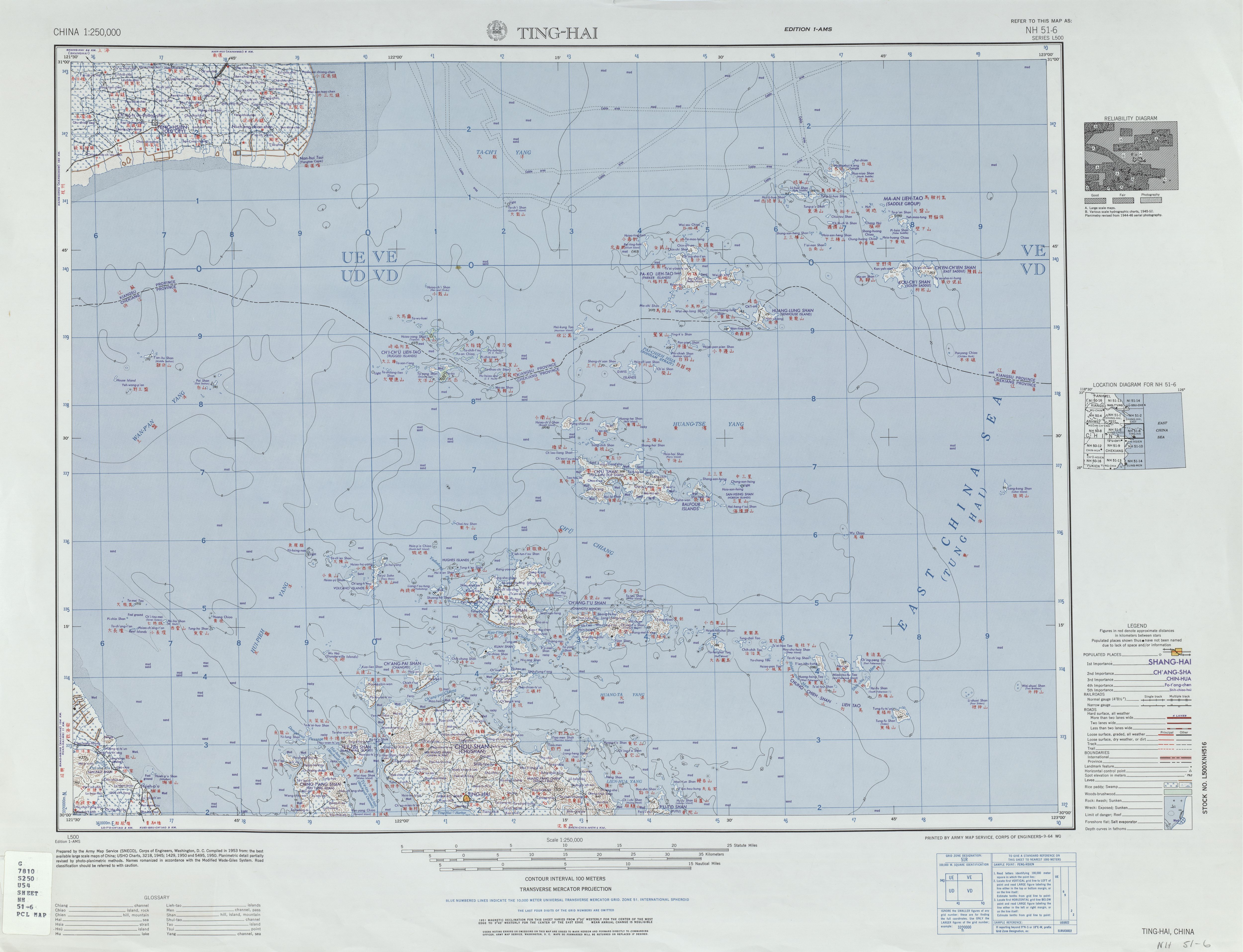
Dinghai (labeled TING-HAI 定海) (1953)

Dinghai District has a total area of 1,444.0 square kilometres, of which, 568.8 square kilometres is land, and the remaining 875.2 square kilometres is sea. Located in northeast Zhejiang Province, southeast Shanghai, Hangzhou Bay, the outer edge of the East China Sea.

The district spans 128 islands, including Zhoushan Island, Jintang Island, Damao Island (大猫岛), Cezi Island, Changbai Island, and Aoshan Island. Other islands include Changzhi Island (长峙岛) and Panzhi Island (盘峙岛). Many of the islands have hilly terrain, and the highest point in the district is Huangyanjian Mountain (黄杨尖山), which reaches 503.6 meters in altitude.

The area is rich in marine life, with 80 species of fish, and over 150 species of shellfish. The endangered black-faced spoonbill, the yellow-billed egret, the horned grebe, and other species of birds are also native to the island.

=== Climate ===
The region enjoys the subtropical maritime monsoon climate of northern type, featuring warm winters, cool summers, high humidity, and plenty of sunshine.

The district experiences an average temperature of 16.8 °C. The district's coldest month is January, which averages 6.2 °C in temperature, and the district's warmest month is August, which averages 27.4 °C in temperature. The coldest temperature recorded in the district was −4.2 °C, which occurred on December 28, 1991. The warmest temperature recorded in the district was 40.2 °C, which occurred on July 21, 2007.

Average annual rainfall in Dinghai is 1410.8 millimetres, and the district experiences an average of 149 rainy days per year.

The area experiences typhoons, heavy rains, floods, and droughts. The district was hit by a blizzard on March 12, 2005, which bought the most snowfall to the area since 1978.

== Administrative divisions ==
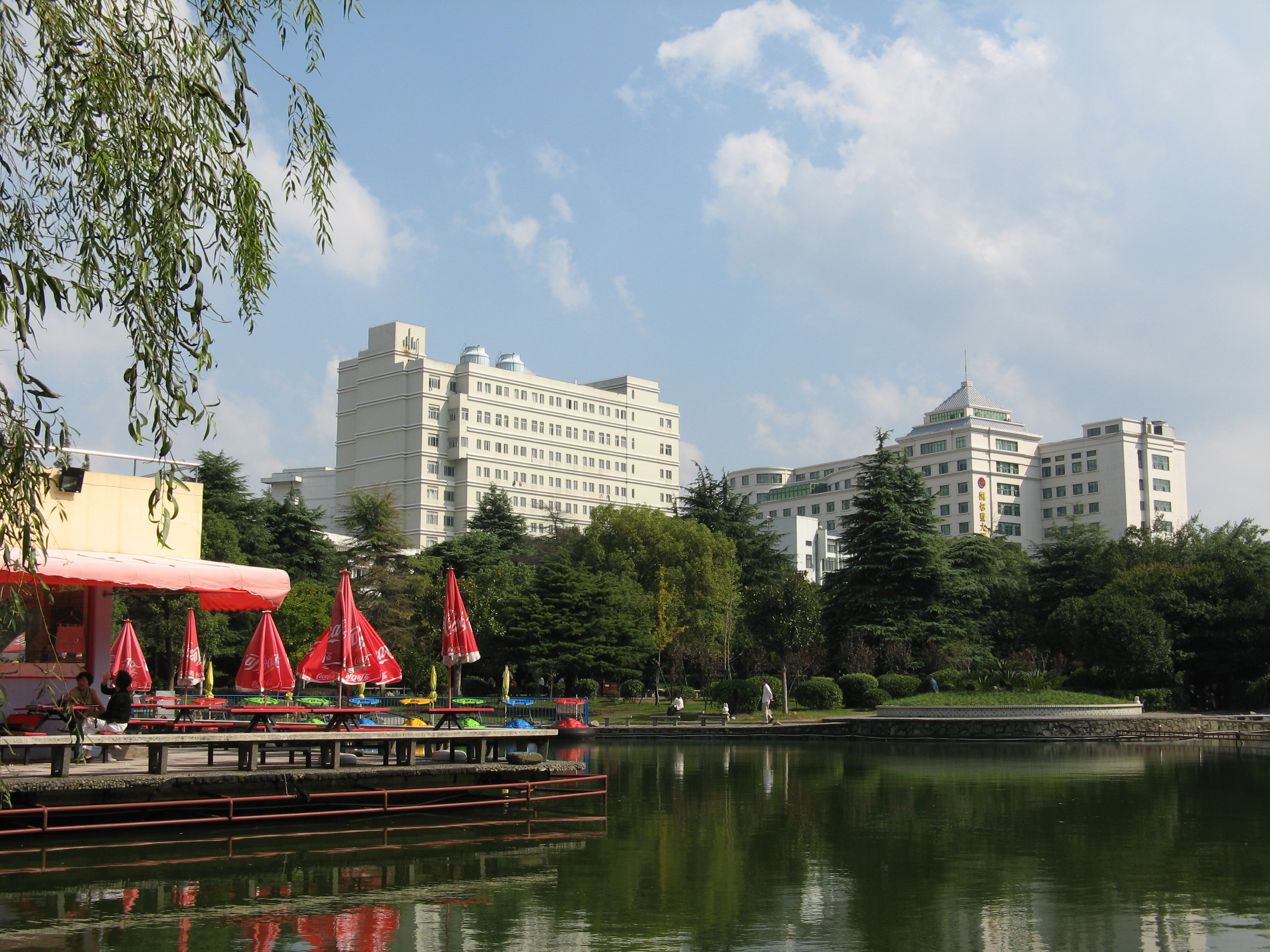
Dinghai Park, a major recreational and civic place, had been the only urban park in Dinghai for two decades before other parks opened.

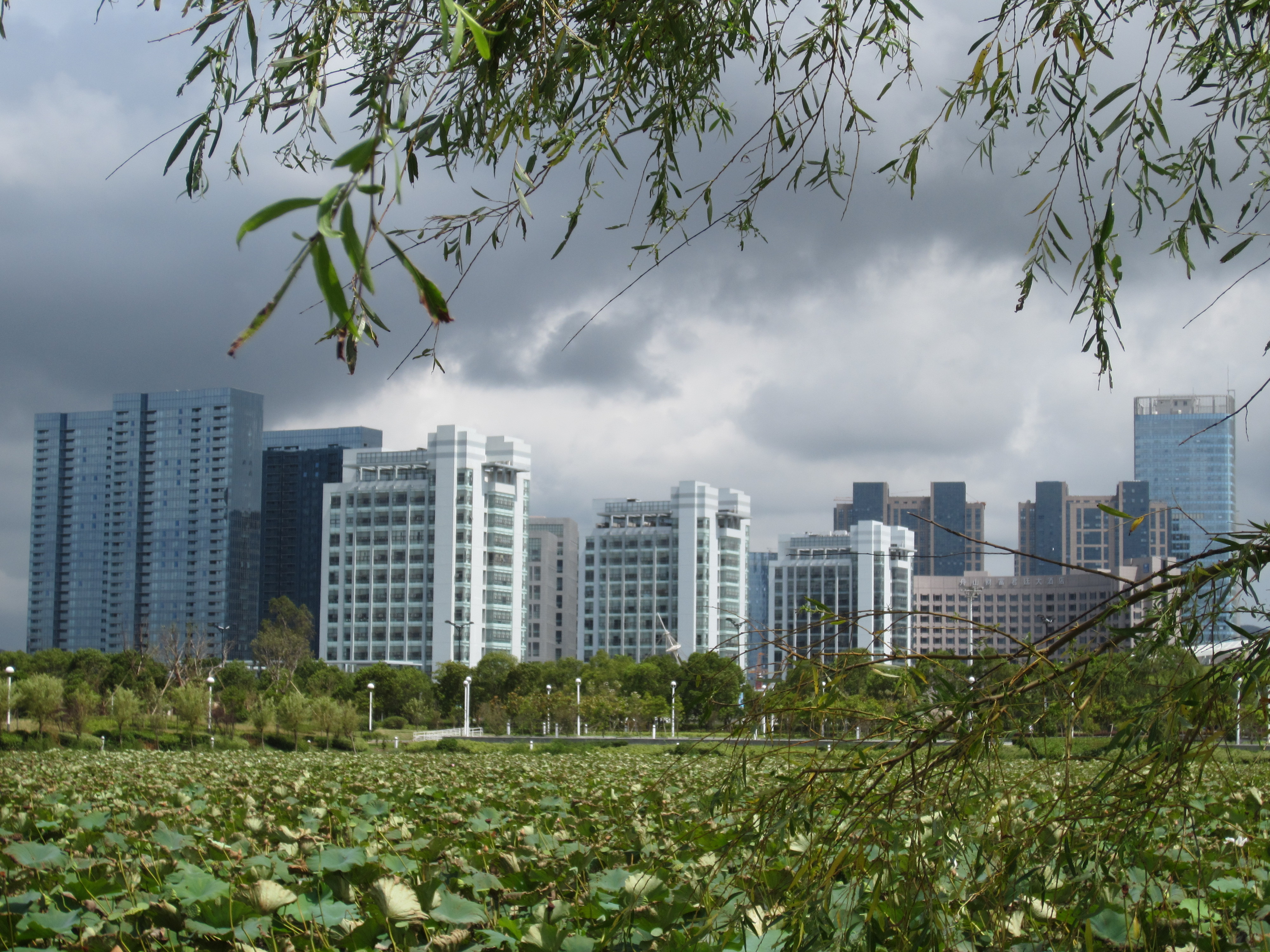
Lincheng Sub-District of Dinghai District has been designated by the Zhoushan municipal government as the newly planned and developed center for the city as well as the current municipal seat.

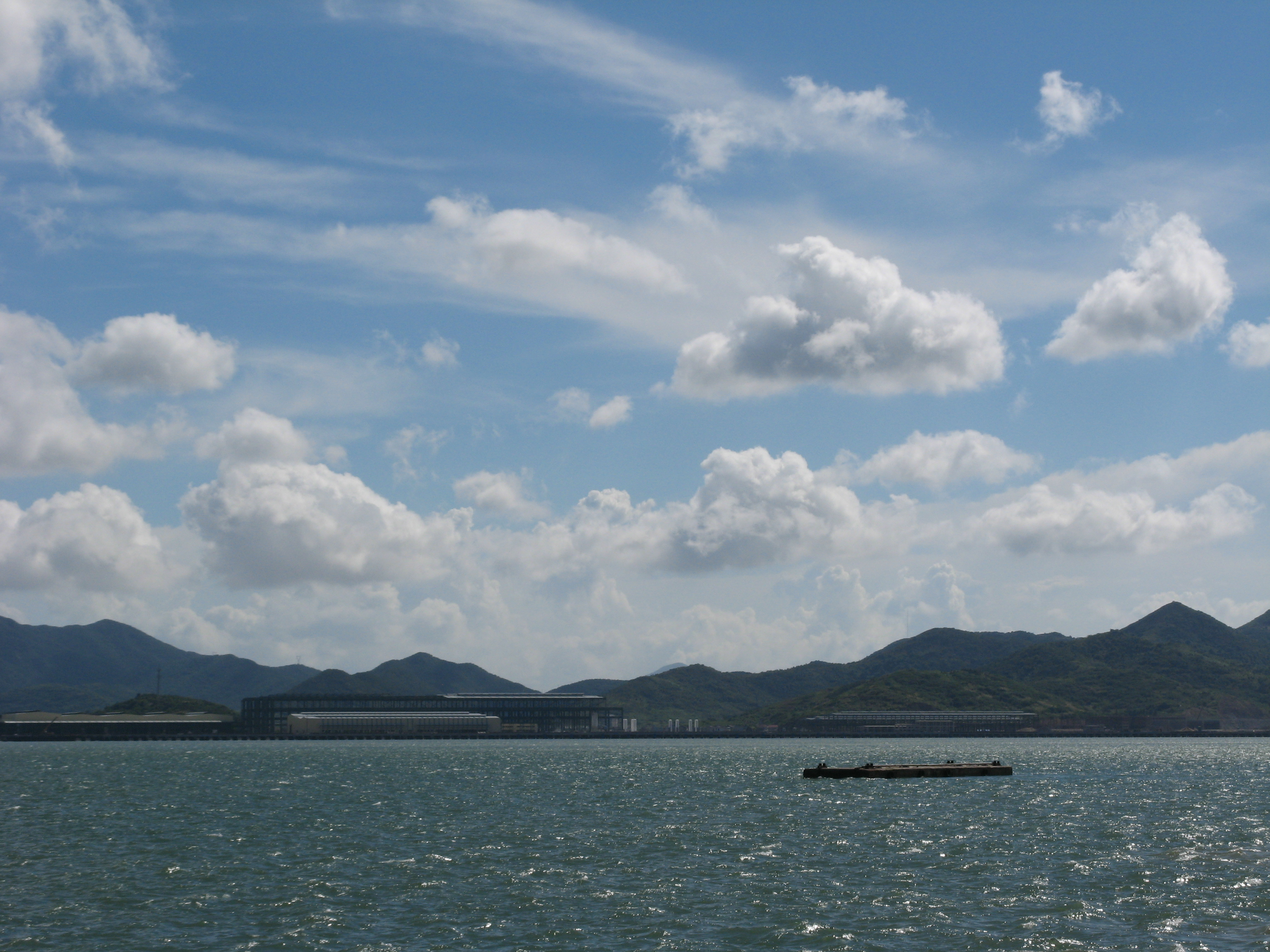
A clear day at Changbai Channel, the channel dividing Changbai Island and Zhoushan Main Island, from the ferry station with the Main Island as background.

Dinghai District administers consisted of 10 subdistricts and 3 towns. As of 2019, these township-level divisions were further divided into 41 residential communities, 73 rural villages, and 7 urban villages.

Township-level divisions of Dinghai District
English name	Subdivision Type	Chinese name	Population (2019)
Changguo Subdistrict	Subdistrict	昌国街道; Chāngguó Jiēdào	54,457
Huannan Subdistrict	Subdistrict	环南街道; Huánnán Jiēdào	34,874
Chengdong Subdistrict	Subdistrict	城东街道; Chéngdōng Jiēdào	51,578
Yancang Subdistrict	Subdistrict	盐仓街道; Yáncāng Jiēdào	19,600
Lincheng Subdistrict	Subdistrict	临城街道; Línchéng Jiēdào	46,886
Cengang Subdistrict	Subdistrict	岑港街道; Céngǎng Jiēdào	18,063
Ma'ao Subdistrict	Subdistrict	马岙街道; Mǎ'ào Jiēdào	9,653
Shuangqiao Subdistrict	Subdistrict	双桥街道; Shuāngqiáo Jiēdào	18,170
Xiaosha Subdistrict	Subdistrict	小沙街道; Xiǎoshā Jiēdào	19,802
Qiandao Subdistrict	Subdistrict	千岛街道; Qiāndǎo Jiēdào	39,189
Jintang	Town	金塘镇; Jīntáng Zhèn	40,074
Baiquan	Town	白泉镇; Báiquán Zhèn	37,144
Ganlan	Town	干𬒗镇; Gānlán Zhèn	9,892

=== Historic divisions ===
In July 1994, the district had 4 subdistricts, 7 towns, and 14 townships. The district's 4 subdistricts were Changguo Subdistrict, Huannan Subdistrict, Chengdong Subdistrict, and the now-defunct Jiefang Subdistrict. The district's 7 towns were Xiaosha (now a subdistrict), Cengang (now a subdistrict), Lincheng (now a subdistrict), Baiquan, Ganlan, the now-defunct Dafeng (大丰镇), and the now-defunct Ligang (沥港镇). The district's 14 townships were Ma'ao Township (now a subdistrict), Shantan Township (山潭乡), Changbai Township (长白乡), Dasha Township (大沙乡), Yandun Township (烟墩乡), Mamu Township (马目乡), Cezi Township (册子乡), Shijiao Township (石礁乡), Yancang Township (now a subdistrict), Ziwei Township (紫微乡), Changzhi Township (长峙乡), Beichan Township (北蝉乡), Panzhi Township (盘峙乡), and Damao Township (大猫乡).

By 2000, Ma'ao was promoted from a township to a town.

In September 2004, Lincheng was promoted from a town to a subdistrict.

In May 2008, the town of Jintang was set up.

In 2017, Qiandao Subdistrict split off from Lincheng Subdistrict.

== Demographics ==
As of 2019, Dinghai District has a population of 399,382 people, an increase of 1,813 (0.456%) from 2018. The district has 96.58 males per 100 females.

In the 2000 Chinese Census, the district had a population of 369,448.

== Economy ==
The district had a GDP of ¥31 billion as of 2011.

== People ==
- Jin Weiying (金维映)
- Qiao Shi（乔石）
- San Mao（三毛）
