= Li Tieying =

Chinese politician

- 李铁映

Vice Chairperson of the Standing Committee of the National People's Congress
- In office 18 March 2003 – 4 March 2008
- Chairperson: Wu Bangguo

President of the Chinese Academy of Social Sciences
- In office March 1998 – January 2003
- Preceded by: Hu Sheng
- Succeeded by: Chen Kuiyuan

Chairman of the State Commission for Restructuring Economy
- In office March 1993 – April 1998
- Preceded by: Chen Jinhua
- Succeeded by: Zhu Rongji
- In office April 1987 – April 1988
- Preceded by: Zhao Ziyang
- Succeeded by: Li Peng

Chairman of the State Education Commission
- In office 12 April 1988 – 29 March 1993
- Preceded by: Li Peng
- Succeeded by: Zhu Kaixuan

Minister of Electronics Industry
- In office June 1985 – April 1988
- Preceded by: Jiang Zemin
- Succeeded by: Zou Jiahua

Personal details
- Born: September 1936 (age 90) Bao'an County, Shaanxi, China
- Party: Chinese Communist Party
- Spouse: Qin Xinhua
- Children: Li Lijian
- Parent(s): Li Weihan and Jin Weiying
- Education: Beijing Foreign Studies University; Charles University; Shanghai International Studies University

Chinese name
- Simplified Chinese: 李铁映
- Traditional Chinese: 李鐵映
Transcriptions
Standard Mandarin
- Hanyu Pinyin: Lǐ Tiěyìng

Li Tieying (Chinese: 李铁映; born 1936) is a retired politician of the People's Republic of China. He held many positions since 1955, including Vice Chairman of the Standing Committee of the National People's Congress and President of the Chinese Academy of Social Sciences. He is an author of several books. For more than 20 years he served as Minister in charge of the State Commission for Economic Restructuring, and participated in major decision making and the implementation of China's economic reforms during that time.

== Early life ==
Li was born to Head of the Organization Department of the Chinese Communist Party Li Weihan and paramount leader of China (1978–1989) Deng Xiaoping's ex-wife Jin Weiying, who was one of 30 women participants in the Long March.

When studying at No. 2 Middle School attached to Beijing Normal University and Beijing Russian Language Training School (now Beijing Foreign Studies University) from 1950 to 1955, he joined the CCP in April 1955.

He started working in September 1961 as a senior engineer, after graduating from Faculty of Mathematics and Physics of Charles University in Czechoslovakia.

== Career ==
- Technician, deputy department director of No. 13 Research Institute of Ministry of National Defense in 1961–1966 (studied Japanese in Shanghai Foreign Languages Institute, now Shanghai International Studies University in 1964–1965);
- deputy department director of No. 1413 Research Institute of Fourth Machine-building Ministry in 1966–1970;
- department director of the ministry's No. 1424 Research Institute in 1970–1978;
- chief engineer, deputy director of the ministry's No. 1447 Research Institute, and concurrently deputy chairman of Shenyang City Commission of Science and Technology and Liaoning Provincial Association for Science and Technology in 1978–1981.
- Secretary, executive secretary of CCP Shenyang City Committee in 1981–1983;
- secretary of CCP Liaoning Provincial Committee in 1983–1984;
- secretary of CCP Liaoning Provincial Committee and concurrently secretary of CCP Haicheng County Committee, Liaoning Province, in 1984–1985.
- Minister of electronics industry, secretary of the ministry's Leading Party Members' Group in 1985–1987.
- Member of Political Bureau of CCP Central Committee, minister in charge of State Commission for Restructuring the Economy, secretary of the commission's Leading Party Members' Group, minister of electronics industry and secretary of the ministry's Leading Party Members' Group in 1987–1988.
- Member of Political Bureau of CCP Central Committee, state councilor and concurrently minister in charge of State Education Commission and secretary of its Leading Party Members' Group in 1988–1993.
- Member of Political Bureau of CCP Central Committee, state councilor and concurrently minister in charge of State Commission for Restructuring the Economy in 1993–1998.
- Member of Political Bureau of CCP Central Committee, president of Chinese Academy of Social Sciences and secretary of its Leading Party Members' Group in 1998–2002.
- President of Chinese Academy of Social Sciences and secretary of its Leading Party Members' Group in 2002 – January 2003.
- Alternate member, member of 12th CCP Central Committee; member, Political Bureau member of 13th, 14th, 15th CCP Central Committee.

== Published works ==
- Enrich Series on China's Economic Reform published by Enrich Professional Publishing
  - Vol.1 Reforming China: Theoretical Framework
  - Vol 2. Reforming China: Experiences and Lessons
  - Vol.3 Reforming China: Major Events (1978–1991)
  - Vol.4 Reforming China: Major Events (1992–2004)
  - Vol.5 Reforming China: International Comparisons and Reference

Government offices
Preceded by Jiang Zemin	Minister of Electronics Industry; 1985–1988	Succeeded by Zou Jiahua
Preceded by Zhao Ziyang	Chairperson of the State Commission for Restructuring Economy; 1987–1988	Succeeded by Li Peng
Preceded by Li Peng	Chairman of the State Education Commission; 1988–1993	Succeeded by Zhu Kaiyuan
Preceded by Chen Jinhua	Chairperson of the State Commission for Restructuring Economy; 1993–1998	Succeeded by Zhu Rongji
Academic offices
Preceded by Hu Sheng	President of the Chinese Academy of Social Sciences; 1998–2003	Succeeded by Chen Kaiyuan
Non-profit organization positions
Preceded by Ma Wenrui	China Yan'an Spiritual Research Association; 2004–2020	Succeeded by Wang Chen
