= 61 Renegades =

The case of the 61 Renegades Clique (Chinese: 六十一人叛徒集团案; pinyin: Liùshíyī rén pàntú jítuán àn) was initiated during the Cultural Revolution by Kang Sheng to accuse President Liu Shaoqi of being a traitor to Chairman Mao Zedong and the Chinese Communist Party.

Accusations centred on Liu Shaoqi's role in authorising the 61's recantation of their CCP allegiance as part of a Kuomintang prison release in 1936.

== History ==
=== Background ===
The 61 Communist Party figures were detained in Caolanzi Prison (草岚子监狱) in Beijing. Conditions there were particularly degrading, and CCP prisoners organised a number of hunger strikes to obtain basic amenities like food or showers.

In 1932, Bo Yibo had become south party branch leader, replacing Yin Jian - it was therefore during his term that the prison release plan would occur.

Party leadership instructed them to comply with a KMT proposition to grant early release in exchange for signing statements recanting their loyalty to the CCP. More specifically, reviewing a number of sources,^{e.g.:} Pamela Lubell has demonstrated that the CCP Northern Bureau (headed by Liu Shaoqi) and the Central Committee (represented by Zhang Wentian) were part of the decision-making chain while individual figures like Xu Bing and Kong Xiangzhen were involved in communicating the decision.

The first letter, published on the 31st of August 1936 in 华北日报 (North China Daily - a Newspaper under KMT control since 1934) stated:

"We are grateful for the [Republic of China] Government’s leniency in pardoning our misdeeds in the past and allowing us to repent and renew ourselves. Now we have repented sincerely and are willing to become loyal citizens, resolutely against Communism, under the Government leadership. Hereafter we will never join any Communist organization nor engage in any reactionary activities. We also hope all promising youths shall not come under the influence of Communist agitation.”

Liu Geping, a CCP member of Hui origin, was also imprisoned in Caolanzi but was among the few to refuse to sign the announcement, serving his full sentence until his release in April 1944. He later would gain widespread admiration for this decision and was heralded as a hero amid Cultural Revolution era purges of the 61.

=== Cultural Revolution condemnation and purges ===
This historical episode was re-opened in the final stages of Liu Shaoqi's downfall and purge. On March 16 1967, the Central Committee issued the "Instructions Regarding Rebellion Materials Related to the Confessions by Bo Yibo, Liu Lantao, An Ziwen, Yang Xianzhen, et al." which labelled all 61 a "traitorous clique" and Liu Shaoqi as their leader. In October 1968, the Central Case Examination Group (CCEG) (中央专案组) submitted the "Investigation Report on the Crimes Committed by Renegade, Traitor and Scab Liu Shaoqi" to the Twelfth Plenum of the Eighth Central Committee, citing the case of the 61 as one of its accusations. The Report accused Liu of "instigating 61 traitors (...) to publish an 'anti-communist announcement' to declare that they surrendered to Kuomintang [or Guomindang] and betrayed the communist party". A 1980 Central Commission for Discipline Inspection (CDIC) report would later describe this indictment as "the biggest frameup the CCP (...) has ever known in its history (...) created out of thin air". Still, Liu was purged on the 1st of November 1968 and, simultaneously, particularly between January 1967 and early 1968, many of the surviving 61, as well as others connected to the case (e.g. Xu Bing and Kong Xiangzhen), were arrested and imprisoned.

The interrogation and detention of Liu Lantao, First Secretary of the CCP's Northwest Bureau and one of the "61 Renegades", is described in Caolan Chunqiu. "During the day [CCEG interrogators] punished him indiscriminately and at night they deprived him of sleep. (…) His cell was abnormally cold, and he developed chilblains on his hands and feet. The cold made his toenails fall off. He began to spit blood, suffer from inflammation of the kidneys, abdominal pains, inability to urinate, appendicitis, and a variety of illnesses.(…) Liu Lantao became thin and bony, dropping in weight from 70 to less than 40 kilos." He would finally be released in 1975, officially lost his CCP membership, and was banished to Anqing, Anhui - only then was he informed his wife, Liu Sufei (刘素菲), had committed suicide 7 years earlier after Kang Sheng accused her of being a "special agent".

=== Post 1978 rehabilitation ===
After the verdict was officially overturned in 1978, many were rehabilitated in the post-Mao Zedong era, first as Hua Guofeng's power decreased and under Deng Xiaoping. Liu Shaoqi was posthumously rehabilitated, including at the fifth plenum of the 11th Party Congress in 1980 where the label of "renegade, scab, and traitor" was rescinded. A detailed account of his imprisonment, torture, and death in Kaifeng in 1969 was published - largely exonerating Mao and blaming Lin Biao and the Gang of Four instead.

Of the twenty-six surviving members of the 61, some resumed their political lives and would play significant roles in the Deng era. Liu Lantao was appointed vice-minister of the United Front Work Department in 1978 and later became vice-chairman of the Standing Committeee of the (Fifth) Chinese People's Political Consultative Conference (CPCC). Yang Xianzhen, Ma Huizhi (马辉之), and Li Chuli were appointed to the CPCC in June 1979.

Still, excluding these few notable exceptions, the majority of the rehabilitated were offered honorary and "advisory" position and would not remain throughout Deng's campaigns to promote younger cadres. Bo Yibo and Liu Lantao, despite regaining their Central Committee memberships, did not regain their Eighth Central Committee Politburo positions, nor did Liu return to the Secretariat. Yang Xianzhen was among those with the most limited rehabilitation, not even regaining his alternate membership to the Central Committee.

== Members ==
Members (organised by situation and, where applicable, positions held in 1966 and incomplete list of arrests and imprisonment):

- High- (24) and Middle- (13) ranking officials:
  - Bo Yibo (Vice-premier and chairman of the State Economic Commission (SEC)) placed in detention in January 1967 and formally imprisoned in early 1968,
  - An Ziwen (Director of the Organisation Department of the CCP (COD)) detained since August 1966, imprisoned in January 1968,
  - Yang Xianzhen (Vice-president of the Central Party School until 1965) detained since May 1967 and imprisoned in September,
  - Zhou Zhongying (Vice-chairman of the SEC, member of the Central Control Commission),
  - Ma Huizhi (Vice-minister of communications),
  - Xu Zirong (Vice-minister of public security) arrested in January 1967,
  - Fu Yutian (Vice-chairman of the Guangxi Zhuang Autonomous Region Committee),
  - Liu Chuli (Deputy-director of the Organisation Department),
  - Wang De (Alternate Secretary for the Central South Bureau of the Chinese Communist Party and director of its Organisation Department),
  - Hou Zhenya (Secretary of the Fujian CCP Provincial Committee Secretariat) arrested in January 1967,
  - Wang Qimei (Deputy Secretary of the Tibet CCP Working Committee),
  - Liu Youguang (Vice-minister of the Seventh Ministry of Machine Building),
  - Hu Xikui (Secretary of the Northwest Bureau Secretariat),
  - Liao Luyan (Minister of Agriculture),
  - Zhang Xi (Vice-chairman of the State Planning Commission until his death in 1959),
  - Li Liguo,
  - Liu Lantao (member of the Central Control Commission and first secretary of the Northwest China Bureau of the Chinese Communist Party) placed in detention in January 1967 and formally imprisoned in January 1968,
  - Liu Xiwu (member of the Central Control Commission) arrested in January 1967,
  - Li Chuli (member of the Central Control Commission),
  - Liu Shenzhi (member of the Central Control Commission, Member of the East China Bureau Standing Committee and director of its Control Committee),
  - Wang Hefeng (member of the Central Control Commission, Secretary of the Northeast China Bureau Control Committee),
  - Peng De,
  - Hu Jingyi (Director of the Second Archives Office of the Central Committee),
  - Liu Zijiu, and
  - Zhao Lin (Acting first secretary of the Jilin CCP Provincial Committee).
  - Wang Xinbo arrested in January 1967,
- Low-ranking posts (5 people)
- Killed in action (10 people): Dong Tianzhi, Xian Weixun, Yi Mingdao, Zhang Youqing, Zhang Manping, Zhao Bo, Wang Yong, Xia Fuhai, Ma Yutang, Wang Zhenlin
- Died after being released from prison (5 people): 4 died of illnesses: Yin Jian, Qiu Shaoshang, Gao Tingkai, Hao Jinbo, and one, Liu Kerang, was 'mistakenly' executed in the liberated area
- Committed suicide (1 person): Han Jun
- Defected to Kuomintang after being released from prison (2 people)
- Unknown fate (3 people)
