= National Political Consultative Hall =

Chinese government building

- 全国政协礼堂
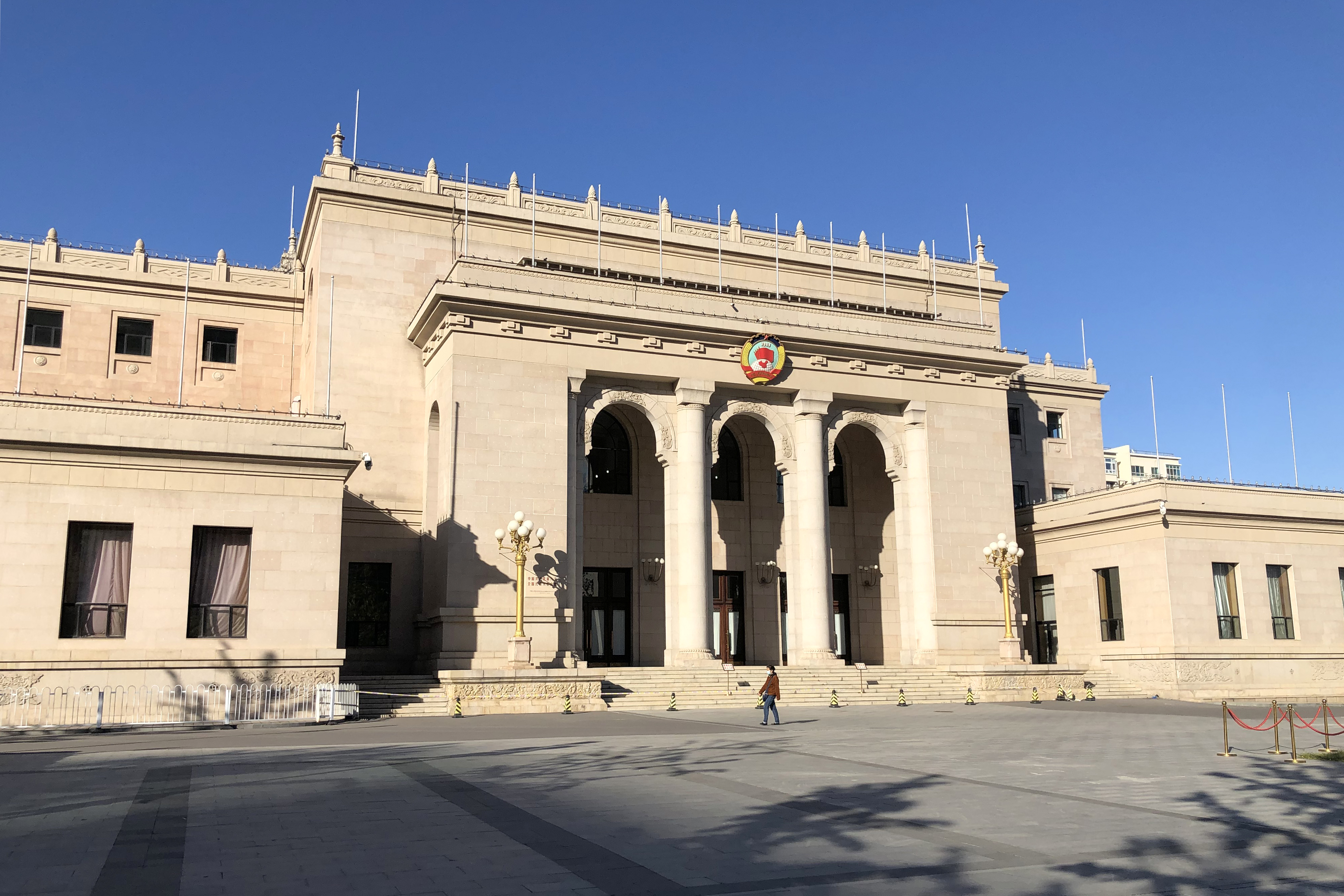
- Interactive map of the National Political Consultative Hall area

General information
- Location: No. 23 Taipingqiao Street; Xicheng, Beijing, China
- Coordinates: 39.9183°N 116.3578°E

The National Political Consultative Hall is located at No. 23 Taipingqiao Street, Xicheng District, Beijing. It is managed by the National Political Consultative Hall Management Office, a public institution directly under the General Office of the National Committee of the Chinese People's Political Consultative Conference.

== History ==
The construction of the National Political Consultative Hall began in 1954 and was completed in 1956. It is a European-style building and one of the earliest important buildings in the People's Republic of China . The auditorium is the venue for the CPPCC Standing Committee meetings, special consultation meetings, and meetings of various special committees. It was also the main venue for the 8th National Congress of the Chinese Communist Party. In 1995, the National Political Consultative Hall was comprehensively reinforced and renovated, and was fully opened to the public after its completion in 1996. A new CPPCC Cultural Plaza was built on the south side of the auditorium.

The National Political Consultative Hall an area of 5,600 square meters, with a total construction area of 16,000 square meters. It has the CPPCC Square to its south. It is a comprehensive multifunctional venue that integrates conferences, performances, catering, fitness, entertainment, leisure and social activities.

The National Political Consultative Hall is affiliated to the General Office of the CPPCC, and is known internally as the National Political Consultative Hall Management Office. It is a deficit-subsidized institution of the CPPCC. The Auditorium Management Office implements a corporate management system that combines the division of responsibilities of the director (general manager) and the responsibility system of the section chief (department manager).

The National Political Consultative Hall Management Office is run by the CPPCC Office Service Center (CPPCC Office Service Bureau) and is responsible for managing the CPPCC Auditorium and providing venues and services for major events held by the Party, the State and the CPPCC system. The National Political Consultative Hall Management Office is responsible for the venue management and facility maintenance of the National Political Consultative Hall, and provides venues for meetings and banquets, exhibitions and cultural activities, and related services.
