= Gao Gang Affair =

Chinese Communist Party internal dispute

The Gao Gang Affair, also known as the Gao-Rao Affair, was Gao Gang's attempt to displace Liu Shaoqi and Zhou Enlai from key posts in the government, and to increase his own standing within the Chinese Communist Party (CCP). Because of Mao Zedong's apparent displeasure with the previous failures of Liu and Zhou, Gao assumed that he had Mao's approval for such a move and began to approach senior cadres in the summer of 1953 asking for support. Gao leaked a list of Politburo members drafted by An Ziwen, the vice chief of the CCP Personnel Department, making Mao suspicious of Gao's intentions before the upcoming CCP Eighth Congress. While sources disagree on the reason for An's creation of the list, Gao mentioned and referred to the confidential document during meetings, believing that it was Liu's ploy to leverage his own position in the party. Gao had spoken to several other cadres about the matter including Chen Yun and Deng Xiaoping, who saw Gao's plan as an effort to overthrow Liu Shaoqi entirely. Deng revealed a more detailed account of Gao's "underground activities" in 1980, stating that "he tried to win me over and had formal negotiations with me in which he said that Comrade Liu Shaoqi was immature. He was trying to persuade me to join in his effort to topple Comrade Liu Shaoqi." When Chen Yun and Deng Xiaoping officially informed Mao of Gao's activities, the chairman declared them out of order, and efforts were undertaken to address the perceived threat to party unity. Gao killed himself in August 1954.

== Preliminary discussions with party leaders ==
Mao had a series of private conversations with Gao in late 1952 or early 1953 where it is believed he expressed a degree of dissatisfaction with Liu and Zhou, apparently remarking that they were too cautious in their attitude towards the pace of socialist transformation in China. Implementation of the new tax system was among the issues leading to this dissatisfaction. In one conversation, Mao asked Gao if Gao was "willing to head the cabinet if Enlai no longer served as premier" and Gao responded, "Maybe Lin Biao should be considered." In an early 1953 conversation, Mao told Gao that Mao considered dividing central leadership into a first and second line, and that Mao would recede to the second line. Gao relayed this idea to deputy chief of the Central Personnel Department An Ziwen, telling An, "the chairman had discussed with him that the Politburo would be reorganized and that various central posts would be strengthened."

In March 1953, An prepared a candidate list for the Politburo. Academic Chen Jian writes that the list was probably originated from the idea that Mao had relayed to Gao earlier that year. Mao learned of the list and criticised An for preparing it without authority; An acknowledged the error and made a self-criticism. Mao instructed, "[T]his thing stops here. No further spreading of it should be allowed!" Gao and Rao Shushi (who was the director of the Central Personnel Department) disobeyed the order continued sharing the list with others in leadership. This later became an important factor in the contention that they had formed a "Gao-Rao anti-party clique."

Following this, Gao approached senior party members, expressed his views regarding Liu and Zhou, and implied that Gao had Mao's approval. Rao, a military figure who had his power base in East China and was chief of the Organization Department of the Chinese Communist Party, gave his support to Gao. Immediately after his conference with Rao, Gao toured the southern and eastern provinces in order to discuss his views with other military leaders, primarily Lin Biao, Peng Dehuai, and Zhu De. During these visits, Gao continued to discuss the Politburo candidate list prepared by An.

Lin Biao gave no practical support, but his agreement with Gao's views possibly influenced Gao to continue to seek backing. Peng Dehuai, who was known to have some antipathy against Gao's main target Liu Shaoqi, also expressed some support, but like Lin he did nothing in particular to aid Gao. When Gao approached Luo Ronghuan, Luo demanded to know Mao's exact thoughts. He was doubtful whether Mao had actually endorsed such suggestions and told Gao that their discussion on a matter of such significance was inappropriate.

== Negative party reactions and death ==
When Gao expressed his thoughts to Li Xiannian, Chen Yun and Deng Xiaoping, they were all concerned that his attempts were a threat to party unity. Chen and Li informed Zhou Enlai first about Gao's activities and then spoke to Mao. Deng also approached Mao directly about Gao's approach. Mao instructed Chen Yun to visit the places where Gao had toured and to tell the leaders Gao had spoken with, "Don't be fooled by Gao."

On 15 December, Mao asked Gao who had leaked the candidate list written by An. Gao did not admit that he had shared the document with others.

At a Politburo meeting on 24 December 1953, Mao confronted Gao and gave him a serious warning that his activities were a severe threat to party unity. At the conference, Mao's position was clear: he condemned Gao for forming "an anti-Party alliance".

On 19 January, Gao wrote Mao stating that Gao had made mistakes and was willing to make self-criticism at the upcoming plenum, and he hoped to speak with Mao. Gao asked Yang Shangkun to deliver the letter, and Yang instead gave it to Liu Shaoqi who called a meeting with others in leadership.

This effectively marked the end of Gao's attempts to advance his position as he realized that he did not in fact have Mao's support. Mao then entrusted Liu Shaoqi, one of the targets of Gao's brief attempt to gain power, with the organization of a plenum in February 1954 that would focus on party unity.

Round table meetings following the Plenum included stronger criticism of Gao. On 17 February, Gao attempted to kill himself by shooting himself; he did not die. His secretary knocked the gun away so that Gao shot the wall instead of himself. Criticism of Gao increased after his attempted suicide. In a speech on 25 February, Zhou Enlai made several accusations against Gao Gang. Zhou accused Gao first of setting up an "independent kingdom", a reference to Gao's power base in the northeast; and second of having "mixed up right and wrong in Soviet relations", a hint at Gao's alleged close ties to the Soviets; and finally of 'fabricating Comrade Mao Zedong's words', as Gao had told others that his plans had Mao's support. Zhou contradicted Gao's belief that the military should play a preeminent role in Chinese politics, condemned Gao's attempts to spread "rumors" about Liu and other leaders, and concluded that Gao's intention was to sow discord and to usurp power within the party and the state. Zhou also condemned Gao's dissolute lifestyle.

Gao faced additional criticisms from within the Party, including false claims. Gao was placed under house arrest to receive reeducation. While on house arrest in August 1954, Gao killed himself with sleeping pills.

In 1955, Gao was formally expelled from the Party. Gao's ally, Rao, was also expelled from the CCP, and was jailed until his death in 1975.

== Analysis ==
Gao's assumption that Mao would support the elimination of Zhou and Liu, despite Mao's dissatisfaction with them, was mistaken. At the time, Mao was still relatively tolerant of differing opinions, but was confident that both Liu and Zhou would align their views with Mao if pressed. Mao was satisfied with the "unity" that had been achieved by the Yan'an Rectification Movement, and had no intention of altering the basic party structure that had been established at the 1945 Party Congress. Mao disagreed with Gao's own opinion of his role in the revolution (which Mao thought was inflated), and clearly believed that the party should retain a clear command over the state and the military. If Gao's views of the importance of the army in the revolution had prevailed, they would have contradicted Mao's interpretation of the party's history and would have threatened Mao's preeminent position of leadership.

The "Gao Gang Affair" showed the real risk of factional splits within the party during the first few years of the People's Republic of China, a period that is often seen to be an era of party unity. By attempting to exploit grievances held by some cadres against others, Gao was able to attract the interests of several significant cadres, even if none of them truly backed him. The "Gao Gang Affair" can be viewed simply as a stillborn coup attempt within the Politburo, but its significance is not that it failed to succeed or even to gather basic support. Rather, it showed that there was the possibility of power struggles within the Party that could involve the targeting of very senior Party members. Following the "Gao Gang Affair" there were calls for greater Party unity and there was an increase in centralization as the old regional administrations with their Party and military bodies were abolished, a change that had been planned for some time but that was no doubt spurred on by Gao's attempts to use his regional power to gain power at the center.

Another factor that has often been explored, and probably had great importance at the time, is the Soviet connection. Gao's actions were certainly not seen as a Soviet-backed move against the Chinese Communists, but it is certain that Gao's connections with the Soviets made people suspicious of him. Because Sino-Soviet relations were tense but close (the party endorsed Soviet methods of economic planning but wanted to make sure that the Soviets did not gain increased influence over China) the impression, however slight, that Gao's attempts to gain power might have had links to his friendship with the Soviets would have been viewed with alarm. This can be seen in Zhou Enlai's public comments against Gao at the February 1954 meetings where he charged him with having "mixed up right and wrong in Soviet relations". According to the account Nikita Khrushchev provides in his memoirs, Gao was the Soviet leadership's primary source of information about "the mood in the Chinese Party" and Stalin, apparently driven by the desire to win Mao's trust, handed some of the diplomatic cables from Soviet Ambassador Aleksandr Panyushkin over to Mao. In Khrushchev's opinion, the "betrayal" by Stalin was key to Gao Gang's subsequent fate.

Gao's death not only brought closure to the affair but also made sure that he was duly remembered in a dishonorable fashion as a traitor to the party. Some sources refer to the fall of Gao Gang, along with Rao Shushi, as a prime example of Mao's use of 'Character Assassination' to defeat surrounding political officials in the CCP hierarchy.

Academic Chen Jian writes that although Mao was unsatisfied with Gao and sought to teach him a serious lesson, Mao did not intend to destroy Gao, who shared many of his politics and was a capable figure in the Party. Chen contends that Mao had sought to "freeze" Gao for a while and release him later, crediting Mao's subsequent statements that Mao had considered sending Gao back to Shaanbei with his Party membership and place on the Central Committee intact and that he "fe[lt] very sorry" for not acting before Gao's death.

According to Michael Sheng's analysis of newly-available records, the Gao Gang Affair may have been the backfiring of Mao's attempt to raise the profile of regional leaders like Gao Gang to weaken the role of the "managerial elite" led by Liu Shaoqi and Zhou Enlai, whom he feared would sideline him. When Mao started to have doubts about Gao's loyalty, he quickly abandoned Gao.
