= An Min (politician) =

Chinese politician

An Min (Chinese: 安民; born April 1945) is a Chinese politician, former Vice Minister of Ministry of Foreign Trade and Ministry of Commerce in China.

== Biography ==
An Min was born in April 1945 in Shaanxi, the first son of An Ziwen. He graduated from the University of International Relations with a bachelor's degree in English in 1970.

He worked for China's Ministry of Foreign Trade from 1979 to 2003 and became the Vice Minister of Foreign Trade in 2001. When the Ministry of Foreign Trade reorganized and changed its name to Ministry of Commerce in 2003, he was appointed Vice Minister of Ministry of Commerce in China.
