= Li Weihan =

Chinese politician

- 李维汉
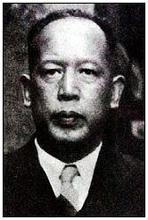
- Li in 1946

Vice Chairman of the Central Advisory Commission
- In office 12 September 1982 – 11 August 1984
- Chairman: Deng Xiaoping

Vice Chairman of the Chinese People's Political Consultative Conference
- In office 2 July 1979 – 17 June 1983
- Chairman: Deng Xiaoping
- In office 25 December 1954 – 5 January 1965
- Chairperson: Zhou Enlai

Vice Chairman of the Standing Committee of the National People's Congress
- In office 27 September 1954 – 3 January 1965
- Chairman: Liu Shaoqi; Zhu De

Secretary-General of Government Administration Council
- In office 19 October 1949 – 18 September 1953
- Premier: Zhou Enlai
- Preceded by: New title
- Succeeded by: Xu Bing

Head of the United Front Work Department of the Chinese Communist Party
- In office 26 September 1948 – 25 December 1964
- Preceded by: Zhou Enlai
- Succeeded by: Xu Bing

Head of the Organization Department of the Chinese Communist Party
- In office 9 August 1927 – 23 September 1927
- Preceded by: Zhang Guotao
- Succeeded by: Luo Yinong

Member of the Politburo Standing Committee of the Chinese Communist Party
- In office 9 August 1927 – 19 June 1928
- General Secretary: Chen Duxiu

Personal details
- Born: 2 June 1896 Changsha County, Hunan, Qing Empire
- Died: 11 August 1984 (aged 88) Beijing, China
- Party: Chinese Communist Party
- Spouse(s): Cao Wenyu; Jin Weiying; Wu Jingzhi
- Children: 5, including Li Tieying
- Education: Hunan First Normal University

Chinese name
- Simplified Chinese: 李维汉
- Traditional Chinese: 李維漢
Transcriptions
Standard Mandarin
- Hanyu Pinyin: Lǐ Wéihàn

Li Weihan (Chinese: 李维汉; 2 June 1896 – 11 August 1984) was a Chinese Communist Party politician from Hunan. A Long March veteran, Li led the Central Party School in Yan'an. After the founding of the People's Republic of China, he was the Chairman of the State Ethnic Affairs Commission and led the United Front Department until 1964. As director of the UFWD, Li's view was that the CCP should accommodate and seek to raise the political consciousness of religious believers, contending that believers were generally "patriotic". In the 1960s, Li was politically targeted because of his comparatively soft line on religious policy. Politically rehabilitated in 1978, Li was later appointed to the Central Advisory Commission. Li died in 1984.

== Biography ==
Li was from Hunan. After pursuing his studies in France, where he worked with Deng Xiaoping, he returned to China for the first National Congress of the Chinese Communist Party in Shanghai in 1921. He studied at the Hunan Self-Study University founded by Mao Zedong. Li became a member of the 6th Politburo of the Chinese Communist Party in 1927 but fell out of favour shortly afterwards in the wake of the unsuccessful Autumn Harvest Uprising in junction of Hunan and Jiangxi provinces. When he sought to bring the uprising to an end, he found himself accused of cowardice. Li was eclipsed until reemerging in the early 1930s as a supporter of Li Lisan, a leading figure in the CCP at the time, and an opponent of the anti-Mao 28 Bolsheviks faction.

Li was a veteran of the Long March. Li Weihan was promoted to become the first principal of the Yan'an-based Central Party School of the Chinese Communist Party, the highest training center for party workers and leaders. Li served as principal from 1933 to 1935 and again from 1937 to 1938. After the Proclamation of the People's Republic of China in 1949, Li was involved in managing China's minorities and nationalities as Chairman of the State Ethnic Affairs Commission. He was also a significant player in the CCP's drive to introduce state control of the economy (Soviet-type economic planning), and in the late-1950s Anti-Rightist Campaign, in which his own brother was purged.

Li was the director between 1944 and 1964 of the United Front Department, the predecessor to the present-day United Front Work Department. Regarding religious policy, Li's view was that there were few counterrevolutionaries among religious believers, and that the majority were "patriotic". He believed that the CCP should be patient with most religious believers and work to increase their political consciousness. Li contended that the CCP should avoid harsh stances on religion, deeming harsh measures as counterproductive and damaging to the Party's credibility.

In the 1960s, Li was investigated and targeting politically, in part because of his accommodating stance regarding religious believers. He was removed from his post in 1964 and was subsequently criticised by Zhou Enlai for "capitulationism in united front work".

Ulanhu politically rehabilitated Li in spring 1978, stating that the "cap" of shame previously placed on the UFWD and those like Li was now removed. Li reemerged after 1978 as a supporter of the reformist Deng Xiaoping – who Li had saved from persecution years before – and as a critic of Mao and autocracy in the CCP, which Li referred to as "feudalism".

In 1981, Li's 1950s-1960s essays on religion were republished in The Question of the United Front and the Question of the Nationalities. Li wrote:

As we uphold the policy of the freedom of religious belief, domestically, we may manage to unite the majority within the various religious fields to serve socialism and to isolate those few reactionaries; internationally, it is helpful to integrate the various religious entities into an anti-imperialist united front and peace movement, thus countering any sabotage by reactionaries.

Deng promoted Li in 1982 to the post of vice chairman of the Central Advisory Commission, which Deng himself chaired. Li died in office in August 1984.

== See also ==
- Historical Museum of French-Chinese Friendship

Party political offices
| Preceded by Zhang Guotao | Head of the Organization Department of the Chinese Communist Party; 1927–1927 | Succeeded by Luo Yinong |
| Preceded by Zhang Wentian | President of Central Party School of the Chinese Communist Party; 1934–1935 | Succeeded by Dong Biwu |
| Preceded by Dong Biwu | President of Central Party School of the Chinese Communist Party; 1937–1938 | Succeeded by Kang Sheng |
| Preceded by Zhou Enlai | Head of the United Front Work Department; 1948–1964 | Succeeded by Xu Bing |
Government offices
| New title | Secretary-General of Government Administration Council; 1949–1953 | Succeeded by Xi Zhongxun |
