= Xu Bing (politician) =

Chinese politician (1903–1972)

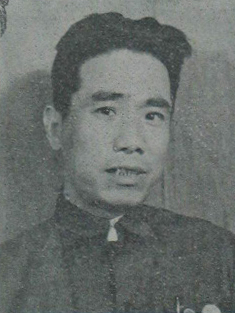
Xu Bing

Xu Bing (Chinese: 徐冰; February 1903 – 18 March 1972) was a Chinese male politician and a member of the Chinese Communist Party, who served as the vice chairperson of the Chinese People's Political Consultative Conference.

Xu Bing died after being jailed amid the Cultural Revolution for charges associating him to the 61 Renegades fabricated conspiracy.
