= An Ziwen =

Chinese politician

- 安子文
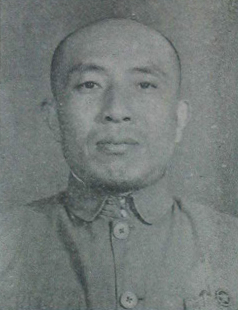

Head of the Organization Department of the Chinese Communist Party
- In office November 1956 – August 1966
- Preceded by: He Guoqiang
- Succeeded by: Guo Yufeng

Deputy Secretary of the Central Commission for Discipline Inspection
- In office November 1949 – 31 March 1955 Serving with Wang Congwu, Qiang Ying, Liu Lantao, Xie Juezai, Li Baohua, Liu Jingfan, Xue Muqiao, Liang Hua & Feng Naichao

Personal details
- Born: 25 September 1909 Zizhou, Shaanxi
- Died: 25 June 1980 (aged 70)
- Party: Chinese Communist Party

An Ziwen (Chinese: 安子文; pinyin: Ān Zǐwén; 25 September 1909 – 25 June 1980), born as An Zhihan (安之瀚), was a Chinese politician and member of the Central Committee of the Chinese Communist Party. He served as minister of the CCP Central Committee Organization Department, the Central People's Government Minister of Personnel, deputy secretary of the Central Discipline Inspection Commission, the Standing Committee of the CPPCC National Committee, among other roles. He authored the book "Revolutionary successors training is a strategic task of the party".

== Biography ==
An was born in September 1909 in Zizhou County, Shaanxi province. In 1925, he joined the Chinese Communist Youth League, and in 1927 was inducted into the Chinese Communist Party. He participated in the Second Sino-Japanese War and the Chinese Civil War.

In 1949, An was appointed as head of the Personnel Ministry, and was elected as a CPPCC Standing Committee member. He served as vice minister of the Central Organization Department, and was appointed as the Central Commission for Discipline Inspection and deputy secretary. In 1956, at the Eighth CCP National Congress, he was elected as head of the CCP Central Organization Department.

In his role as vice minister of the Central Organization Department, An played a major role in the Gao Gang Affair. Gao Gang, by then a Politburo member and close associate of Mao Zedong, shared with An Mao's consideration to divide the central leadership into a first and second line. Without direct instruction, An privately composed a list of candidates for Politburo positions. Mao obtained the list. Gao was later shown the list by Mao's secretary. Gao noted that Bo Yibo, a close associate of his rival Liu Shaoqi, was included on the list of candidates. Lin Biao, a close associate of Gao, was excluded. Gao suspected that Liu had backed An in compiling the list. Liu later denied the accusation. An was criticized by Mao for compiling the list and submitted a written self-criticism. Mao warned other party members to drop the issue.

In summer 1953, Rao Shushi, the director of the Central Organization Department and An's boss, learned of the list. Rao, who did not have a good relationship with An, was seriously offended and looked to use the issue to entangle An politically. Liu Shaoqi advised Rao to drop the issue as per Mao's order, but was ignored. Later that year, Gao Gang toured southern China and met with many provincial leaders. Gao attacked Liu during many of the meetings, using the An list as a key part of his arguments. Mao was upset upon learning of Gao's attacks on Liu. Mao confronted Gao after a Central Secretariat meeting in December 1953. Mao asked if Gao had leaked the contents of the list in conversations with other party officials. Gao denied the accusation, to Mao's dismay. In 1954, the spreading of the list and rumors associated with it was listed of Gao's "ten big crimes" by Zhou Enlai, and was a critical justification for the purge of Rao.

In his 1964 article Fostering Revolutionary Successors as a Strategic Task for the Party, An wrote about the threat posed by the peaceful evolution theory propounded by John Foster Dulles. In particular, An focused on Dulles's statement at an October 28, 1958 press conference that peaceful evolution was "absolutely possible in a few hundred years, but perhaps just a matter of a few decades."

In 1966, at the beginning of the Cultural Revolution, he was persecuted for his close association with Liu Shaoqi as one of the 61 Renegades and expelled from his posts. In 1978 under Deng Xiaoping, he was rehabilitated and appointed as vice president of the Central Party School, the latter co-opted to the Central Committee. On 25 June 1980, he died in Beijing.

== Family ==
An Ziwen married Liu Jingxiong, come from Shanxi province. They have three children. Specific information is as follows:

=== Wife ===
Liu Jingxiong (刘竞雄), daughter of Chinese politician and official Liu Shaobai

=== Children ===
- An Li (安黎), former vice mayor of Shanmen, eldest daughter of An Ziwen
- An Min (安民), former Vice Minister of Ministry of Foreign Trade and Ministry of Commerce
- An Guo (安国)

=== Brothers ===
An Zhiwen (安志文), third brother of An ziwen and alternate delegate of 12th National Congress of the Chinese Communist Party

=== Nephew ===
An Jiaoju (安鲛驹), general of Chinese People's Armed Police Force (PAP)

== See also ==
- 61 Renegades (zh:六十一人叛徒集团案)

| Preceded by None | Head of the Central People's Government Personnel Ministry; 1950–1954 | Succeeded by None |
| Preceded by Deng Xiaoping | Head of the Organization Department of the Chinese Communist Party; 1956–1966 | Succeeded by Guo Yufeng in 1975 |
