= Kuchino =

Kuchino Кучино
- Village
- Location within Vologda Oblast Location within Russia
- Coordinates: 59°11′N 39°27′E
- Country: Russia
- Region: Vologda Oblast
- District: Vologodsky District
- Time zone: UTC+3:00

Kuchino (Russian: Кучино) is a rural locality (a village) in Staroselskoye Rural Settlement, Vologodsky District, Vologda Oblast, Russia. The population was 12 as of 2002.

== Geography ==
Kuchino is located 31 km west of Vologda (the district's administrative centre) by road. Sareyka is the nearest rural locality.
