= Jiefang Subdistrict, Zhoushan =

Subdistrict of Zhoushan, Zhejiang, China

Coordinates: 30.0173°N 122.0963°E

Jiefang (解放街道) was a sub-district in Dinghai District, the centre of Zhoushan Island (Downtown Zhoushan City), the People's Republic of China. It was dissolved in 2013 and merged into Huannan and Changguo subdistricts.
