= 8th National Congress of the Chinese Communist Party =

Congress of the Chinese Communist Party (1956)

8th National Congress of the Chinese Communist Party 中国共产党第八次全国代表大会
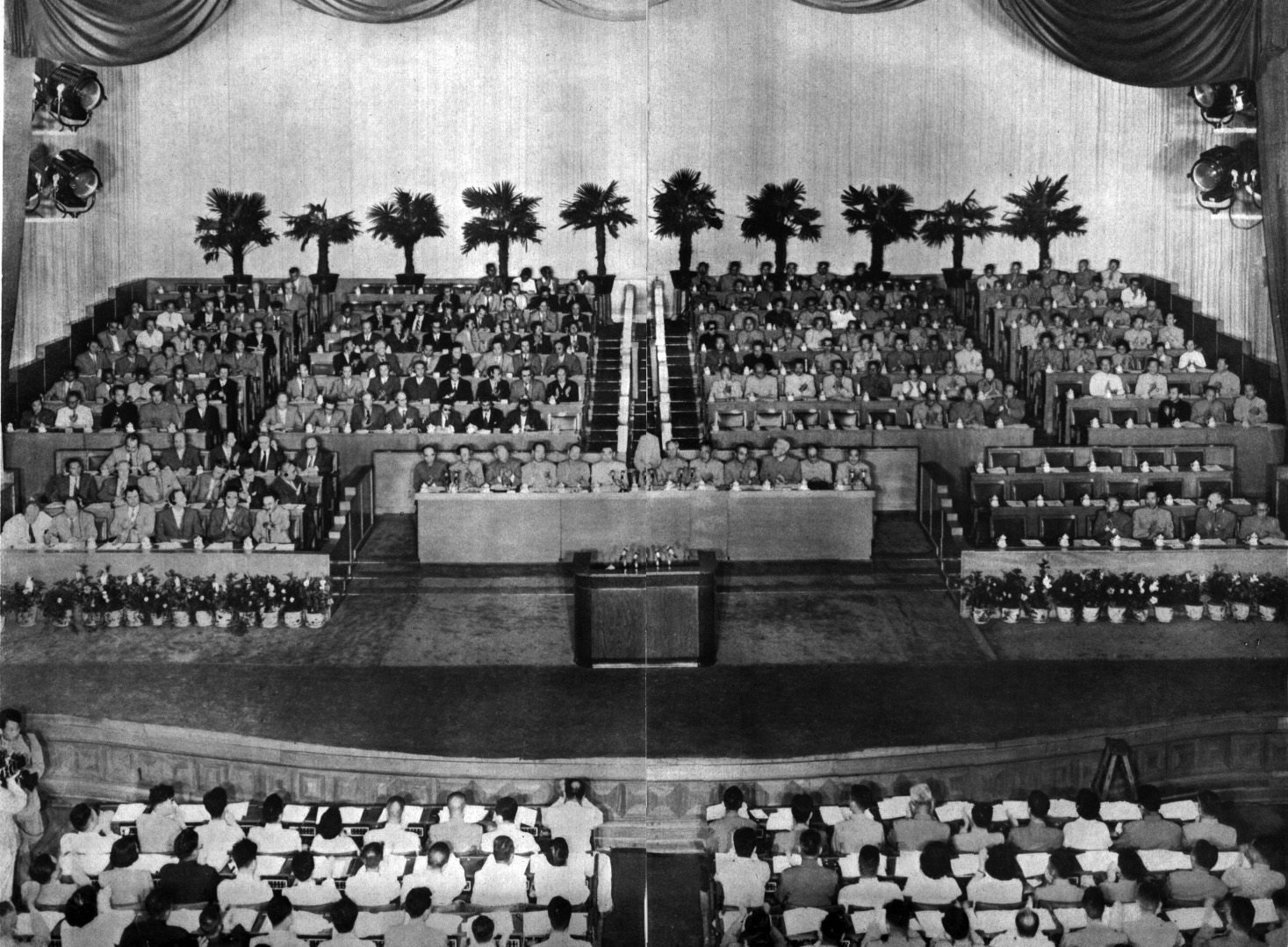
- Mao Zedong delivering a speech at the first session in 1956
- Dates: 15–27 September 1956 (12 days, first session); 5–23 May 1958 (18 days, second session)
- Locations: Auditorium of the National Political Consultative Hall, Beijing, China
- Previous event: 7th National Congress of the Chinese Communist Party (1945)
- Next event: 9th National Congress of the Chinese Communist Party (1969)
- Participants: 1,026 delegates
- Major events: Election of the 8th Central Committee
- Leader: Mao Zedong (Leader of the Chinese Communist Party)

8th National Congress of the Chinese Communist Party
- Traditional Chinese: 中國共產黨第八次全國代表大會
- Simplified Chinese: 中国共产党第八次全国代表大会
Transcriptions
Standard Mandarin
- Hanyu Pinyin: Zhōngguó Gòngchǎndǎng Dìbācì Quánguó Dàibiǎo Dàhuì

Abbreviated name
- Chinese: 八大
Transcriptions
Standard Mandarin
- Hanyu Pinyin: Bā-dà

The 8th National Congress of the Chinese Communist Party was held in two sessions, the first 15–27 September 1956 and the second 5–23 May 1958 in Beijing. It was the first Congress of the Chinese Communist Party since the start of it taking full control of mainland China in 1949 and establishing the People's Republic of China. It was preceded by the relatively early 7th National Congress and was formally succeeded by the 9th National Congress. 1,026 delegates and 86 alternate delegates represented the party's 10.73 million members.

The Great Hall of the People was not yet constructed, so it was held in the National Political Consultative Hall.

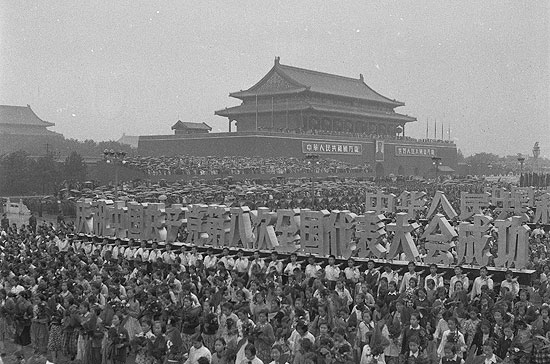
A National Day parade in Beijing on October 1, 1956, celebrating the 8th National Congress.

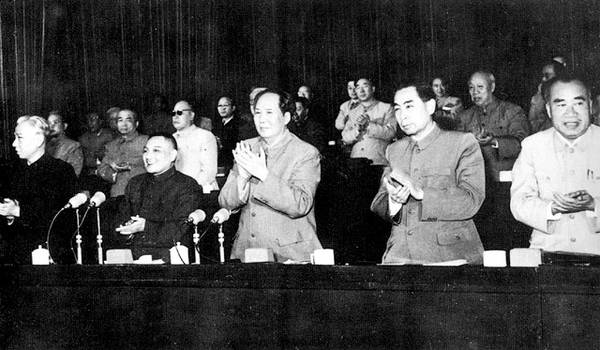
The rostrum of the Second Session of the 8th National Party Congress. From left: Liu Shaoqi, Deng Xiaoping, Mao Zedong, Zhou Enlai and Zhu De.

== Legislation ==
The Great Leap Forward was promulgated and unilaterally put in effect.

=== Representatives ===
- Delegates: 1,026
- Alternate delegates: 86
- Represented party members: 10,730,000

=== Significance ===
The 8th National Congress was the first Congress to be held in 11 years, and the first Congress since the establishment of the People's Republic of China. Mao Zedong Thought was taken out of the Constitution of the Chinese Communist Party and the cult of personality was denounced; Party technocrats Liu Shaoqi and Deng Xiaoping assume higher profiles. The 8th Central Committee of the Chinese Communist Party was elected.

The 8th National Congress concluded in 1956 that class struggle should not be taken as the "key link" in a society that had become socialist and that the CPC should focus on modernization. The Resolution on Certain Questions in the History of Our Party since the Founding of the People's Republic of China affirmed in 1981 that this had been the correct line.

== See also ==
- Qualification Review Committee of the 8th National Congress of the Chinese Communist Party
