= Liu Lantao =

Chinese Communist revolutionary and politician

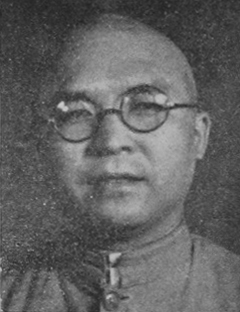
Liu Lantao

Liu Lantao (Chinese: 刘澜涛; 17 November 1910 – 31 December 1997) male, born in Mizhi, Shaanxi Province, was a senior leader of the Chinese Communist Party (CCP) and the People's Republic of China. He was a member of the Standing Committee of the Central Advisory Committee, vice-chairman of the fourth, fifth and sixth Chinese People's Political Consultative Conference National Committee, alternate secretary of the eighth Secretariat of the Central Committee of the Chinese Communist Party, and deputy secretary of the Central Supervision Commission.

== Biography ==
=== Early life ===
Liu was born in Shaanxi Province in 1910. After participating in the May Thirtieth Movement of 1925 at the age of 14, Liu joined the Communist Youth League of China in 1926 and the Chinese Communist Party (CCP) in September 1928 at the age of 17. Liu and fellow communist Liu Zhidan organized a resistance movement to the Kuomintang in northern Shaanxi. In August 1930, Liu was captured and imprisoned. After his release, he went to Hebei Province, where he was betrayed, captured a second time and imprisoned in Beiping alongside An Ziwen and Bo Yibo. In September 1936, he was rescued from prison by the underground organization of the CCP and dispatched to the Suidong area to carry out work against the Empire of Japan. Due to being wanted by the government of the Republic of China, he was transferred to the position of Deputy Secretary of the Tianjin Municipal Committee of the CCP.

=== Sino-Japanese War ===
At the start of the Second Sino-Japanese War, Liu Lantao returned to the Shaan Gan Ning Border Region and successively served as the Deputy Minister of the Propaganda Department of the Shaan Gan Ning Special Zone Party Committee, Secretary of the Suide Special Committee of the CCP, and Minister of United Front Work;In 1938, he was transferred to the Shanxi-Chahar-Hebei border area, and successively served as the secretary of the Party Committee of Beiyue District of Shanxi-Chahar-Hebei, deputy secretary of the Central Committee of the Shanxi-Chahar-Hebei Branch, and deputy political commissar of the Shanxi-Chahar-Hebei Military Region, assisted Peng Zhen and Nie Rongzhen, and participated in leading the construction of anti-Japanese base areas in Shanxi-Chahar-Hebei and the anti-" mopping up "struggle.

=== Chinese Civil War ===
In May 1948, the Central Bureau of Shanxi-Hebei was merged with the Central Bureau of Shanxi, Hebei, Shandong and Henan, and was reorganized into the North China Bureau of the CCP Central Committee. Liu Lantao served as the Standing Committee member of the North China Bureau, the director of the Organization Department and the president of the Party School, and was promoted to the deputy secretary of the North China Bureau, the third secretary of the North China Bureau, the deputy political commissar of the North China Military Region, and the president of the newly established North China People's Revolutionary University.

=== Post-1949 ===
After the establishment of the People's Republic of China, Liu Lantao also served as the Minister of North China Affairs of the Central People's Government, Chairman of the North China Administrative Committee of the Central People's Government, and member of the National Planning Commission of the Central People's Government; In November 1951, Liu Lantao submitted a report on the serious criminal facts of Liu Qingshan and Zhang Zishan to the central government.

In 1954, after the revocation of the Great Administrative Region, Liu Lantao was appointed as the Deputy General Secretary of the Chinese Communist Party, assisting Deng Xiaoping, the General Secretary of the Chinese Communist Party, in his work. In September of that year, he was elected as a member of the Standing Committee of the First National People's Congress and chairman of the Budget Committee.

Amid the Cultural Revolution, Liu Lantao was among those accused of treason as part of the 61 Renegades conspiracy, and was subsequently imprisoned and tortured by Central Case Examination Group (中央专案组) interrogators. Only at his release in 1975 and his banishment to Anqing, Anhui, was he informed that his wife Liu Sufei (刘素菲) had killed herself seven years earlier under the pressure of accusations of spying.

Liu Lantao was only rehabilitated in 1978, when he was named vice-minister of the United Front Work Department. In June 1983, he was re-elected Vice chairman of the Standing Committee of the Sixth Chinese People's Political Consultative Conference National Committee. He died in Beijing on December 31, 1997, at the age of 87.
