= Bo Yibo =

Chinese politician (1908–2007)

- 薄一波
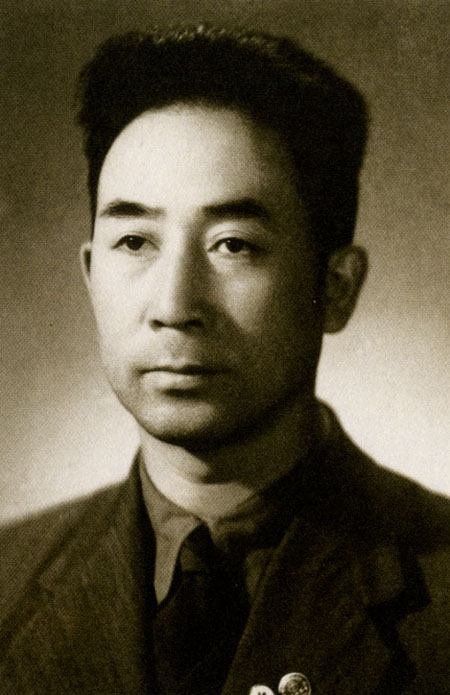
- Bo in c. 1946

Executive Vice Chairman of the Central Advisory Commission
- In office 12 September 1982 – 18 October 1992 Serving with: Xu Shiyou; Tan Zhenlin; Li Weihan; Song Renqiong
- Chairman: Deng Xiaoping; Chen Yun

Director of the National Machinery Industry Commission
- In office February 1980 – May 1982
- Preceded by: New title
- Succeeded by: Zou Jiahua

Vice Premier of China
- In office 16 November 1956 – 16 March 1966
- Premier: Zhou Enlai
- In office 1 July 1979 – 20 June 1983
- Premier: Hua Guofeng; Zhao Ziyang

Director of the National Economic Commission
- In office May 1956 – September 1968
- Preceded by: New title
- Succeeded by: Su Jing

Director of the National Basic Construction Commission
- In office November 1954 – August 1956
- Preceded by: New title
- Succeeded by: Wang Heshou

Director of the National Organization Committee
- In office March 1950 – 1954
- Preceded by: New title
- Succeeded by: Position revoked

1st Minister of Finance
- In office 19 October 1949 – 18 September 1953
- Preceded by: New title
- Succeeded by: Deng Xiaoping

First Secretary of the North China Bureau of the Central Committee of the Chinese Communist Party
- In office 1949–1954
- Preceded by: Liu Shaoqi
- Succeeded by: Li Xuefeng

Personal details
- Born: Bo Shucun (薄書存); 6 February 1908 Dingxiang County, Shanxi, Qing Empire
- Died: 15 January 2007 (aged 98) Beijing, China
- Party: Chinese Communist Party
- Spouse: Hu Ming (胡明)
- Relations: Bo family
- Children: 7, including Xilai
- Education: Central Party School of the Chinese Communist Party

Chinese name
- Chinese: 薄一波
Transcriptions
Standard Mandarin
- Hanyu Pinyin: Bó Yībō

Bo Shucun
- Simplified Chinese: 薄书存
- Traditional Chinese: 薄書存
Transcriptions
Standard Mandarin
- Hanyu Pinyin: BóShūcún

Bo Yibo (Chinese: 薄一波; pinyin: Bó Yībō; Wade–Giles: Po^{2} I^{1}-po^{1}; 6 February 1908 – 15 January 2007) was one of the most senior political figures in China during the 1980s and 1990s.

After joining the Chinese Communist Party (CCP) when he was 17, he worked as a CCP organizer in Taiyuan, around his native city of Dingxiang, Shanxi. He was promoted to organize CCP guerrilla movements in northern China from a headquarters in Tianjin in 1928, but he was arrested and imprisoned by Kuomintang police in 1931. In 1936, with the tacit support of the CCP, Bo signed an anti-communist confession to secure his release. After his release Bo returned to Shanxi, rejoined the communists, and fought both the Kuomintang and the Japanese Empire in northern China until the CCP completed their unification of mainland China in 1949.

During Bo's career he held successive posts as Communist China's inaugural Minister of Finance, a member of the CCP Politburo, Vice-Premier, chairman of State Economic Commission, and vice-chairman of the party's Central Advisory Commission. Bo was purged in 1966 by the Mao-backed Gang of Four, but he was brought back to power by Deng Xiaoping in the late 1970s, after Mao's death.

Bo was one of a select group of powerful veterans centred on Deng who were informally known as the "Eight Immortals" for their political longevity and for the vast influence they commanded during the 1980s and 1990s. After returning to power Bo supported economic liberalization, but was a moderate conservative politically. He supported both Hu Yaobang's dismissal in 1987 and the use of violence against protesters in 1989. Bo's political involvement declined in the 1993, but he used his influence to support both Deng Xiaoping and Jiang Zemin, and to promote the career of his son, Bo Xilai. He was the last remaining, and longest-lived, of the Eight Elders at the time of his death on 15 January 2007, just a little over a month short of his 99th birthday.

== Biography ==
=== Early life ===
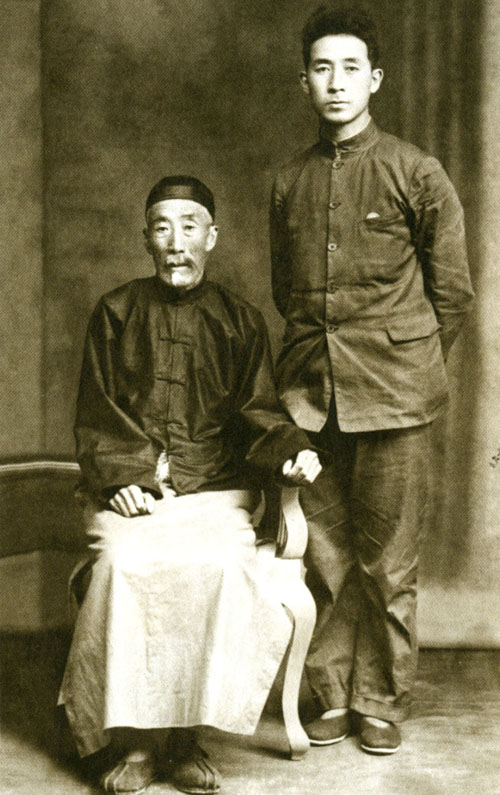
Bo Yibo and his father

Bo Yibo was born in Taiyuan, the capital of Shanxi, which had become one of the poorest provinces in China by the early 20th century. His father was a craftsman who produced paper, but the family was so poor that they were forced to drown one of Bo's newborn brothers because they were not wealthy enough to feed him. As a student, Bo was politically active, and once organized a protest against local land taxes. After graduating from high school in Taiyuan he attended Beijing University. While studying in Beijing he joined the Chinese Communist Party, four years after it was founded, in 1925.

Between 1925 and 1928 Bo held a number of minor, local positions as a Communist Party organizer in his home city of Taiyuan. After Chiang Kai-shek's Kuomintang (KMT) began to violently suppress communists across China in 1927, Bo went into hiding and continued to organize Communist activities in rural areas. In 1928 Bo was sent by the Party to work underground as a Party organizer in Tianjin. He was arrested by the KMT three times; and, after the last time, in 1931, he spent several years in jail. While imprisoned in a correctional facility for military personnel in Beijing, Bo held a formal Party title and was responsible for spreading communism and organizing communist activities in the prison.

In late 1936 the Kuomintang warlord governing Bo's home province of Shanxi, Yan Xishan, began to fear that the Japanese Empire was planning to invade China and formed a "united front" with the Communists to resist the Japanese in Shanxi. Yan then began attracting Shanxi natives across China to return and work for his government in various patriotic organizations. Yan arranged for Guo Yingyi, one of Bo's former classmates and a former Communist then working for Yan, to travel to Beijing and secure Bo's cooperation. Guo succeeded in persuading Bo to sign an anti-Communist confession to secure his release (with the tacit support of the Communist Party) and Bo returned to Shanxi to work with Yan Xishan in October 1936.

After returning to Shanxi, Yan placed Bo in charge of his "Patriotic Sacrifice League", a local organization dedicated to organizing local resistance against Japanese invasion (which Bo organized as a front for promoting Communism). While working under Yan, Bo organized a "dare-to-die" corps of young volunteers and used his good relationship with Yan to persuade Yan to release communists that he was holding in prison. After the Japanese succeeded in taking northern Shanxi in 1937 and wiping out 90% of Yan's military forces, Bo collected the survivors of his unit and conducted anti-Japanese guerrilla operations in southern Shanxi. When cooperation between Yan and the Communists ended in 1939, Bo led the survivors of his unit that were loyal to him and joined the Communist Eighth Route Army. Bo worked until the Japanese surrendered, in 1945, as a commander and political commissar in the People's Liberation Army, fighting the Japanese in Shanxi, Hebei, Shandong, and Henan. He held a number of positions within the Party that recognized his administrative authority over much of these areas, and his prestige and influence grew throughout the period of the war. During the later stages of Chinese Civil War, from 1946 to 1949, Bo worked closely under Liu Shaoqi and General Nie Rongzhen.

=== People's Republic of China ===
After the Communists won the civil war in 1949, Bo worked as China's finance minister and chairman of the State Planning Commission. In 1956, the State Economic Commission was established under Bo in order to ease administrative burdens on the State Planning Commission. Bo served in a number of other similar positions, including vice premier (from 1957) under Zhou Enlai.

During the early 1950s he was Mao's swimming partner.

In July 1958, Bo, Chen Yun, and Nie Rongzhen were assigned to a "three persons" group to oversee nuclear weapons development.

He promoted moderate economic policies until he lost Mao's favour in 1958.

In 1964, Bo and Li Fuchun traveled to southwest China to relay Mao's selection of Panzhihua as the base for steel industry development during China's Third Front construction.

Bo Yibo was a member of the CCP Politburo from the 8th National Party Congress in 1956 to the beginning of the Cultural Revolution, and again during the leadership of Deng Xiaoping, from 1979 until the 12th National Party Congress in 1982, when most of the elders retired from formal government positions.

=== Persecution in the Cultural Revolution ===
When the Cultural Revolution began in 1966, Bo was quickly identified as a "capitalist roader" and purged as one of the "61 Renegades"—Party members who had spent time in Kuomintang prisons. Jiang Qing produced the anti-communist statement that Bo had signed in 1937 with the Kuomintang in order to secure his release from prison, accusing him of "betraying the party" and making him an easy target for persecution. On 9 February 1967, Kang Sheng and his associates organized a rally in the Beijing Workers Stadium to criticize and "struggle against" Bo. Bo was paraded through the stadium with an iron plaque around his neck describing his "crimes", but he was more defiant than most victims persecuted by Red Guards, and demanded (unsuccessfully) to speak in his own defence. While being paraded he shouted: "I am not a traitor! I am a member of the Communist Party!" Bo's insistence that he was a loyal Communist Party member and that Mao had approved all of his actions created a chaotic atmosphere, and the rally was cancelled after three minutes.

After the rally Bo was transferred to a Beijing prison, where he was charged and convicted of many crimes, including being "a backbone general of the Liu-Deng Black Headquarters", "a core element of the Liu Shaoqi renegade clique", "a big traitor", "a counter-revolutionary revisionist element", and "a Three Anti element". His captors claimed that many of these crimes should be punished by death. Because of Bo's stubborn refusal to break down and "confess" to these charges, he was subjected to various means of torture throughout 1966 and 1967, during which he was routinely beaten and systematically deprived of food, water and sleep.

While imprisoned, Bo attempted to keep notes on the circumstances of his beatings by writing on scraps of newspaper, but his jailers confiscated these and used them as evidence of Bo's recalcitrance. Eventually, his hands trembled so much that he could not hold chopsticks, and he had to scrape his rice off the floor of his cell. When he complained to his jailers that this was "not the communist way", his jailers only beat him more severely. Bo's children were jailed or sent to the countryside, and his wife died in captivity (she was reportedly beaten to death by Red Guards, but they claimed that she committed suicide). Bo Xiyong, Bo Xilai, and Bo Xicheng were imprisoned at the ages of sixteen, seventeen and seventeen (respectively), and Bo Xining was sent to the countryside at the age of fourteen. Bo remained in prison for over a decade.

=== Career under Deng Xiaoping ===
Three years after Mao died, in 1979, Deng Xiaoping led an effort to rehabilitate members of the Communist Party who had been persecuted during the Cultural Revolution, and Bo was released from prison and reinstated as a member of the Politburo, and to his former position of vice premier. He joined the ranks of a small group of other senior officials of Deng's generation who Deng had returned to government known as the "Eight Immortals". In 1982 he was promoted to the Central Advisory Commission, a formal group of Party elders with over forty years of political experience. During the 1980s the group clashed with a group of younger reformers within the Party led by Hu Yaobang.

Bo came to support economic reform after one of his trips in the 1980s to Boeing's facilities in the United States. During his visit, Bo discovered that there were only two airplanes parked at the facility. He asked the Boeing executives whether there would be any planes left if the two that he saw were gone. The company's executives answered that two was the exact number they wanted at this particular time, because their production was based on customer orders and anything more than necessary would be a waste of resources. After this visit to Boeing, Bo became much more critical of the Chinese practice of a planned economy, pointing out that excesses of production were in fact a waste of resources. Even for a planned economy, Bo believed that central planning should be based on market demand instead of on rigid Soviet-style planning undertaken without regard to market forces.

Bo was an important supporter of economic reform in the early 1980s, but eventually supported the efforts of other, more conservative, party elders to remove Hu from power in 1987. During the Tiananmen Square protests of 1989 Bo was one of the Party hardliners who believed that the students were secretly being controlled by "imperialists with ulterior motives". He strongly supported the decision and personally persuaded Deng who was the head of military to use force to suppress the demonstrations.

After 1989 Bo intervened numerous times to support Deng's efforts to restart economic (but not political) liberalization, and to prevent economic hardliners from dominating Party politics. Even after completely retiring during the 1990s, his status meant that he remained an influential figure who still pulled strings behind the scenes and could make or unmake party officials. He used his influence to support the rise of Jiang Zemin, who became the General Secretary of the Chinese Communist Party in the 1989. Bo Yibo retired from politics after the Central Advisory Committee was abolished in October 1992 after the 14th Party Congress. In 1993 he co-authored a book on the early history of the Chinese Communist Party.

Bo closely supported the political career of his son, Bo Xilai, who was considered a member of the "Crown Prince Party," though its members are only loosely affiliated by their background. Bo Xilai eventually rose to become China's commerce minister; and, later, the Communist Party Committee Secretary of Chongqing, but his political career ended with the 2012 Wang Lijun scandal.

=== Death ===
Bo lived long enough to be the oldest member of the CCP by the end of his life. He died of an undisclosed illness on 15 January 2007. He was cremated and his remains were interred at Babaoshan Revolutionary Cemetery next to his wife Hu Ming. His daughter, who died twelve years later, was buried next to them.

== Bibliography ==
- "Biography of Bo Yibo". China Daily. 17 January 2007. Retrieved 28 May 2012.
- Feng Chongyi and Goodman, David S. G., eds. North China at War: The Social Ecology of Revolution, 1937–1945. Lanham, Maryland: Rowman and Littlefield. 2000. ISBN 0-8476-9938-2. Retrieved 3 June 2012.
- "Bo Yibo, Chinese Revolutionary, Dies at 98" Financial Times. 17 January 2007. Retrieved 28 May 2012.
- Gillin, Donald G. Warlord: Yen Hsi-shan in Shansi Province 1911–1949. Princeton, New Jersey: Princeton University Press. 1967.
- Gittings, John. "Bo Yibo: Veteran Chinese Leader and 'Immortal' whose Loyalty to the Party Survived its Purges". The Guardian. 24 January 2007. Retrieved 27 May 2012.
- Kahn, Joseph. "Bo Yibo, Leader Who Helped Reshape China's Economy, Dies". New York Times. 16 January 2007. Retrieved 28 May 2012.
- Wortzel, Larry M. Dictionary of Contemporary Chinese Military History. Westport, CT: Greenwood. 1999. ISBN 978-0313293375. Retrieved 29 May 2012.
- Wu, Nan (23 September 2013). "Babaoshan struggles to meet demand as cadres' final resting place". South China Morning Post.
- Wu Linquan and Peng Fei. "Bo Yibo Has an Attitude Problem". In China's Cultural Revolution, 1966–1969: Not A Dinner Party. Ed. Michael Schoenhals. Armonk, New York: East Gate. 1996. ISBN 1-56324-736-4. pp. 122–135. Retrieved 28 May 2012.

Party political offices
Preceded by Liu Shaoqi	First Secretary of the North China Bureau of the Central Committee of the Chinese Communist Party; 1949–1954	Succeeded by Li Xuefeng
New title	Executive Vice Chairman of the Central Advisory Commission; 1982–1992	Succeeded by Position revoked
Government offices
New title	Minister of Finance; 1949–1952	Succeeded by Rong Zihe
New title	Director of the National Organization Committee; 1950–1954	Succeeded by Position revoked
New title	Director of the National Basic Construction Commission; 1954–1956	Succeeded by Wang Heshou
New title	Director of the National Economic Commission; 1956–1968	Succeeded by Su Jing
New title	Director of the National Machinery Industry Commission; 1980–1982	Succeeded by Zou Jiahua
