= Zhang Jun (Song chancellor) =

Chinese chancellor and general of the Song dynasty

Zhang Jun (traditional Chinese: 張浚; simplified Chinese: 张浚; pinyin: Zhāng Jùn, 1097 – 16 September 1164), courtesy name Deyuan, was a Chinese chancellor between 1135 and 1137, military commissioner, and general of the Southern Song dynasty. A native of Mianzhu, Sichuan, he is also known by the pseudonym "Zǐyán Jūshì" (紫巖居士).

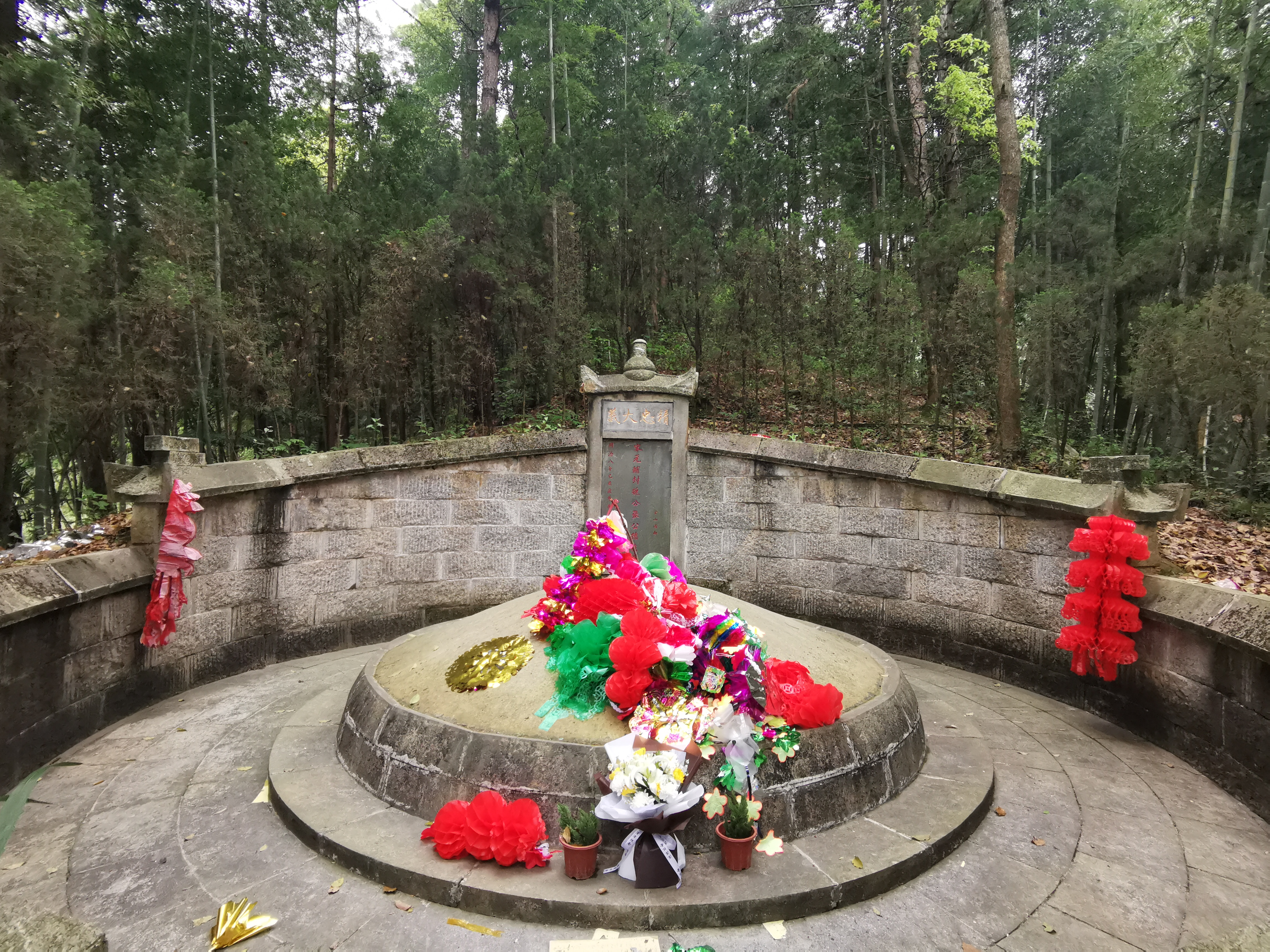
Tomb of Zhang Jun

Zhang rose to hold various important civil and military posts, and was successful on several occasions in checking the incursions of the Jurchen Jin dynasty in the Jin–Song Wars, notably in 1118 and 1126. He was for war and extermination, and would hear of no compromise with these enemies of his country. In reference to his mission of defence of Shaanxi and Sichuan, Zhao Ding (趙鼎) said of him that Zhang had "repaired the heavens and cleansed the sun." He was appointed chancellor during the reign of Emperor Gaozong in 1135, a position he shared with Zhao Ding. In 1137 he fell victim to the intrigues of Qin Hui, whose conciliatory policy he steadily opposed, and was sent to Yongzhou in Hunan. He was then recalled under the reign of Emperor Xiaozong, successor of Gaozong. He was ennobled as Duke. Xiaozong was supportive of Zhang's hawkish stance towards to the Jurchens. In the court of Xiaozong, his political rival was Shi Hao, his former tutor and an opponent of further wars against the Jin. Afterwards he rose to the rank of Prince. He was well read, especially in the Classic of Changes, on which he wrote a commentary. Zhang was given the posthumous name Zhōngxiàn (忠献).

== See also ==
- Emperor Gaozong of Song
- Yue Fei
- Han Shizhong
- Han Tuozhou
- Qin Hui
- Zhang Jun (general)
- Timeline of the Jin–Song wars

== Bibliography ==
- Gong, Wei Ai (2009). "The Reign of Hsiao-tsung (1162-1189)". In Paul Jakov Smith; Denis C. Twitchett (eds.). The Cambridge History of China: Volume 5, The Sung Dynasty and Its Precursors, 907-1279. Cambridge University Press. pp. 710–755. ISBN 978-0-521-81248-1. (hardcover)
- Tao, Jing-Shen (2009). "The Move to the South and the Reign of Kao-tsung". In Paul Jakov Smith; Denis C. Twitchett (eds.). The Cambridge History of China: Volume 5, The Sung Dynasty and Its Precursors, 907-1279. Cambridge University Press. pp. 556–643. ISBN 978-0-521-81248-1. (hardcover)
