= Zhang Jun (general) =

Chinese military general and politician (1086-1154)

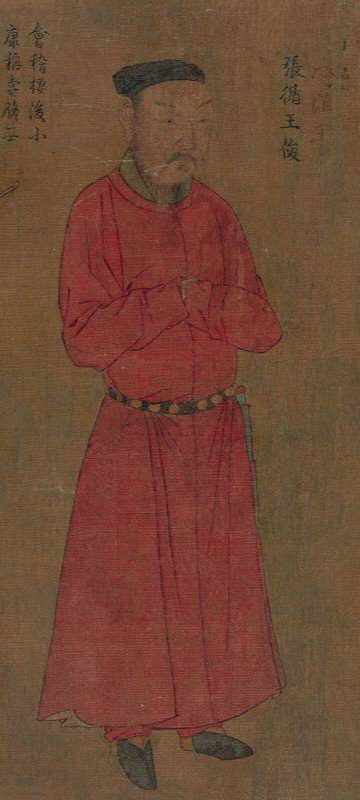
Portrait of Zhang Jun in The "Four Generals of the Restoration" painted by Liu Songnian during the Southern Song Dynasty.

Zhang Jun (traditional Chinese: 張俊; simplified Chinese: 张俊; pinyin: Zhāng Jùn, 1086 – 12 August 1154), courtesy name Boying (伯英), was a Chinese military general and politician who fought during the Jin–Song wars. His battle with Jurchen commander Wuzhu at Mingzhou near the temporary Song capital of Hangzhou briefly halted the Jin advance, giving the Song Emperor Gaozong the chance to flee the city by ship. Soon after, his army suppressed rebellions and banditry in the south alongside the generals Yue Fei, Han Shizhong, Yang Qizhong, and others. Emperor Gaozong diminished the power of the military by moving Yue, Han, and Zhang to civilian positions in 1141. A year later, the Song finished negotiating a peace treaty with the Jin.

Zhang was probably the wealthiest man during the reign of Emperor Gaozong. A large portion of his personal wealth consists of rice fields bestowed on him by the emperor.

== See also ==
- Yue Fei
- Qin Hui
- Jin–Song Wars
- Timeline of the Jin–Song wars

== Bibliography ==
- Tao, Jing-Shen (2009). "The Move to the South and the Reign of Kao-tsung". In Paul Jakov Smith; Denis C. Twitchett (eds.). The Cambridge History of China: Volume 5, The Sung Dynasty and Its Precursors, 907-1279. Cambridge University Press. pp. 556–643. ISBN 978-0-521-81248-1. (hardcover)
