= Qin Hui =

Song dynasty politician (1091–1155)

Grand Preceptor Senior Pillar of State Qin Hui
- 秦檜
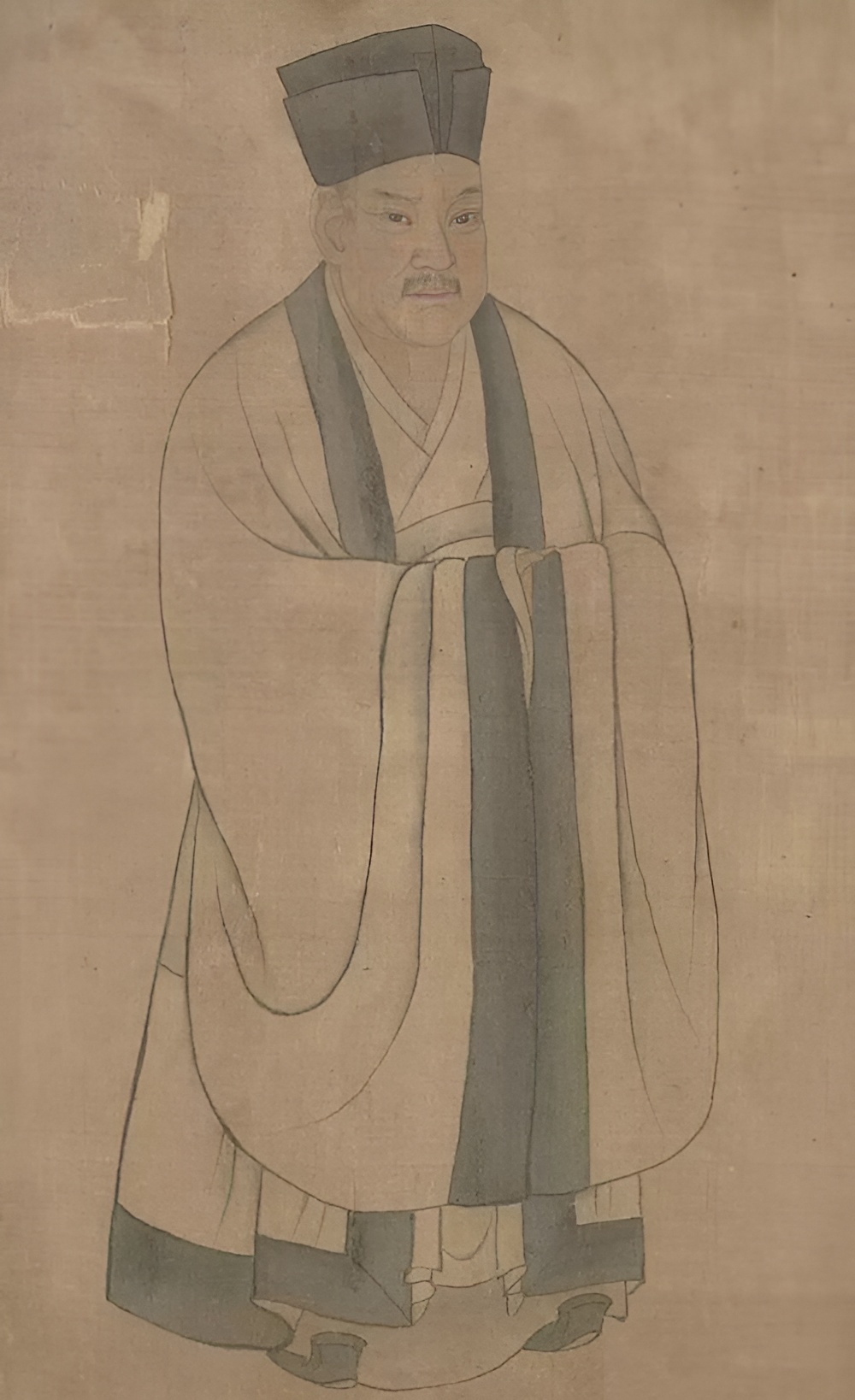
- Portrait of Qin Kuai

Joint Chancellor of the Central Secretariat and the Chancellery (同中書門下平章事)
- In office 1138–1155
- In office 1131–1132

Left Supervisor of the Department of State Affairs (尚書左僕射)
- In office 1141–1155

Right Supervisor of the Department of State Affairs (尚書右僕射)
- In office 1138–1141
- In office 1131–1132

Minister of Rites
- In office 1130–1131

Personal details
- Born: January 17, 1091 Jiangning Prefecture, Northern Song dynasty
- Died: November 18, 1155 (aged 64) Lin'an Prefecture, Southern Song dynasty
- Spouse: Lady Wang
- Nickname: Long-legged Qin

Chinese name
- Traditional Chinese: 秦檜
- Simplified Chinese: 秦桧
Transcriptions
Standard Mandarin
- Hanyu Pinyin: Qín Huì or Qín Kuài
- Wade–Giles: Ch'in^{2} Hui^{4} or Ch'in^{2} K'uai^{1}
- IPA: [tɕʰǐn xwêɪ] or [tɕʰǐn kʰwâɪ]
Yue: Cantonese
- Jyutping: ceon^{4} kui^{2}

Courtesy name
- Traditional Chinese: 會之
- Simplified Chinese: 会之
Transcriptions
Standard Mandarin
- Hanyu Pinyin: Huìzhī
- Wade–Giles: Hui^{4}-chih^{1}
Yue: Cantonese
- Jyutping: wui^{6} zi^{1}

Qin Hui (Note: Pronunciation in Mainland China) or Qin Kuai (Note: Pronunciation in Taiwan) (Chinese: 秦檜; 17 January 1091 – 18 November 1155), courtesy name Huizhi (會之), was a Chinese politician of the early Southern Song dynasty, holding a position of chancellor under Emperor Gaozong.

Qin Hui was a contemporary of Yue Fei, a national heroic person and general who fought for the Song against the Jin dynasty during the Jin–Song Wars, and whom he considered a political enemy. Modern Chinese historians consider Qin to be a traitor for his part in the persecution and execution of Yue.

He was also nicknamed "Long-legged Qin" (Chinese: 秦長腿).

== Life ==
Born in Jiangning Prefecture (present days Nanjing, Jiangsu), Qin won Jinshi in the Imperial examination of 1115. During the Northern Song dynasty, Qin was an activist against the invasion by the Jin dynasty in the Jin–Song Wars. He was captured along with Emperor Qinzong and Emperor Huizong in the Jingkang Incident.

Some years later, he suddenly returned from captivity in the Jin empire to the capital of Emperor Gaozong. He claimed some sort of miraculous escape but quite a number of people expressed doubt regarding his story. However, he quickly won the emperor's favor and became the Chancellor of the Southern Song empire in 1131. In the next year, he was removed from the position after impeachment. After some Song victories in 1137, the Jin empire was forced to reopen peace talks, and Qin gained power as a pacifist.

With Qin's help, the emperor suppressed the war hawks and signed the Treaty of Shaoxing with the Jin empire. The emperor basically accepted the status of being a vassal of the Jin empire publicly. To open the peace talks, the national hero general Yue Fei, who was famous for his military successes against the Jurchen people, was framed by Qin and his accomplices for disobedience and treason. Yue was soon removed from his position, arrested and executed in prison. Murdering Yue Fei is one of the most infamous acts by a government minister in the whole history of the Song dynasty. Qin became notorious, and (after he lost power and died) some people suspected that he was a traitor.

Qin Hui removed all his political opponents from the government by use of his control over the Imperial Censorate. Most of his enemies were exiled far to the south, and in fact several died on Hainan Island. He believed that schools should only teach "acceptable ideas" and practiced a strong form of censorship and thought control over the Imperial University.

After Emperor Gaozong's abdication, the new Emperor Xiaozong of Song pardoned most of Qin's political enemies, including a posthumous pardon for Yue Fei. From that point on, Qin was constantly vilified by Chinese historians. He became one of the most important examples in Chinese history of a corrupt minister.

== Story of Qin Hui and Yue Fei ==
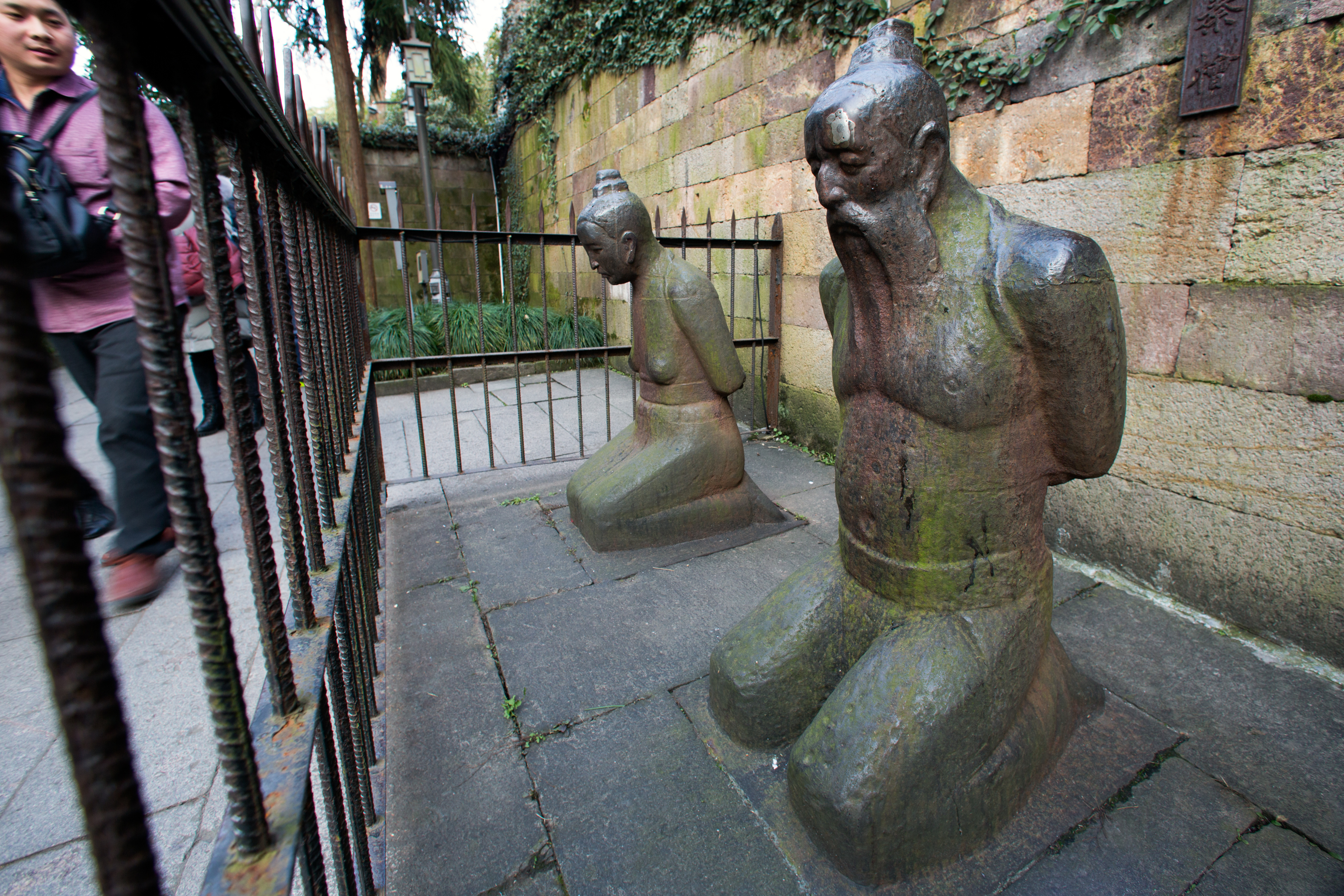
Statues of Qin Hui and Lady Wang at the Yue Fei Temple.

The Qing dynasty novel The Story of Yue Fei states that after having Yue Fei, Yue Yun, and Zhang Xian arrested on false charges, Qin and his wife, Lady Wang (Chinese: 王氏), were sitting by the "eastern window", warming themselves by the fire, when he received a letter from the people calling for the release of the general. Qin was worried because, after nearly two months of torture, he could not get Yue Fei to admit the false charges of treason and would eventually have to let him go. However, after a servant girl brought fresh oranges into the room, Lady Wang devised a plan to execute the general. She told Qin to slip an execution notice inside the skin of an orange and send it to the examining judge. This way, the general and his companions would be put to death before the Emperor or Qin himself would have to rescind an open order of execution. This conspiracy became known as the “East-Window Plot”. An anonymous novel was written about this called the Dong Chuang Ji ("Tale of the Eastern Window") during the Ming dynasty.

When asked by General Han Shizhong what crime Yue had committed, Qin Hui replied, "Though it isn't sure whether there is something that he did to betray the dynasty, maybe there is.” The phrase "maybe there is" (simplified Chinese: 莫须有; traditional Chinese: 莫須有; pinyin: mò xū yǒu) has entered the Chinese language as an expression to refer to fabricated charges.

For their part in Yue Fei's death, topless iron statues of Qin Hui, Lady Wang, and two of Qin Hui's subordinates, Moqi Xie and Zhang Jun (Chinese: 張俊), were made to kneel before Yue Fei's tomb (located by Hangzhou's West Lake). For centuries, these statues have been cursed, spat and urinated upon by young and old. But now, in modern times, these statues are protected as historical relics. The statues have been recast several times, most recently in 1979 after disappearing in the 1960s. There is a poem hanging on the gate surrounding the statues, it reads:

"The green hill is fortunate to be the burial ground of a loyal general, the white iron was innocent to be cast into the statues of traitors."

The story of Qin and his wife are also said to be the origin of Youtiao.

== Folktales ==
=== Xiyoubu ===
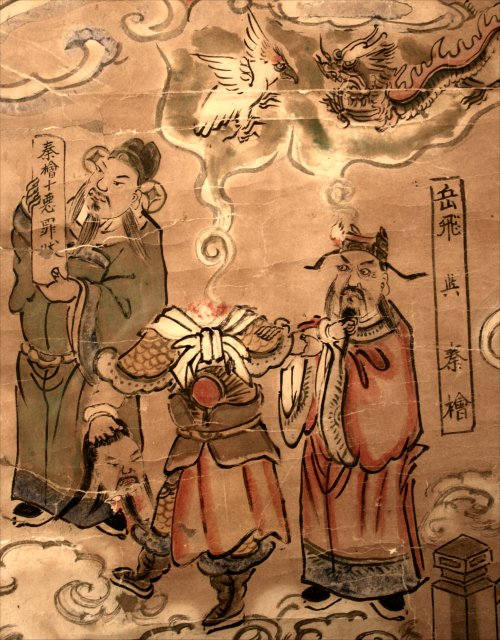
The headless ghost of Yue Fei confronting the recently deceased spirit of Qin Hui in the Sixth Court. The plaque held by the attendant on the left reads: "Qin Hui's ten wicked crimes." From a 19th-century Chinese Hell Scroll.

Xiyoubu (西遊補 - "Supplement to the Journey to the West", 1640) - A Ming dynasty addendum to the famous Chinese novel Journey to the West, which takes place between the end of chapter 61 and the beginning of 62. In the novel, The Monkey King faces a representation of his own carnal desires and is trapped inside of a tower full of mirrors, each with its own powers. One mirror causes him to travel forward in time, from the Tang to the Song dynasty. There, some junior devils appear and tell him that the ruler of the underworld King Yama has recently died of an illness, and so Monkey must take his place until a suitable replacement can be found. Monkey ends up judging the fate of the recently deceased Prime Minister Qin Hui. He tortures Qin into confessing his sins. These tortures include having millions of embroidery needles shoved into his flesh, being ground into paste, thrown onto a mountain of swords and spears, hacked into bits, forced to drink human pus, and his rib cage ripped apart to give him the appearance of a dragonfly. A demon is charged with using his magic breath to "blow" Qin back into his proper form. Monkey finally sends a demon to heaven to retrieve a powerful magic gourd that sucks anyone who speaks before it inside and melts them down into a bloody stew. He uses this gourd for Qin's final punishment. Meanwhile, Monkey invites the ghost of Yue Fei to the underworld and takes him as his third master. He claims this completes his lessons on the three religions since: 1) the immortal Subhodi taught him Taoist magic 2) the monk Tang Sanzang taught him Buddhist restraint and 3) Yue Fei taught him Confucian ideals. He entertains Yue Fei until Qin has been reduced to liquid and offers the general a cup of Qin's "blood wine." Yue, however, refuses on the grounds that drinking it would sully his soul. Monkey then does an experiment where he makes a junior devil drink the wine. Sometime later, the devil, apparently under the evil influence of the blood wine, murders his personal religious teacher and escapes into the "gate of ghosts," presumably being reborn into another existence. Yue Fei then takes his leave to return to his heavenly abode. Monkey sends him off with a huge display of respect by making all of the millions of denizens of the underworld kowtow before him.

=== Qin Hui the Stinker ===
The following is a folktale about one of Qin's descendants:

During the Ming dynasty, the new Provincial Governor-General of Hangzhou, who was a direct descendant of Qin and Madam Wang, had both iron statues thrown into the West Lake under cover of night. The next day, the lake turned pitch-black and smelt of vomit. The townsfolk realized that the lake’s condition coincided with the statues' disappearance. When Official Qin arrived on the scene, the people questioned him about his relationship with Qin. Because he knew the statues had sunk to the bottom of the lake, he boasted, "If anyone can really scoop the statues out of the lake, this official is waiting to resign and ask for punishment." At that exact moment, the murky water became clear, and the statues drifted ashore as if propelled by an invisible force. The cowardly official bolted for his sedan when he saw this miraculous sight. The townsfolk pelted his sedan with rocks as he fled, many of them ripping through the curtain, giving him huge lumps on his head. That night, Official Qin escaped Hangzhou, never to be heard from again.

=== The mad monk sweeps Qin out of the temple ===
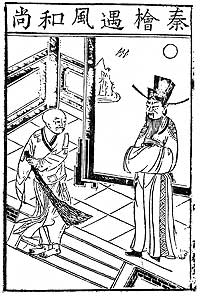
'Qin Hui encounters the Monk of the Wind' from the Tale of the Eastern Window novel.

During the Southern Song dynasty there were two famous Buddhists named the "Crazy monk" Ji Gong and the "Mad Monk" Fengbo. Fengbo lived during the time of Yue Fei and became famous for "Sweeping Qin Hui’s face with a broom". The story is told after having Yue Fei imprisoned on false charges, Qin went to the Lingyin Temple to have his fortune read. There he was confronted by a laughing Feng Bo who asked, "Cao Cao was once a big hero, but where is he today?" The Prime Minister asked him what he meant in confusion. Fengbo said,

"The principles of heaven are clear. Loyalty and treachery are self-evident. Goodness and evil will be met by reward or retribution. You, as the Prime Minister, hold a lot of power. Why do you want to murder a man who is as important to the country as a pillar of a house? Does the safety of the nation mean nothing to you?"

Qin countered, "Who is that pillar of the country?" "General Yue Fei!" screamed Fengbo. When Qin seemed unaffected by his words, Fengbo laughed and said, "What a fool! Repent now before it is too late." He then grabbed a broom and raked it across the Prime Minister’s face and quickly ran off. Feeling embarrassed, Qin returned to the palace a defeated man.

The boldness of the monk caught the attention of the common folk. It is said he would appear in crowded areas and begin to sweep the floor, even in the cleanest of places, and proclaim "sweeping Qin" as a reminder to the people that they should band together to eliminate the traitor Qin from office. The "Mad Monk" was later raised to the level of Arahat.

The statues of the "Mad and Crazy Monks" were often seen together in various temples throughout the Southern Song dynasty. There are two such statues of these arahats in the Da Xiong Temple Hall of Zhan Tan Forest on the Jiu Hua Mountain. One of them is the "Crazy Monk" Ji Gong in the form of a deity and the other is the "Mad Monk" Fengbo holding a duster in one hand and a broom under his left armpit, standing ever ready to give the wicked Prime Minister another sweep.

This is a derivative of an episode from The Story of Yue Fei, which mentions no "sweeping" at all. The fortuneteller's name was "Xie Renfu of Chengdu" and he told the fortunes of both Emperor Gaozong and Qin Hui, who were in disguise, in the Dragon's Intonation Monastery. When Qin returned to the palace, he sent men to arrest the fortuneteller, but he had already fled the city, out of fear once he discovered who they really were.

== See also ==
- Zhang Jun (Song chancellor)
- Yue Fei
- Zhou Tong (archer)
- Youtiao

== Footnotes and references ==
=== References ===
- History of Song Volume 473, Biography of Qin Hui.
- History of Song Volume 365, Biography of Yue Fei.
