= Ji Xiaolan Residence =

Coordinates: 39.8898°N 116.3872°E

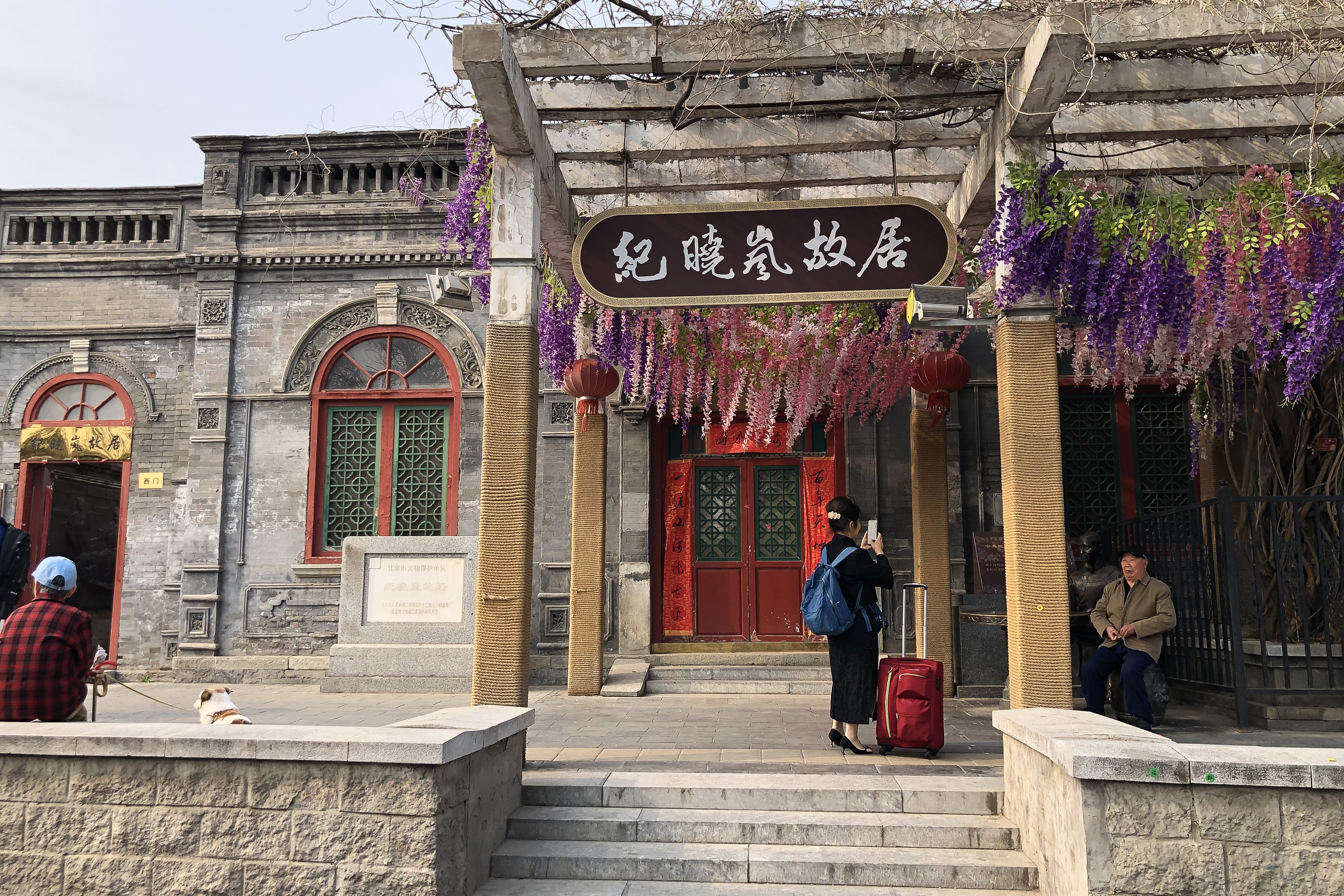
- Interactive map of the Ji Xiaolan Residence area

General information
- Location: Beijing, China

The Ji Xiaolan Residence (Chinese: 阅微草堂; pinyin: Yùewēi cǎotáng) is located at No. 241 West Main Street at Zhushikou in Beijing, China. It was originally the residence of Yue Zhongqi (岳鍾琪), (a descendant of Yue Fei), the Minister of War (兵部尚書) and Ji Yun (Ji Xiaolan), Governor-General of Shanxi and Gansu provinces during the reign of the Yongzheng Emperor in the Qing dynasty. Ji Yun lived at this address for two periods of his life: from the age of 11 to 39, and again from the age of 48 to 82. Yuewei Cottage is a nickname for the residence given by Ji himself. He wrote Fantastic Tales By Ji Xiaolan at this residence. In volume 15, Lend An Ear to Something Without Taking It Seriously, he wrote: "Hufang bridge used to be the residence of Weixing Gong (Yue Zhongqi). There is a stone, about seven or eight feet in height, lying in the east of the site. It is said that the stone was a gift from the Yongzheng Emperor when he began to construct the house. It was transported from Tuer mountain. It holds pride of place among all the Taihu stones in Nancheng, hence I am called The Old Man of the Lonely Stone." The original Taihu stones of Yuewei Cottage were sent back to Tuer Mountain, in Yingtai, Zhongnanhai.

== Evolution and present day ==
A horizontal inscribed board reading "Yuewei Cottage" was hung over the door of the north room in the original east courtyard of Yuewei Cottage, but later it was taken away by people working in Zhili Guild Hall. In the courtyard, Chaenomeles speciosa (the flowering quince) and wisteria planted by Ji Xiaolan himself still flourish today, producing a remarkable floral aroma in spring. Ji Xiaolan once wrote in Fantastic Tales By Ji Xiaolan that "The wisteria is still there. It can be supported only by the wood which is used as pillars. Its shade covers the central room yard. Its vines have spread to other places and cover the west study room yard. When it blooms, the flowers hang down to the ground like purple clouds, overwhelming people with their fragrance." After Ji Xiaolan's death, the residence has changed hands many times. Notable figures such as Zhili Huiguan, Mei Lanfang, Zhang Boju, Xiao Changhua, Liu Shaobai and many others have all been owners of the estate at various time. Mei Lanfang also once established the National Opera Association and the Spreading and Learning Site of National Opera here. In the 1950s, it became a Communist Party school in Xuanwu District, Beijing. In October, 1959, a Shanxi cuisine restaurant, namely Jinyang Restaurant, opened for business here with the help of Peng Zhen, then the mayor of Beijing. Because it was the residence of Ji Xiaolan, many men of letters gathered there to admire the vines, including Lao She, Zang Kejia and Cao Yu. Moreover, the residence has proven popular with a lot of international visitors, who come to experience its artistic atmosphere. George Herbert Walker Bush, the former president of the U.S.A, George P. Shultz and Colin Powell, two American Secretaries of State as well as other notable figures have dined there, tasting the characteristic crispy fried duck. In 1986, the restaurant was enrolled as a Major Site Protected for Its Historical and Cultural Value at the National Level in Xuanwu District (now merged into Xicheng District). In 2000, during the reconstruction of Liangguang Road in Beijing, the Former Residence of Ji Xiaolan was slated for demolition. However, after the protest from experts and appeals to the public, the construction plans were revised to avoid it. At the beginning of 2002, Jinyang Restaurant moved to a hall at the east side from the residence's yard. The government invested in the reconstruction of the residence and officially opened to the public. In the year 2003, the Former Residence of Ji Xiaolan was added to the list of Major Site Protected for Its Historical and Cultural Value at the National Level of Beijing.
