= Liu Songnian =

Painter (1174–1224)

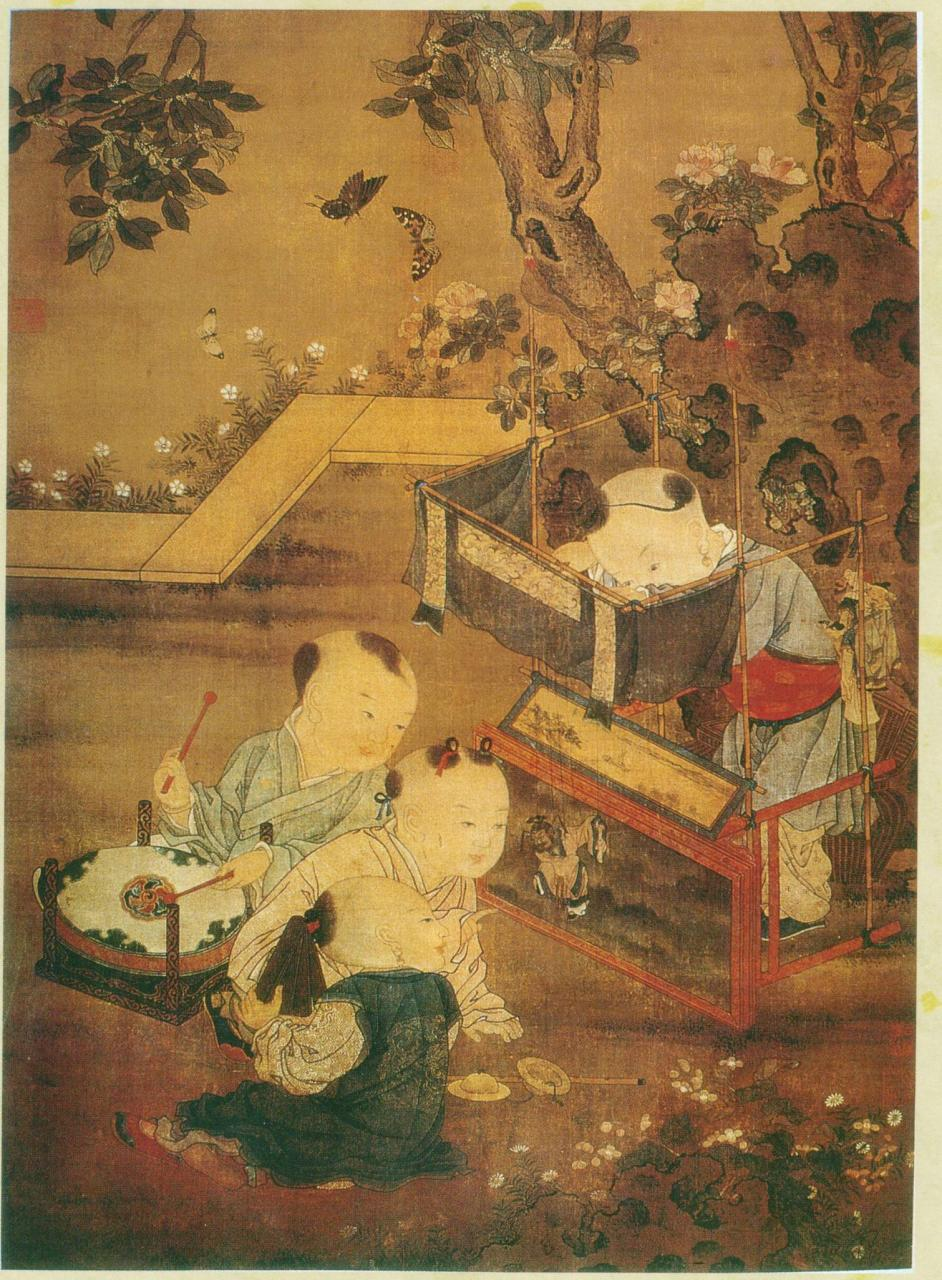
A Children's Puppet Show by Liu Songnian

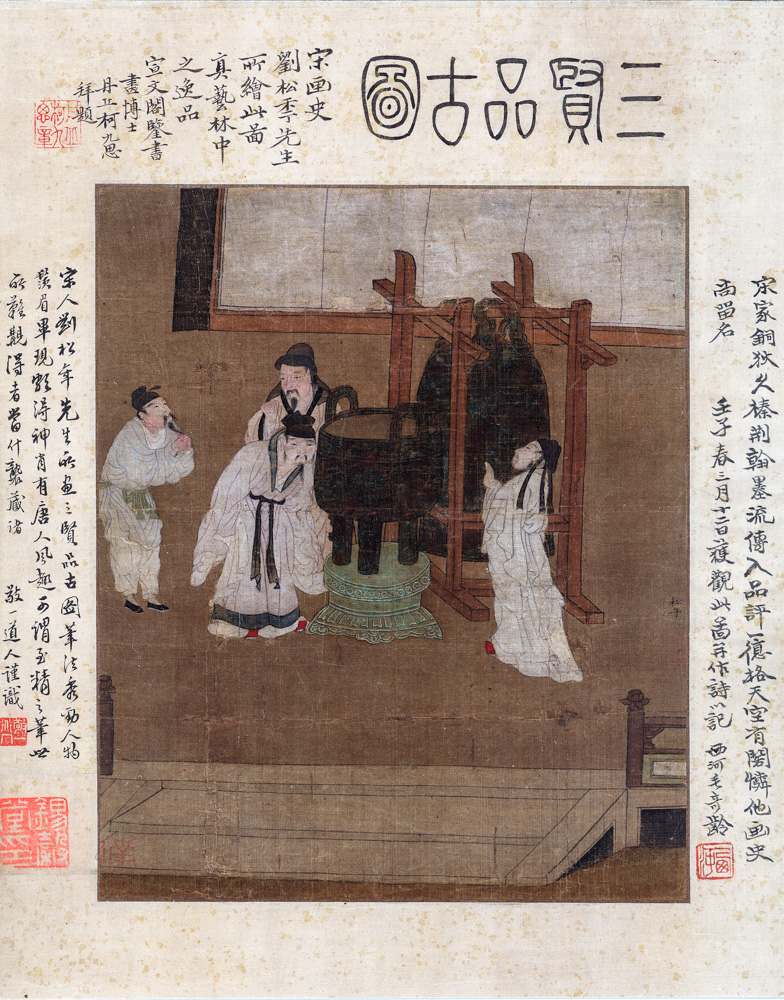
"Three Sages Appreciating Antique" by Liu Songnian. Polychrome on silk. Southern Song Dynasty (abt 1300 CE). Private collection.

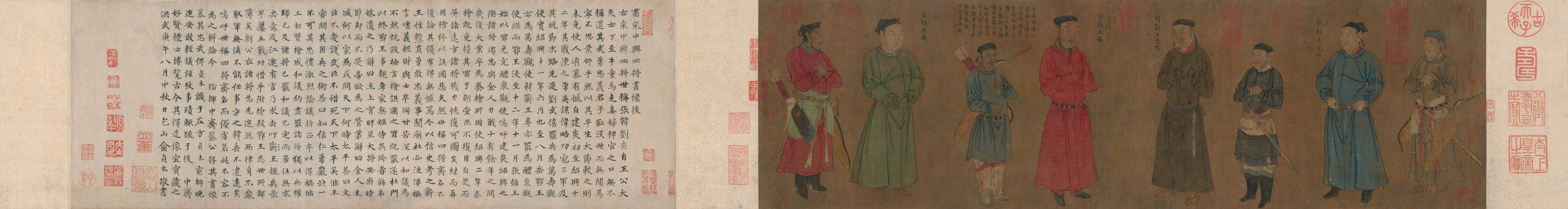
"Four Generals of Zhongxing" by Liu Songnian: Depicted were four generals regarded by Liu as having contributed greatly to the defence of Southern Song: Yue Fei (second from left), Zhang Jun (fourth from left), Liu Guangshi (second from right) and Han Shizhong (fourth from right)

Liu Songnian (刘松年 or traditional Liu Sung-nien, 1174–1224 CE), was a Chinese landscape painter during the early Southern Song Dynasty (1127–1279). He was active from about 1190-1230 and is considered one of the Four Masters of the Southern Song dynasty, which also included Li Tang, Ma Yuan and Xia Gui. He studied and worked at the Imperial Academy of Painting in Hangzhou, capital of the Southern Song dynasty.

Liu entered the Southern Song Imperial Academy of Painting as a student in 1189, and went on to become a painter-in-attendance from 1190 to 1194. During the reign of Emperor Ningzong of Song, he received a prestigious award for his work. Liu followed the tradition of Li Tang. Liu's style influenced the work of Ma Yuan and Xia Gui.

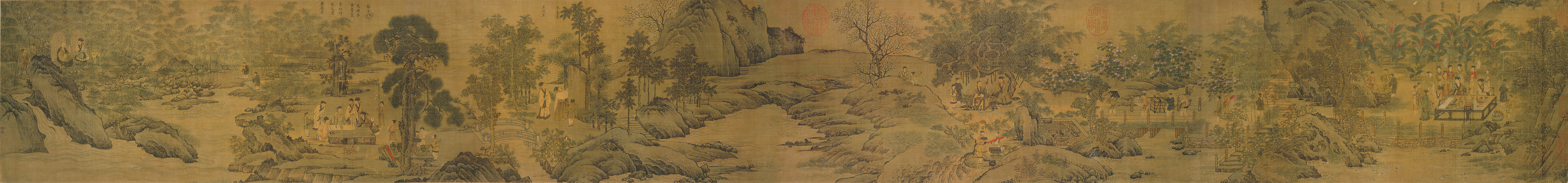
Literary Gathering in the Western Garden, attributed to Liu Songnian

== Additional resources ==
"Liu Songnian". Encyclopædia Britannica. Encyclopædia Britannica Online. Encyclopædia Britannica Inc., 2013. Web. 10 Mar. 2013 <http://www.britannica.com/EBchecked/topic/344504/Liu-Songnian>.
