= Treaty of Shaoxing =

1141 peace treaty between Jin and Southern Song

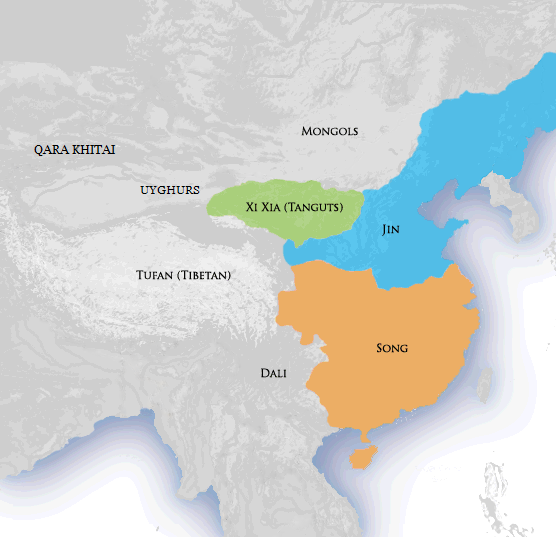
Southern Song and Jin in 1142 after the Treaty of Shaoxing.

The Treaty of Shaoxing (Chinese: 绍兴和议; pinyin: Shàoxīng Héyì) was the agreement and truce that ended the protracted military conflicts between the Jin dynasty and the Southern Song dynasty. It also legally drew up the boundaries of the two countries and forced the Song dynasty to renounce all claims to its former (Northern Song) territories north of the Qinling Huaihe Line, which included its former capital of Kaifeng. Emperor Gaozong of Song subsequently executed the anti-Jin faction general Yue Fei after the treaty.

The treaty was signed in 1141, and under it the Southern Song agreed to paying tribute of 250,000 taels and 250,000 packs of silk to the suzerain Jin every year (until 1164, when Jin launched a further war against the Southern Song). The treaty was formally ratified on 11 October 1142 when a Jin envoy visited the Song court. The treaty reduced the Southern Song Dynasty into a quasi-tributary state of the Jin dynasty.

== See also ==
- Alliance on the Sea
- History of the Song dynasty
- Jin–Song Wars
- List of treaties
- Timeline of the Jin–Song Wars
