= Timeline of the Jin–Song wars =

Series of armed conflicts conducted by Jin dynasty

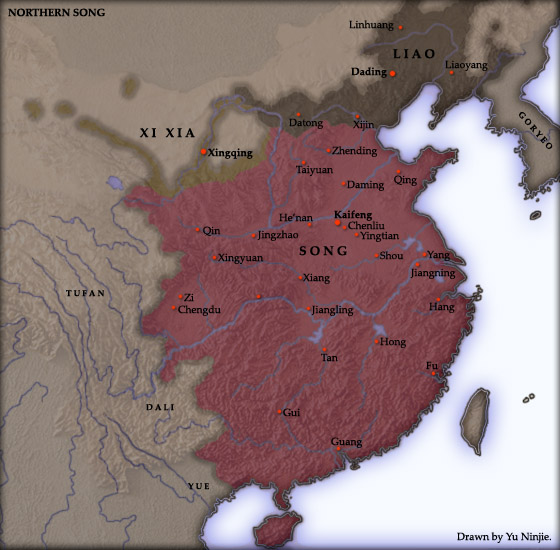
Northern Song (pink)

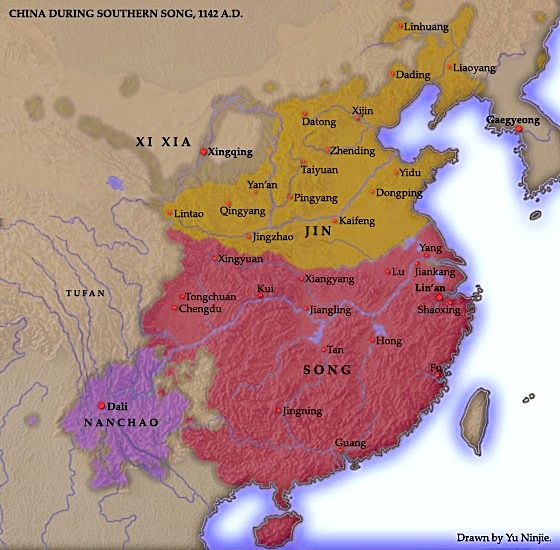
Southern Song (pink)

The Song dynasty before and after the Jin conquests

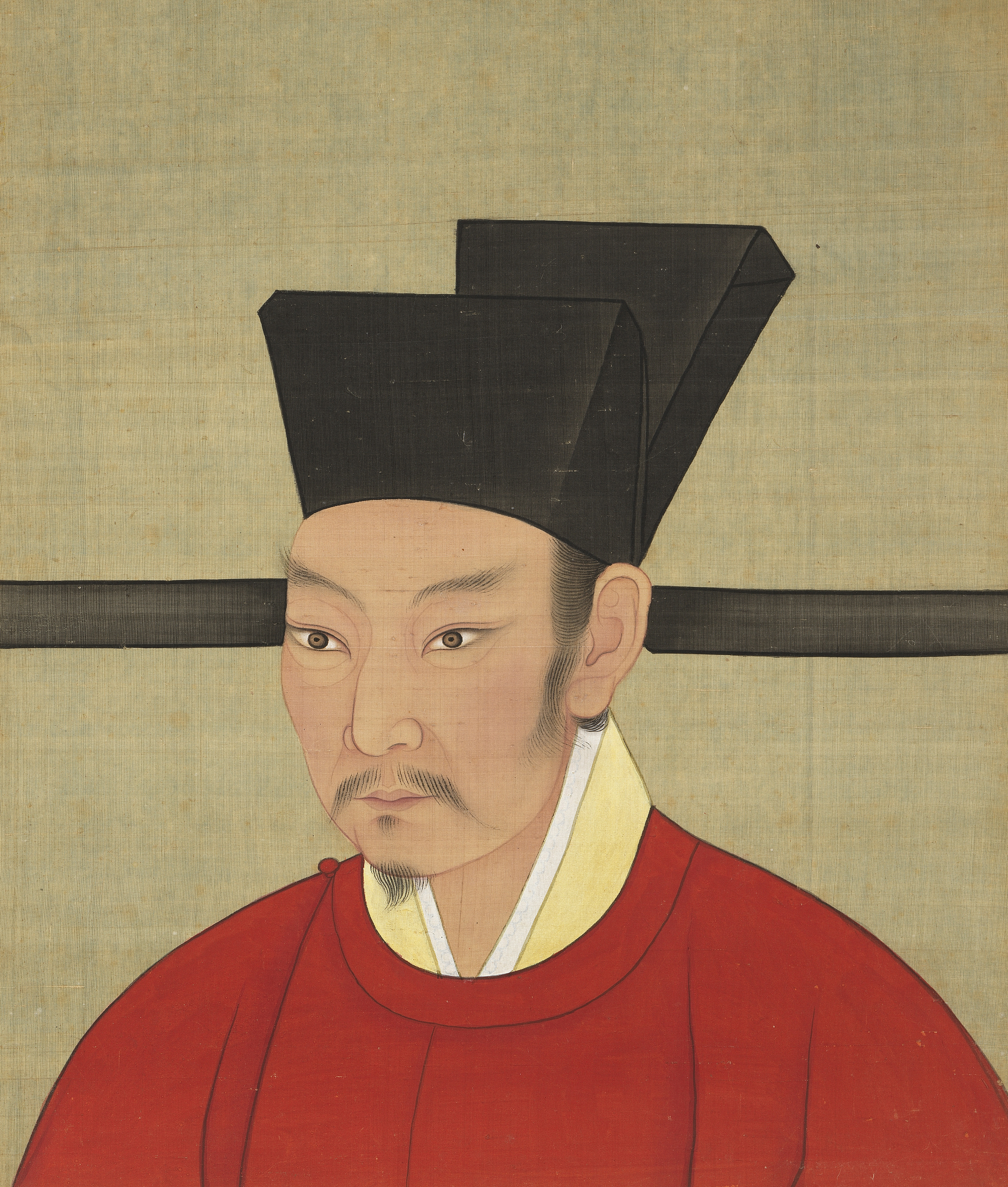
Emperor Qinzong of Song was imprisoned and taken north to Manchuria as a hostage of the Jin dynasty during the Jin–Song Wars.

The Jin–Song wars were a series of armed conflicts conducted by the Jurchen-led Jin dynasty and the Song dynasty in the 12th and 13th centuries. The Jurchens were a Tungusic–speaking tribal confederation native to Manchuria. They overthrew the Khitan-led Liao dynasty in 1122 and declared the establishment of a new dynasty, the Jin. Diplomatic relations between the Jin and Song deteriorated, and the Jurchens first declared war on the Song dynasty in November 1125.

Two armies were dispatched against the Song. One army captured the provincial capital of Taiyuan, while the other besieged the Song capital of Kaifeng. The Jin withdrew when the Song promised to pay an annual indemnity. As the Song dynasty weakened, the Jin armies conducted a second siege against Kaifeng. The city was captured and looted, and the Song dynasty emperor, Emperor Qinzong, was imprisoned and taken north to Manchuria as a hostage. The remainder of the Song court retreated to southern China, beginning the Southern Song period of Chinese history. Two puppet governments, first the Da Chu dynasty and later the state of Qi, were established by the Jin as buffer states between the Song and Manchuria.

The Jin marched southward with the aim of conquering the Southern Song, but counteroffensives by Chinese generals like Yue Fei halted their advance. A peace accord, the Treaty of Shaoxing, was negotiated and ratified in 1142, establishing the Huai River as the boundary between the two empires. Peace between the Song and Jin was interrupted twice. Wanyan Liang invaded the Southern Song in 1161, while Song revanchists tried and failed to retake northern China in 1204.

The Jin–Song wars were notable for the appearance of new technological innovations. The siege of De'an in 1132 included the first recorded use of the fire lance, an early gunpowder weapon and an ancestor of the firearm. The huopao, an incendiary bomb, was employed in a number of battles and gunpowder bombs made of cast iron were used in a siege in 1221. The Jurchens migrated south and settled in northern China, where they adopted the language and Confucian culture of the local inhabitants. The Jin dynasty government grew into a centralized imperial bureaucracy structured in the same manner as previous dynasties of China. Both the Song and Jin dynasties ended in the 13th century as the Mongol Empire expanded across Asia.

== Campaigns against the Northern Song ==
Year	Date (Note: Omitted if the date of the event is unknown.)	Event	Ref(s)
1125	November	Jin dynasty declares war against the Song dynasty and dispatches two armies.	
1126	January	Jin forces reach Taiyuan and besiege the city.	
1126	January 27	Jin army crosses the Yellow River on their way to the Song capital of Kaifeng.	
1126	January 28	Emperor Huizong of Song abdicates and Emperor Qinzong is enthroned as Jin forces approach Kaifeng.	
1126	January 31	Jin forces besiege Kaifeng.	
1126	February 10	Siege of Kaifeng ends.	
1126	March 5	The Jin army retreats from Kaifeng after the Song emperor promises to pay an annual indemnity.	
1126	June	Two armies dispatched by Emperor Qinzong to Taiyuan, Zhongshan, and Hejian are defeated by the Jin.	
1126	December	The Jin army that captured Taiyuan arrives in Kaifeng. The second siege of Kaifeng begins.	
1127	January 9	During the Jingkang Incident, Kaifeng surrenders and the city is looted by Jin forces.	
1127	May	Emperor Qinzong, former Emperor Huizong, and members of the Song court are taken north to Manchuria as prisoners.	
1129		Song dynasty capital moved to Nanjing. End of the Northern Song.	
1129		Former Song official Liu Yu is enthroned as the emperor of the Jin puppet state of Qi.	

== Campaigns against the Southern Song ==
Year	Date	Event	Ref(s)
1132		De'an is besieged by Jin forces. The battle is the earliest known use of the fire lance, an ancestor of the firearm.	
1133		Yue Fei is appointed a general tasked with leading the largest army in a region near the central Yangtze River.	
1134		Yue Fei commanded a military campaign that recaptured much of the territory seized by the Jin.	
1135		Qi captures the town of Xiangyang.	
1137		Jin dynasty dissolves the Qi state and demotes Liu Yu as emperor.	
1140		Yue Fei launches a successful military expedition against the Jin and makes considerable territorial gains, but was forced to withdraw by Emperor Gaozong.	
1141		Yue Fei is imprisoned as Gaozong moves forward with his plans for a peace treaty.	
1141	October	Negotiations for a peace treaty begins between the Song and Jin.	
1142		Yue Fei is poisoned in his jail cell.	
1142	October	The peace treaty, the Shaoxing Accord, is ratified and the Song agrees to pay an annual indemnity. The Huai River is settled as the boundary.	

== After the peace treaty ==
Year	Date	Event	Reference(s)
1152		The Jin emperor Wanyan Liang moves his capital south from Manchuria to Beijing.	
1158		Wanyan Liang blames the Song for breaching the peace treaty after it procured horses from the frontier regions.	
1159		The Jin begins preparations for a war against the Song.	
1161	Summer	Conscription of ethnic Han soldiers for the Jin war effort ends.	
1161	June 14	Jin envoys arrive in the Song on the eve of the invasion. Their behavior led to suspicions of a Jin plot against the Song.	
1161	October 15	Jin forces depart from Kaifeng.	
1161	October 28	The Jin army reaches the Huai River and continue their march to the Yangtze River.	
1161	November 26–27	Jin forces try to capture the city of Caishi during the Battle of Caishi but are repelled by the Song.	
1161		The Battle of Tangdao is fought at sea between the Jin and the Song. The Song navy uses incendiary bombs and other weapons against a Jin fleet of 600 ships.	
1161	December 15	Wanyan Liang is assassinated in his military camp by his officers, ending the Jurchen invasion.	
1204		Song armies begin raiding the Jin settlements north of the Huai River.	
1206	June 14	The Song declares war against the Jin.	
1206	Fall	Jin armies capture towns and military bases, slowing the Song advance.	
1206	December	Wu Xi, general and governor of Sichuan, defects to the Jin, threatening the war effort.	
1207	March 29	Wu Xi is assassinated by Song loyalists.	
1208	July	Following negotiations for peace, the war ends and Jin forces withdraw.	
1208	November 2	A peace treaty is signed between the Jin and the Song. The Song agreed to continue paying tribute to the Jin.	
1217		Jin forces invade the Song to remedy the territory they had lost to the Mongols.	
1221		A gunpowder bomb made of cast iron is used as Jin forces try to capture Qizhou, a Song city.	
1224		The Jin and Song agreed to a peace treaty. Song discontinues its annual tributes to the Jurchens.	
1234	February 9	The Jin dynasty ends after an invasion by the Mongols and the Song.	

== See also ==
- History of the Song dynasty
