= Yue Fei =

Song dynasty Chinese general (1103–1142)

- 岳飛
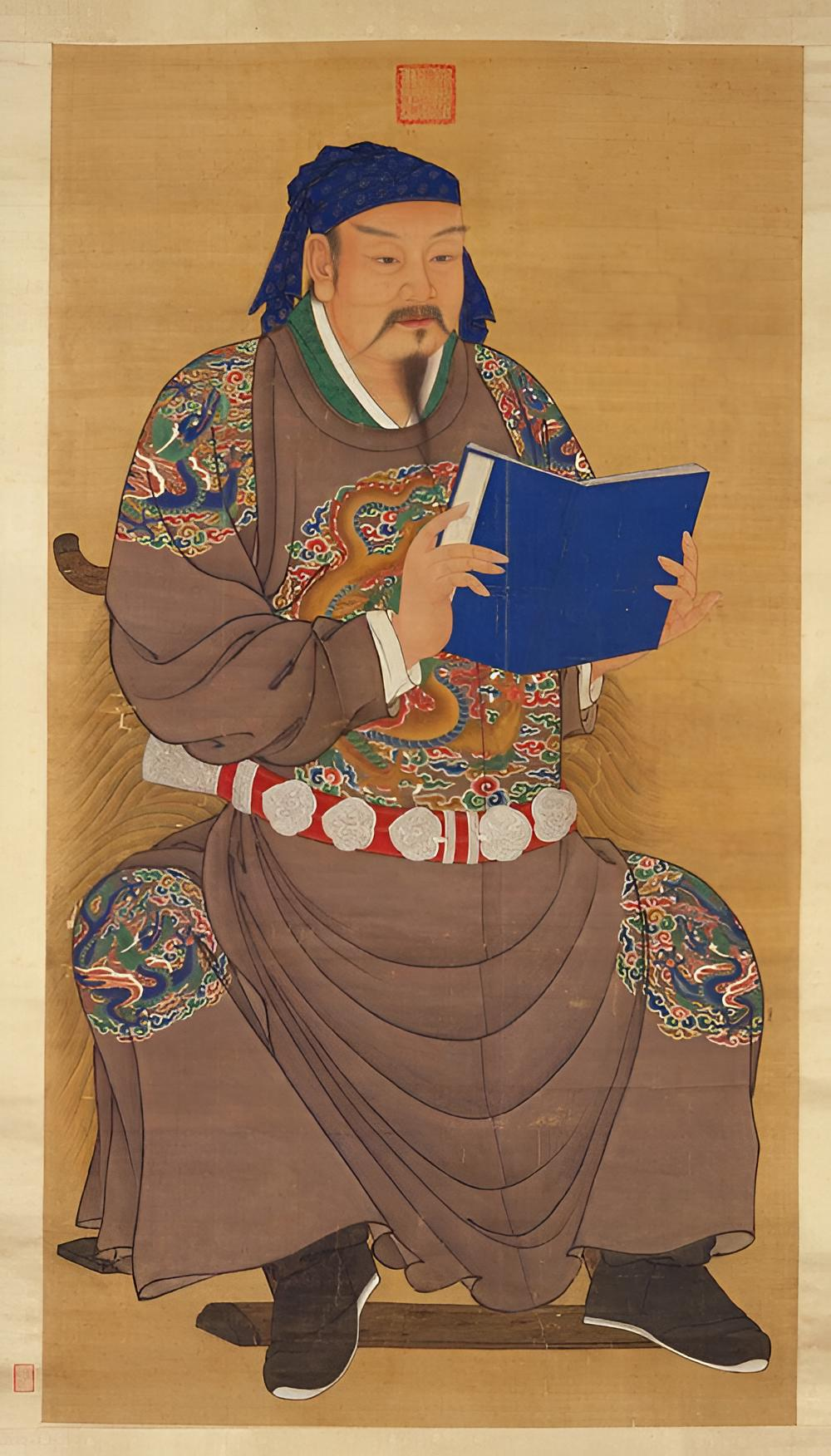
- Qing dynasty illustration of Yue Fei
- Born: March 24, 1103; Tangyin, Anyang, Henan, Northern Song dynasty
- Died: January 28, 1142 (aged 38); Hangzhou, Zhejiang, Southern Song dynasty
- Spouse(s): Lady Liu; Li Wa
- Children: Yue Yun; Yue Lei; Yue Lin; Yue Zhen; Yue Ting; Yue Anniang
- Relatives: Yue He (father); Lady Yao (mother)
- Military career
- Allegiance: Song dynasty
- Service years: 1122–1142
- Conflicts: Song–Jin wars

Chinese name
- Traditional Chinese: 岳飛
- Simplified Chinese: 岳飞
Transcriptions
Standard Mandarin
- Hanyu Pinyin: Yuè Fēi
- Wade–Giles: Yüeh^{4} Fei^{1}
- IPA: [ɥê féɪ]
Wu
- Suzhounese: Ngoq^{8} Fi^{1}
Gan
- Romanization: Ngok5 Fi1
Yue: Cantonese
- Yale Romanization: Ngohk Fēi
- Jyutping: Ngok^{6} Fei^{1}
- IPA: [ŋɔk̚˨ fej˥]
Southern Min
- Tâi-lô: Ga̍k Hui
Middle Chinese
- Middle Chinese: /ŋˠʌk̚ pʉi/

Yue Fei (Chinese: 岳飛; March 24, 1103 – January 28, 1142), courtesy name Pengju (鵬舉), was a Chinese military general of the Song dynasty and is remembered as a patriotic national hero, known for leading its forces in the wars in the 12th century between Southern Song and the Jurchen-led Jin dynasty in northern China. Because of his warlike stance, he was put to death by the Southern Song government in 1142 under a frameup, after a negotiated peace was achieved with the Jin dynasty. He was posthumously pardoned. Yue Fei is depicted in the Wu Shuang Pu by Jin Guliang.

Yue Fei's ancestral home was in Xiaoti, Yonghe Village, Tangyin, Xiangzhou, Henan (in present-day Tangyin County, Anyang, Henan). He was granted the posthumous name Wumu (武穆) by Emperor Xiaozong in 1169, and later granted the noble title King of E (鄂王) posthumously by the Emperor Ningzong in 1211. Since his death and after the fall of the Song dynasty in 1279, Yue Fei is widely seen as a culture hero in China; he has evolved into a paragon of loyalty in Chinese culture.

== Biographies ==
=== Biography of Yue Fei ===
A biography of Yue Fei, the Eguo Jintuo Zubian (鄂國金佗稡編), was written 60 years after his death by his grandson, the poet and historian Yue Ke (岳柯) (1183–post 1240). In 1346 it was incorporated into the History of Song, a 496-chapter record of historical events and biographies of noted Song dynasty individuals, compiled by Yuan dynasty prime minister Toqto'a and others. Yue Fei's biography is found in the 365th chapter of the book and is numbered biography 124 in volume 365. Some later historians including Deng Guangming (1907–1998) now doubt the veracity of many of Yue Ke's claims about his grandfather.

According to the History of Song, Yue Fei was named "Fei", meaning to fly, because at the time he was born, "a large bird like a swan landed on the roof of his house".

=== Chronicle of Yue, Prince of E of Song ===
The Chronicle of Yue, Prince of E of Song (宋岳鄂王年譜; 宋岳鄂王年谱; Sòng Yuè È Wáng Niánpǔ) was written by Qian Ruwen (錢汝雯) in 1924.

== Birth and early life ==
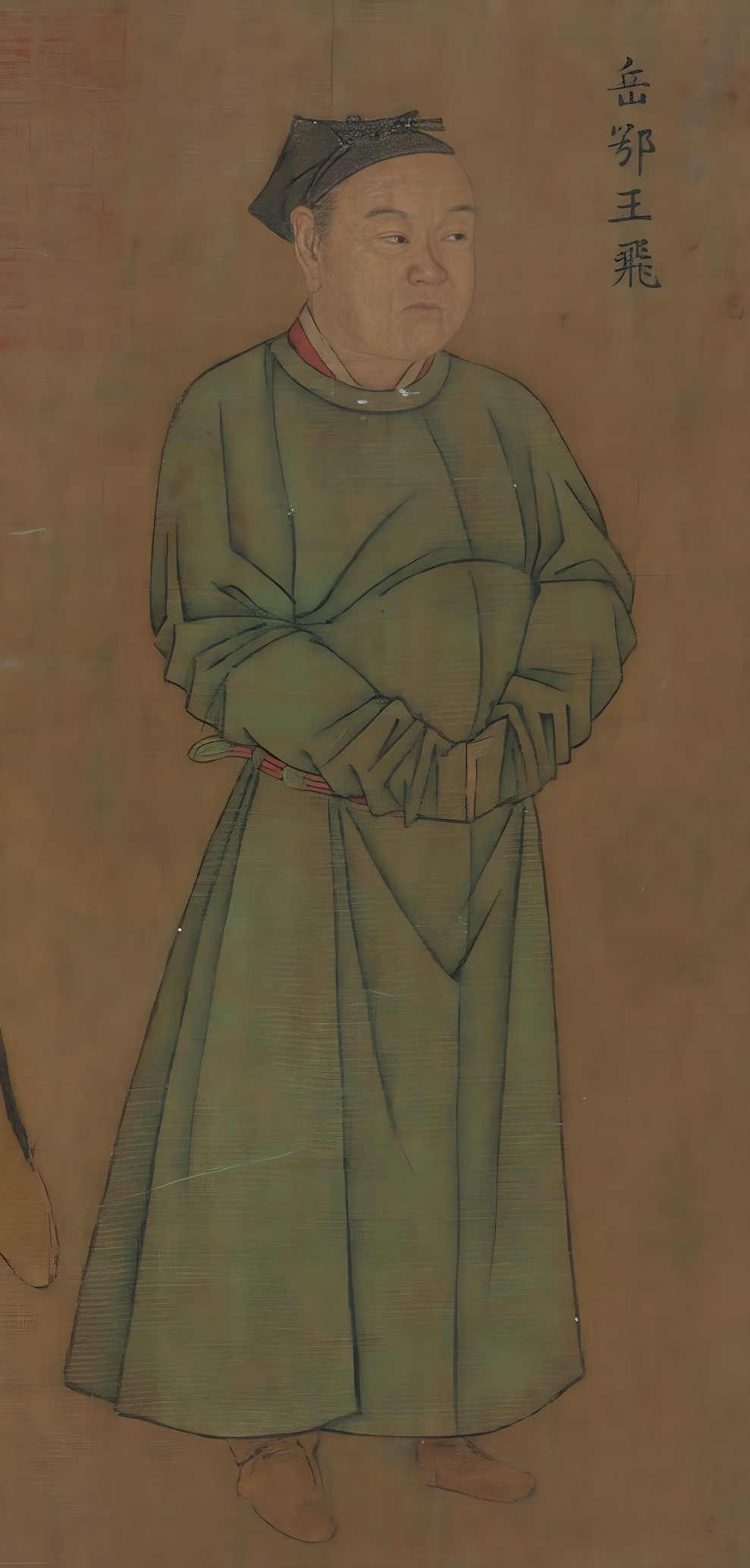
Portrait of Yue Fei in Liu Songnian's Four Generals of the Restoration.

Several sources state that Yue was born into a poor tenant farmer's family in Tangyin County, Anyang prefecture, Henan province. The Biography of Yue Fei mentions a flood which displaced Yue Fei's family during his childhood, but his father survived. It reads,

After [the death of his teacher Zhou Tong], [Yue Fei] would offer sacrifices at his tomb. His father praised him for his faithfulness and asked him, "When you are employed to cope with the affairs of the time, will you then not have to sacrifice yourself for the empire and die for your duty?" (侗死，溯望設祭于其冢。父義之，曰："汝為時用，其徇國死義乎。)

Yue Fei's father used his family's plot of land for humanitarian efforts, but after it was destroyed in the flood, the young Yue Fei was forced to help his father toil in the fields to survive. Yue received most of his primary education from his father. In 1122 Yue joined the army, but had to return home later that year after the death of his father. In ancient China, a person was required by law to temporarily resign from their job when their parents died so they could observe the customary period of mourning. For instance, Yue would have had to mourn his father's death for three years, but in all actually only 27 months. During this time, he would wear coarse mourning robes, caps, and slippers, while abstaining from silken garments. When his mother died in 1136, he retired from a decisive battle against the Jin dynasty for the mourning period, but he was forced to cut the bereavement short because his generals begged him to come back.

Shuo Yue Quanzhuan gives a very detailed fictional account of Yue's early life. The novel states after being swept from Henan to Hubei, Yue and his mother are saved by the country squire Wang Ming (王明) and are permitted to stay in Wang's manor as domestic helpers. The young Yue Fei later becomes the adopted son and student of the Wang family's teacher, Zhou Tong, a famous master of military skills. (Zhou Tong is not to be confused with the similarly named "Little Tyrant" in Water Margin.) Zhou teaches Yue and his three sworn brothers – Wang Gui (王貴), Tang Huai (湯懷) and Zhang Xian (張顯) – literary lessons on odd days and military lessons, involving archery and the eighteen weapons of war, on even days.

After years of practice, Zhou Tong enters his students into the Tangyin County military examination, in which Yue Fei wins first place by shooting a succession of nine arrows through the bullseye of a target 240 paces away. After this display of archery, Yue is asked to marry the daughter of Li Chun (李春), an old friend of Zhou and the county magistrate who presided over the military examination. However, Zhou soon dies of an illness and Yue lives by his grave through the winter until the second month of the new year when his sworn brothers come and tear it down, forcing him to return home and take care of his mother.

Yue eventually marries and later participates in the imperial military examination in the Song capital of Kaifeng. There, he defeats all competitors and even turns down an offer from Cai Gui (蔡桂), the Prince of Liang, to be richly rewarded if he forfeits his chance for the military degree. This angers the prince and both agree to fight a private duel in which Yue kills the prince and is forced to flee the city for fear of being executed. Shortly thereafter, he joins the Song army to fight the invading armies of the Jurchen-ruled Jin dynasty.

The Yue Fei Biography states,

When [Yue] was born, a Peng flew crowing over the house, so his father named the child Fei [(飛 – "flight")]. Before [Yue] was even a month old, the Yellow River flooded, so his mother got inside of the center of a clay jar and held on to baby Yue. The violent waves pushed the jar down river, where they landed ashore ... Despite his family's poverty, [Yue Fei] was studious, and particularly favored the Zuo Zhuan edition of the Spring and Autumn Annals and the strategies of Sun Tzu and Wu Qi. (飛生時，有大禽若鵠，飛鳴室上，因以為名。未彌月，河決內黃，水暴至，母姚抱飛坐瓮中，衝濤及岸得免，人異之。-- 家貧力學，尤好【左氏春秋】、孫吳兵法。)

According to a book by martial arts master Liang Shouyu, "[A] Dapeng is a great bird that lived in ancient China. Legend has it, that Dapeng Jinchi Mingwang was the guardian that stayed above the head of Gautama Buddha. Dapeng could get rid of all evil in any area. Even the Monkey King was no match for it. During the Song dynasty the government was corrupt and foreigners were constantly invading China. Sakyamuni sent Dapeng down to earth to protect China. Dapeng descended to Earth and was born as Yue Fei."

=== Martial training ===
Illustration of Zhou Tong, Yue Fei's teacher

The Biography of Yue Fei states, "Yue Fei possessed supernatural power and before his adulthood, he was able to draw a bow of 300 catties (400 pounds (180 kg)) and a crossbow of eight stone (960 catties, 1,280 pounds (580 kg)). Yue Fei learned archery from Zhou Tong. He learned everything and could shoot with his left and right hands." Shuo Yue Quanzhuan states Zhou teaches Yue and his sworn brothers archery and all of the eighteen weapons of war. This novel also says Yue was Zhou's third student after Lin Chong and Lu Junyi of the 108 outlaws in Water Margin. The E Wang Shi records, "When Yue Fei reached adulthood, his maternal grandfather, Yao Daweng (姚大翁), hired a spear expert, Chen Guang, to teach Yue Fei spear fighting."

Both the Biography of Yue Fei and E Wang Shi mention Yue learning from Zhou and Chen at or before his adulthood. The Chinese character representing "adulthood" in these sources is ji guan (Chinese: 及冠; pinyin: jí guàn; lit. 'conferring headdress'), an ancient Chinese term that means "20 years old" where a young man was able to wear a formal headdress as a social status of adulthood. So he gained all of his martial arts knowledge by the time he joined the army at the age of 19.

These chronicles do not mention Yue's masters teaching him martial arts style; just archery, spearplay and military tactics. However non-historical or scholarly sources state, in addition to those already mentioned, Zhou Tong taught Yue other skills such as hand-to-hand combat and horseback riding. Yet again, these do not mention any specific martial arts style. One legend says Zhou took young Yue to an unspecified place to meet a Buddhist hermit who taught him the Emei Dapeng qigong (峨嵋大鵬氣功) style. This is supposedly the source of his legendary strength and martial arts abilities. According to thirteenth generation lineage Tai He ("Great Harmony") Wudangquan master Fan Keping (范克平), Zhou Tong was a master of various "hard qigong" exercises.

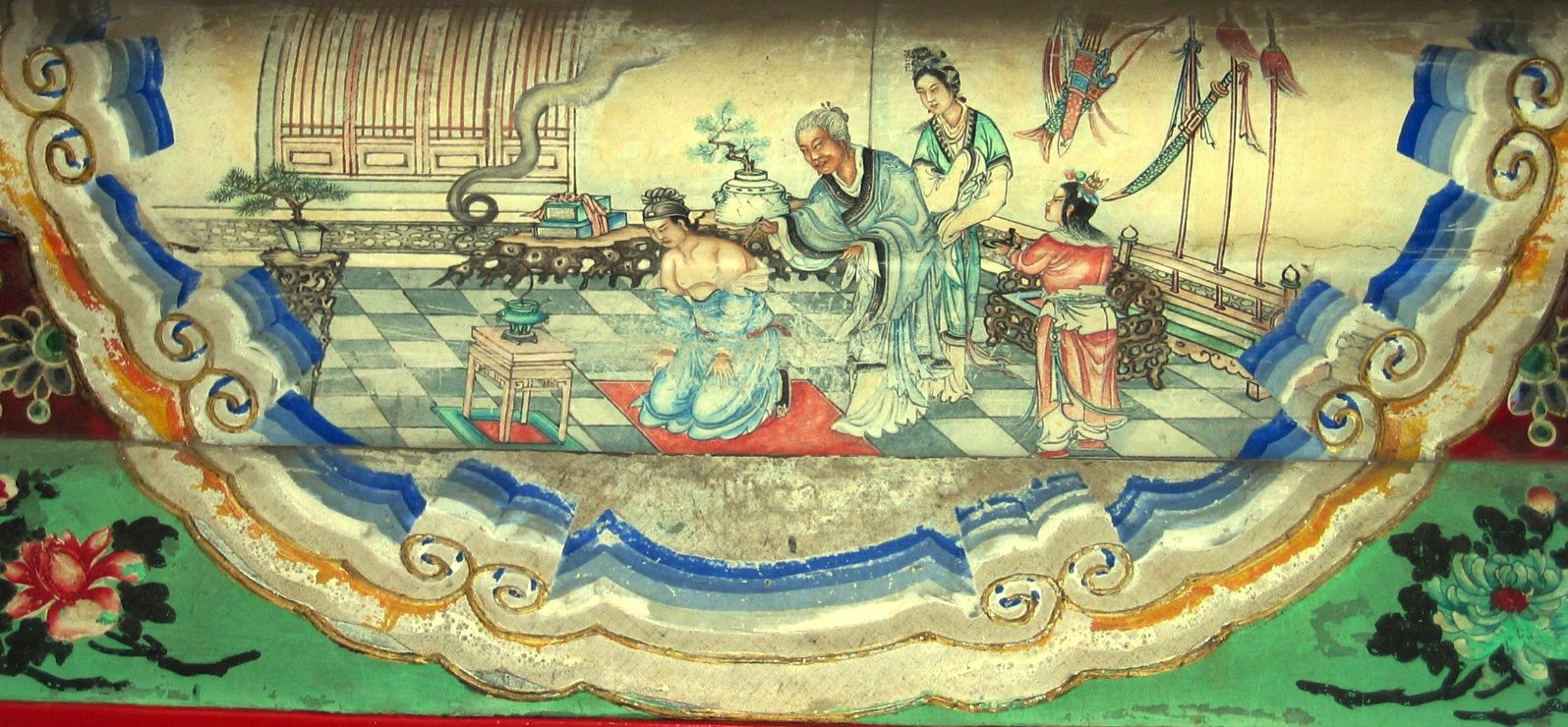
Yue Fei's mother writes jin zhong bao guo on his back, as depicted in a "Suzhou style" beam decoration at the Summer Palace, Beijing.

=== Yue Fei's tattoo ===
According to historical records and legend, Yue had the four Chinese characters 盡忠報國 (jìn zhōng bào guó, "serve the country with the utmost loyalty") tattooed across his back. The Biography of Yue Fei says after Qin Hui sent agents to arrest Yue and his son, he was taken before the court and charged with treason, but

飛裂裳以背示鑄，有盡忠報國四大字，深入膚理。既而閱實無左驗，鑄明其無辜。
Yue ripped his jacket to reveal the four tattooed characters of "serve the country with the utmost loyalty" on his back. This proved that he was clearly innocent of the charges.

Later fictionalizations of Yue's biography would build upon the tattoo. For instance, one of his earliest Ming era novels titled The Story of King Yue Who Restored the Song dynasty (大宋中興岳王傳) states that after the Jurchen armies invaded China, young heroes in Yue's village suggest that they join the bandits in the mountains. However, Yue objects and has one of them tattoo the aforementioned characters on his back. Whenever others want to join the bandits, he flashes them the tattoo to change their minds.

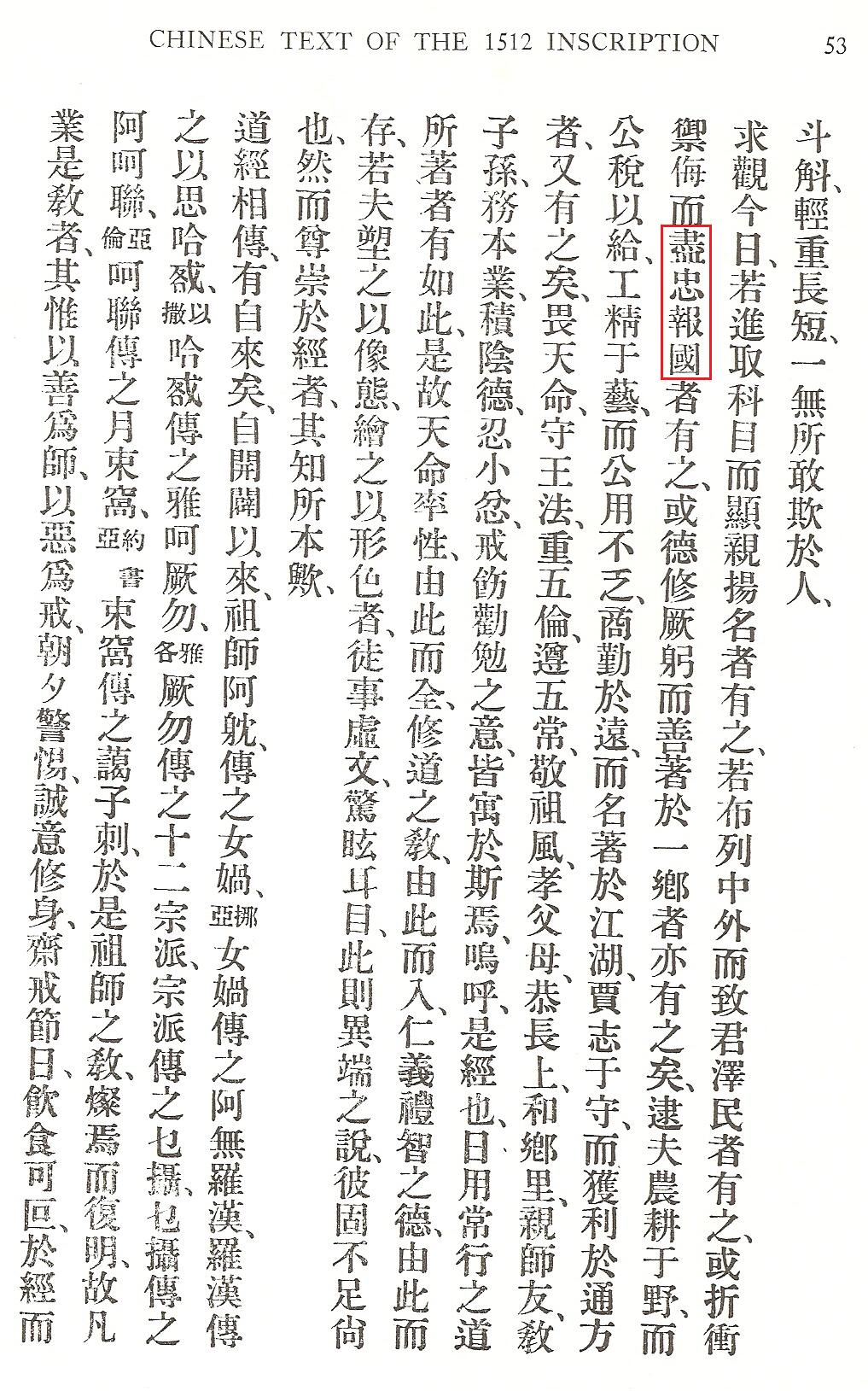
Portion of the stele mentioning the tattoo

The common legend of Yue receiving the tattoo from his mother first appeared in Shuo Yue Quanzhuan, a historical novel. In chapter 21 titled "By a pretext Wang Zuo swore brotherhood, by tattoos Lady Yue instructed her son", Yue denounces the pirate chief Yang Yao (楊幺) and passes on a chance to become a general in his army. Yue Fei's mother then tells her son, "I, your mother, saw that you did not accept recruitment of the rebellious traitor, and that you willingly endure poverty and are not tempted by wealth and status ... But I fear that after my death, there may be some unworthy creature who will entice you ... For these reason ... I want to tattoo on your back the four characters 'Utmost', 'Loyalty', 'Serve' and 'Nation' ... The Lady picked up the brush and wrote out on his spine the four characters for 'serving the nation with the utmost loyalty' ... [So] she bit her teeth, and started pricking. Having finished, she painted the characters with ink mixed with vinegar so that the colour would never fade."

However, the truthfulness of this legend is disputed by modern historians. Documentation before the Qing dynasty record that Yue Fei had hired a tattoo artist to tattoo the four characters on his back. Such documentations appeared in Wumu Jingzhong Zhuan, a novel published in the Ming dynasty, while Shuo Yue Quanzhuan (General Yue Fei) was published in the Qing dynasty.

The Kaifeng Jews, one of many pockets of Chinese Jews living in ancient China, refer to this tattoo in two of their three stele monuments created in 1489, 1512, and 1663. The first mention appeared in a section of the 1489 stele referring to the Jews' "Boundless loyalty to the country and Prince". The second appeared in a section of the 1512 stele about how Jewish soldiers and officers in the Chinese armies were "boundlessly loyal to the country".

== Adult life ==
=== Portrait ===
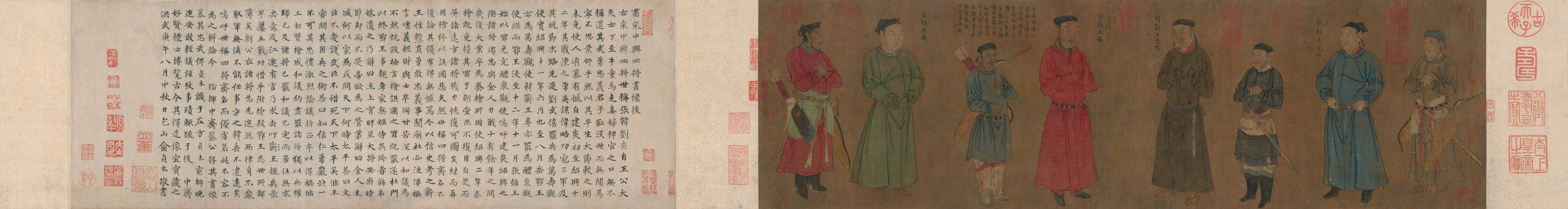
The Four Generals of the Restoration painted by Liu Songnian during the Southern Song dynasty. Yue Fei is the second person from the left. Han Shizhong is fifth from the left and Zhang Jun is fourth from the left.

Southern Song era artist Liu Songnian (劉松年) (1174–1224), who was best known for his realistic works, painted a picture, "Four Generals of the Restoration" (中興四將). The group portrait shows eight people – four generals and four attendants. Starting from the left: attendant, Yue Fei, attendant, Zhang Jun (張浚), Han Shizhong (韓世忠), attendant, Liu Guangshi (劉光世), and attendant.

According to history professor He Zongli of Zhejiang University, the painting shows Yue was more of a scholarly-looking general with a shorter stature and chubbier build than the statue of him displayed in his tomb in Hangzhou since 1979, which portrays him as being tall and skinny. Shen Lixin, an official with the Yue Fei Temple Administration, holds the portrait of Yue Fei from the "Four Generals of the Restoration" to be the most accurate likeness of the general in existence.

=== Character ===
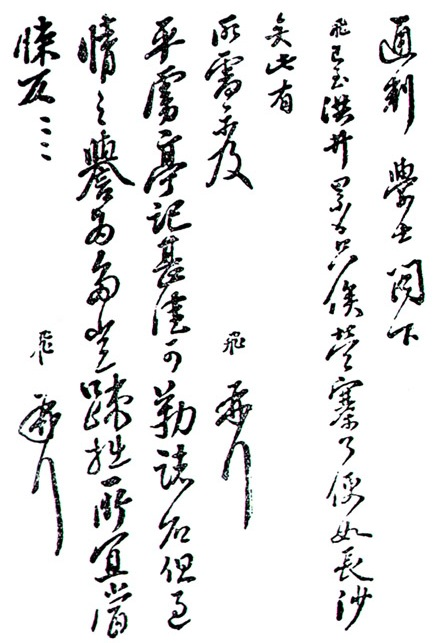
Calligraphy written by Yue Fei

In his From Myth to Myth: The Case of Yüeh Fei's Biography, noted Sinologist Hellmut Wilhelm concluded that Yue Fei purposely patterned his life after famous Chinese heroes from dynasties past and that this ultimately led to his martyrdom. Apart from studying literature under his father Yue He (岳和), Yue Fei loved to read military classics. He favored the Zuo Zhuan commentary on the Spring and Autumn Annals and the strategies of Sun Tzu and Wu Qi. Although his literacy afforded him the chance to become a scholar, which was a position held in much higher regard than the common soldiery during the Song dynasty, Yue chose the military path because there had never been any tradition of civil service in his family. Therefore he had no reason to study Confucian classics in order to surpass the accomplishments of his ancestors or to raise his family's social status to the next level. His fourth generation ancestor, Yue Huan (岳渙), had served as a lingshi (令使) (essentially a low-level functionary), but he was never a full-fledged member of the civil service rank. A second theory is that he joined the military in the hopes of emulating his favorite heroes.

Scholars were always welcome in Yue Fei's camp. He allowed them to come and tell stories and deeds of past heroes to bolster the resolve of his men. This way he was able to teach them about the warriors that he had constructed his own life after. He also hoped that one of these scholars would record his own deeds so he would become a peer amongst his idols. He is recorded in saying that he wished to be considered the equal of Guan Yu and other such famous men from the Three Kingdoms period. Yue succeeded in this endeavor since later "official mythology" placed him on the same level as Guan Yu.

Yue was careful to conduct himself as the ideal Confucian gentleman at all times for fear that any misconduct would be recorded and criticized by people of later dynasties. However he had his faults. He had a problem with alcohol during the early part of his military career. Yue drank in great excess because he believed it fitted the image of heroes of old. However once he nearly killed a colleague in a drunken rage, the emperor made him promise not to drink any more until the Jurchen invaders had been driven away.

=== Family ===
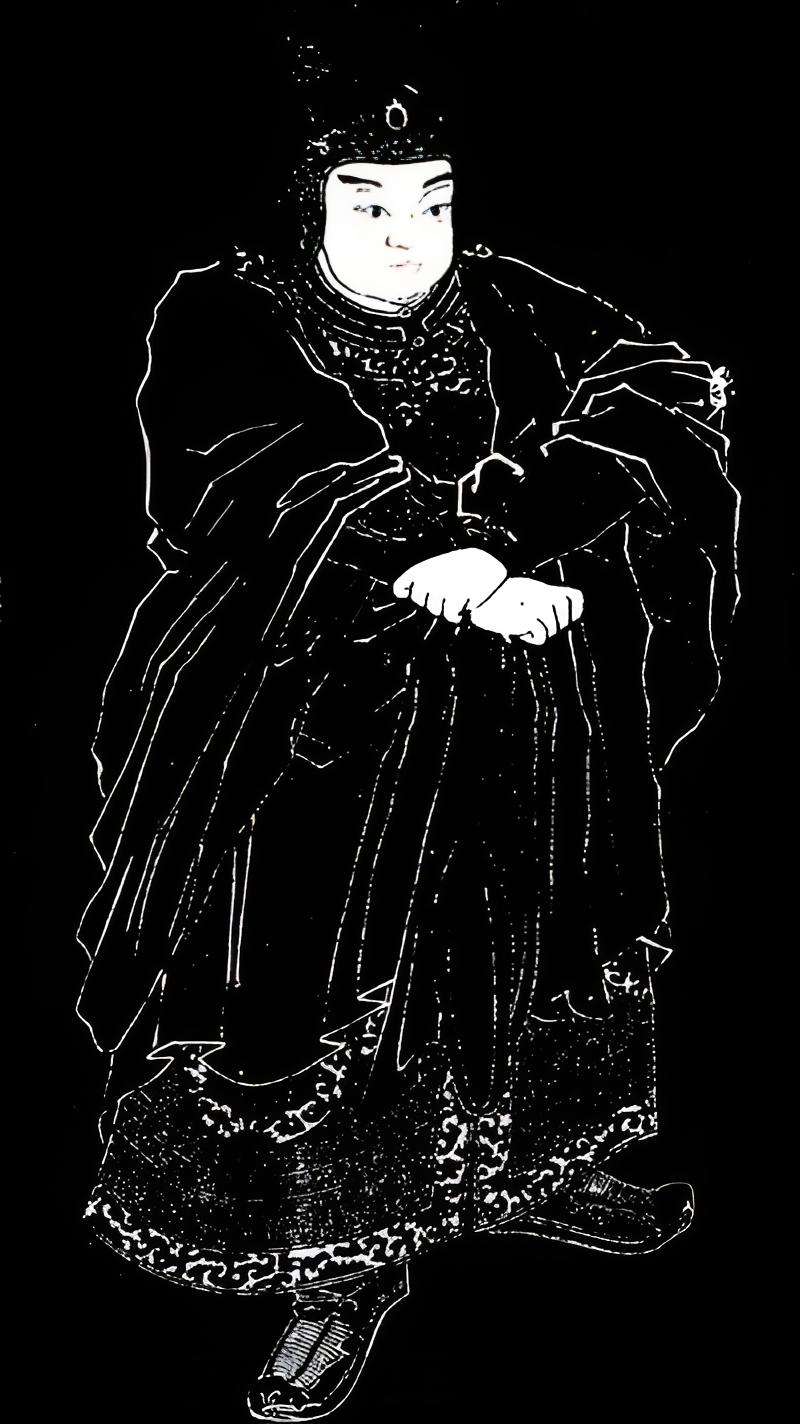
Yue Yun (岳雲), Yue Fei's eldest son

The Biography of Yue Fei states that Yue married his first wife Lady Liu as arranged by his family when he was 15 years old. One year after their marriage, Liu gave birth to Yue Yun (岳雲; 1119–1142). Eight years after their marriage, Liu gave birth to Yue Lei (岳雷). Yue left his ailing mother with his first wife while he went to fight the Jin armies. However she left him (and his mother) and remarried. When Yue was 26 or 27 years old, he later took a second wife Lady Li Wa (李娃) (1101–1175), the daughter of the county magistrate Li Chun. They had three sons, Yue Lin (岳霖), Yue Zhen (岳震), and Yue Ting (岳霆). Yue even discussed "affairs" pertaining to his military career with her. He truly loved her, but his affection for her was second to his desire to rid China of the Jurchen invaders. Her faithfulness to him and his mother was strengthened by the fear that any infidelity or lacking in her care of Lady Yue would result in reprisal.

According to Shuo Yue Quanzhuan, Yue had five sons and one daughter. The History of Song records that Yue Yun (岳雲; 1119–1142) was adopted by Yue Fei at the age of 12 but historical consensus and other contemporaneous records confirmed that he was actually his biological son; Yue Lei (岳雷), the second, succeeded to his father's post; Yue Lin (岳霖) was the third; Yue Zhen (岳震) was the fourth; and Yue Ting (岳霆) the fifth, was still young at the time of his father's death.

Yue Anniang (岳安娘) was Yue Fei's daughter who would later married to Gao Zuo (高祚). Yue Fei's presumed second daughter named Yue Yinping (岳銀瓶), whose original name was Yue Xiao'e (岳孝娥). The novel states she committed suicide at the age of 13 by drowning herself in the well after her father's death. However, history books during Southern Song dynasty do not mention her name and the story of Yue Yinping only began to take shape during the Yuan dynasty period, and therefore she should be considered a fictional character.

Yue forbade his sons from having concubines, although he almost took one himself. Even though she was presented by a friend, he did not accept her because she laughed when he asked her if she could "share the hardships of camp life" with him. He knew she was liberal and would have sex with the other soldiers.

Though not mentioned in the memoir written by Yue Fei's grandson, some scholarly sources claim Yue had a younger brother named Yue Fan (岳翻). He later served in the army under his brother and died in battle in 1132.

=== Military record ===
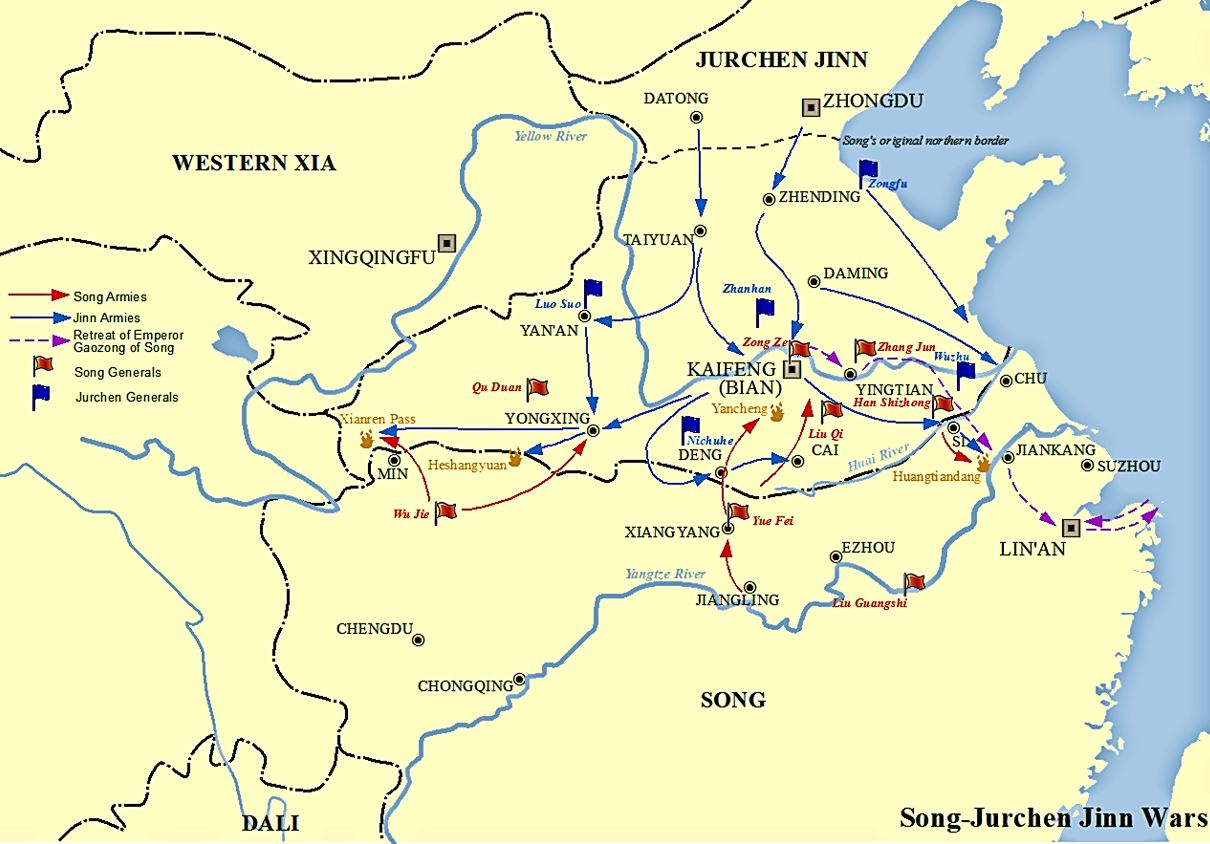
Map showing the Song-Jurchen Jin wars with Yue Fei's northern expedition routes

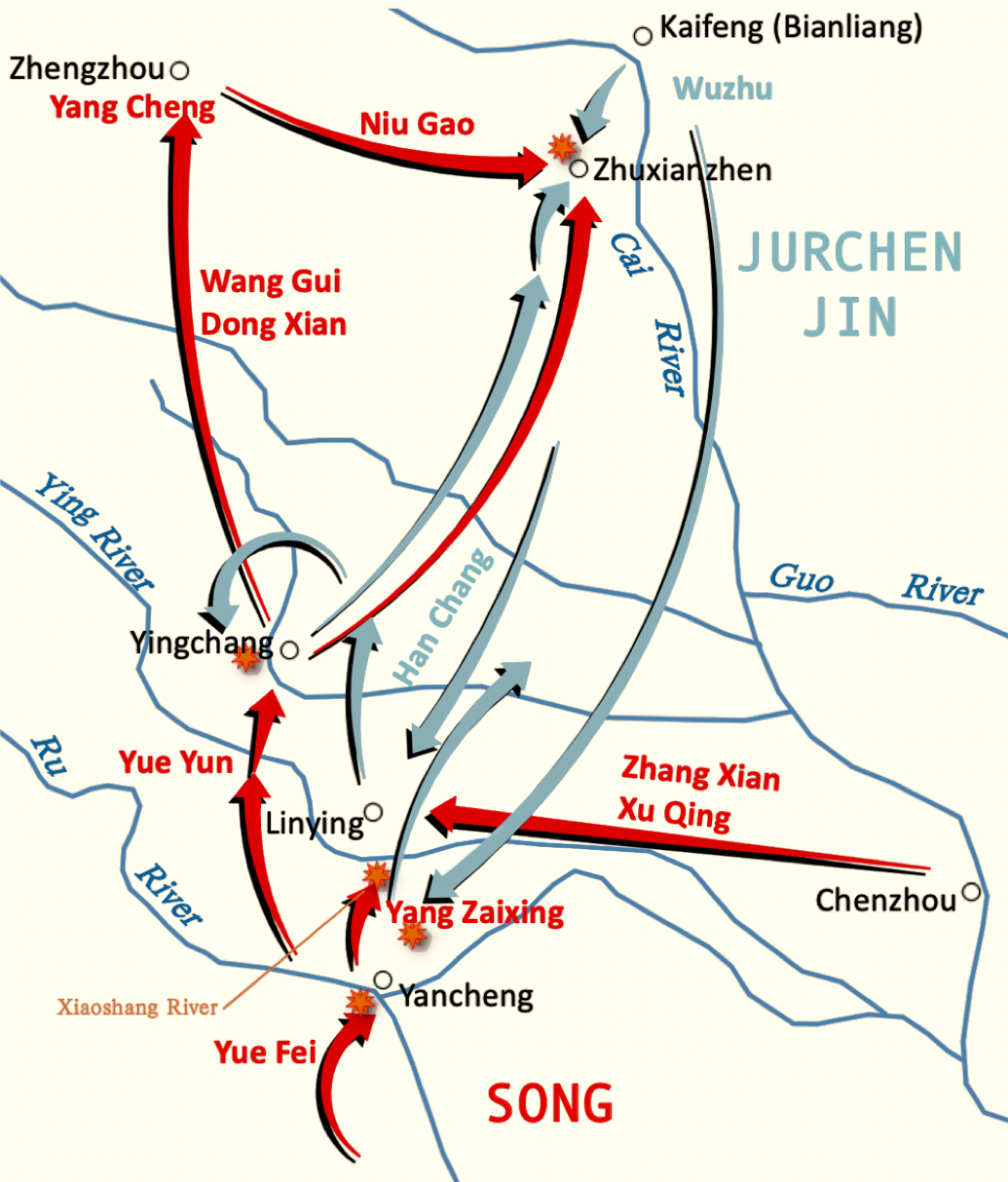
Battles of Yancheng, Yingchang and Zhuxianzhen, which occurred during the last northern expedition led by Yue Fei

The son of an impoverished farmer from northern China, Yue Fei joined the Song military in 1122. Yue briefly left the army when his father died in 1123, but returned in 1126. After reenlisting, he fought to suppress rebellions by local Chinese warlords responsible for looting in northern China. Local uprisings had diverted needed resources away from the Song's war against the Jin. Yue participated in defending Kaifeng during the second siege of the city by the Jin in 1127. After Kaifeng fell, he joined an army in Jiankang tasked with defending the Yangtze. This army prevented the Jurchens from advancing to the river in 1129. His rising reputation as a military leader attracted the attention of the Song court. In 1133, he was made the general of the largest army near the Central Yangtze. Between 1134 and 1135, he led a counteroffensive against Qi, a puppet state supported by the Jin, and secured territories that had been conquered by the Jurchens. He continued to advance in rank, and to increase the size of his army as he repeatedly led successful offensives into northern China. Several other generals were also successful against the Jin dynasty, and their combined efforts secured the survival of the Song dynasty. Yue, like most of them, was committed to recapturing northern China.

Stone Lake: The Poetry of Fan Chengda 1126–1193 states, "...Yue Fei ([1103]-1141)...repelled the enemy assaults in 1133 and 1134, until in 1135 the now confident Song army was in a position to recover all of north China from the Jin dynasty ... [In 1140,] Yue Fei initiated a general counterattack against the Jin armies, defeating one enemy after another until he set up camp within range of the Northern Song dynasty's old capital city, Kaifeng, in preparation for the final assault against the enemy. Yet in the same year Qin [Hui] ordered Yue Fei to abandon his campaign, and in 1141 Yue Fei was summoned back to the Southern Song capital. It is believed that the emperor then ordered Yue Fei to be hanged."

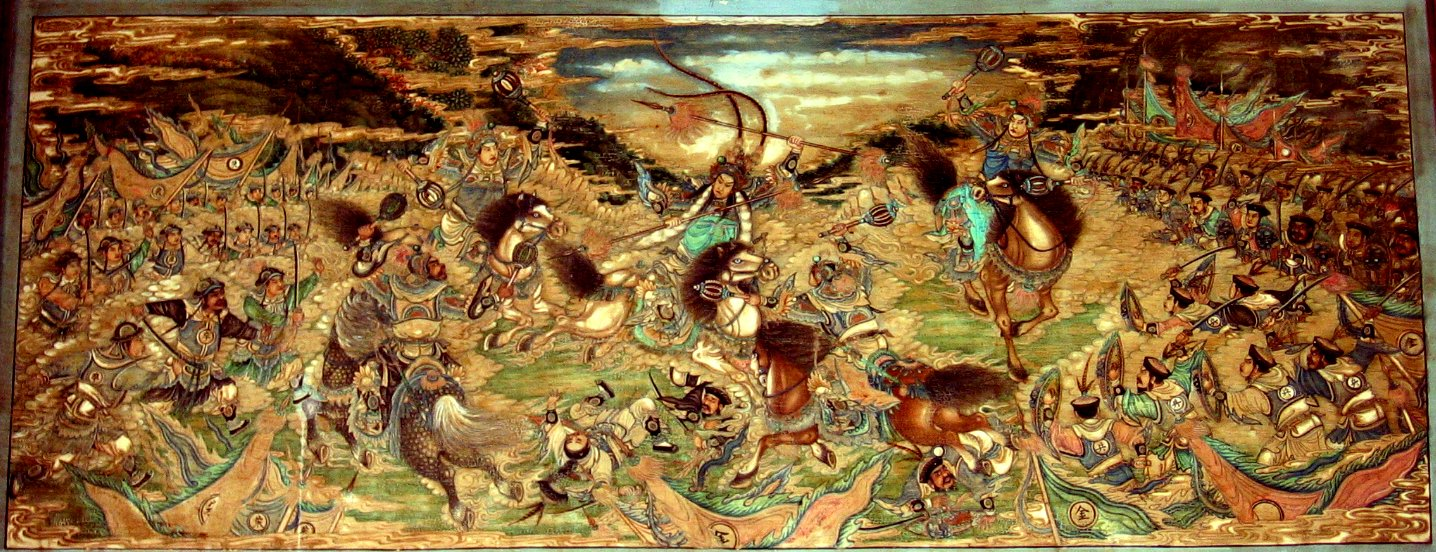
Battle of Zhuxianzhen near Kaifeng in Henan where Yue Fei defeated the Jin army in 1140. Painting on the Long Corridor of the Summer Palace in Beijing.

==== Six methods for deploying an army ====
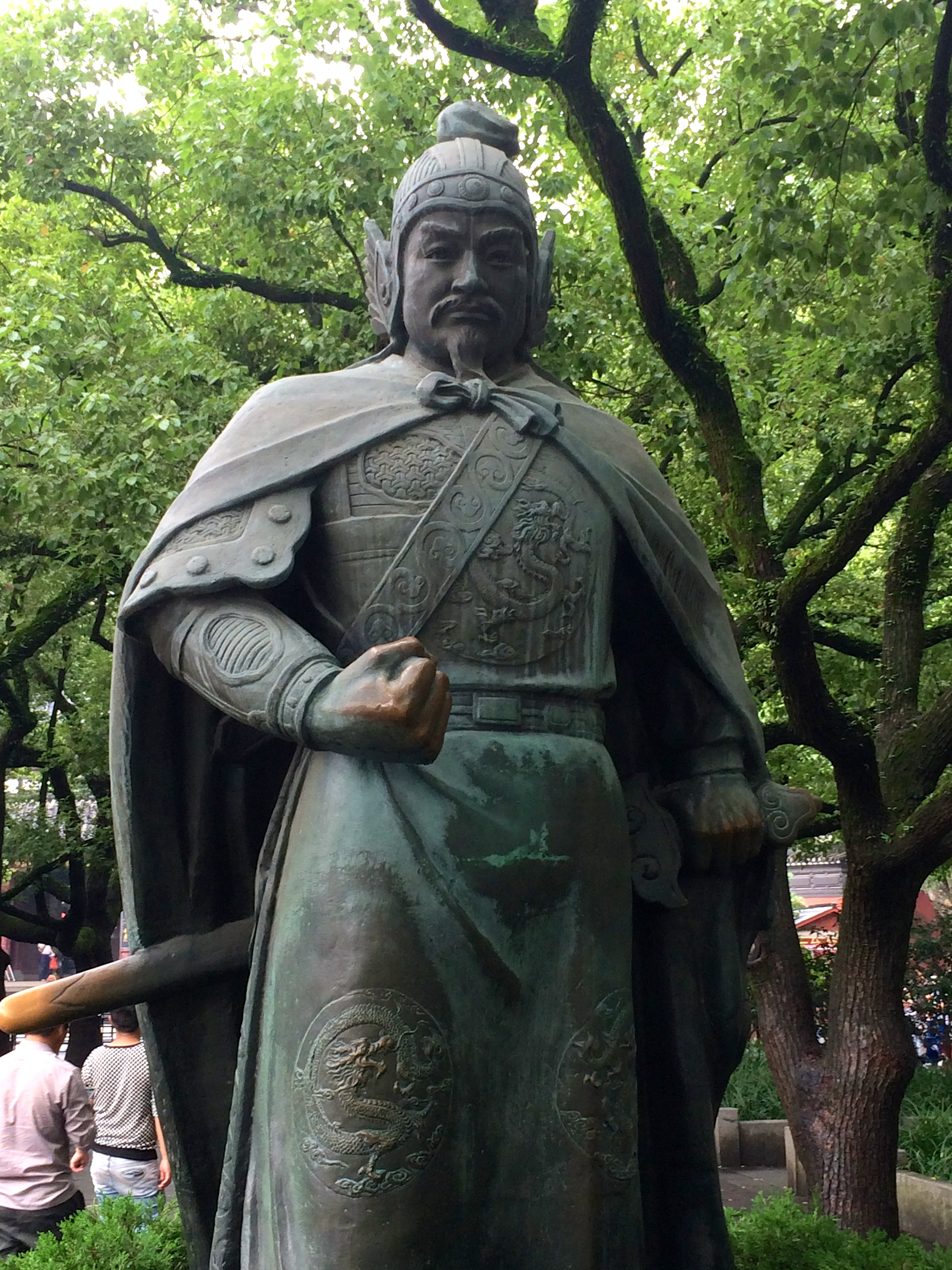
Yue Fei's statue outside the Yue Fei Temple in Hangzhou

Yue Ke (岳珂) states his grandfather had six special methods for deploying an army effectively:

Careful selection
He relied more on small numbers of well-trained soldiers than he did large masses of the poorly trained variety. In this way, one superior soldier counted for as much as one hundred inferior soldiers. One example used to illustrate this was when the armies of Han Ching and Wu Xu were transferred into Yue's camp. Most of them had never seen battle and were generally too old or unhealthy for sustaining prolonged troop movement and engagement of the enemy. Once Yue had filtered out the weak soldiers and sent them home, he was only left with a meager thousand able-bodied soldiers. However, after some months of intense training, they were ready to perform almost as well as the soldiers who had served under Yue for years.

Careful training
When his troops were not on military campaigns to win back lost Chinese territory in the north, Yue put his men through intense training. Apart from troop movement and weapons drills, this training also involved them leaping over walls and crawling through moats in full battle garb. The intensity of the training was such that the men would not even try to visit their families if they passed by their homes while on movement and even trained on their days off.

Justice in rewards and punishments
He rewarded his men for their merits and punished them for their boasting or lack of training. Yue once gave a foot soldier his own personal belt, silver dinner ware, and a promotion for his meritorious deeds in battle. While on the reverse, he once ordered his son Yue Yun to be decapitated for falling off his horse after failing to jump a moat. His son was only saved after Yue's officers begged his mercy. There were a number of soldiers that were either dismissed or executed because they boasted of their skills or failed to follow orders.

Clear orders
He always delivered his orders in a simple manner that was easy for all of his soldiers to understand. Whoever failed to follow them were severely punished.

Strict discipline
While marching about the countryside, he never let his troops destroy fields or to pillage towns or villages. He made them pay a fair price for goods and made sure crops remained intact. A soldier once stole a hemp rope from a peasant so he could tie a bale of hay with it. When Yue discovered this, he questioned the soldier and had him executed.

Close fellowship with his men
He treated all of his men like equals. He ate the same food as they did and slept out in the open as they did. Even when a temporary shelter was erected for him, he made sure several soldiers could find room to sleep inside before he found a spot of his own. When there was not enough wine to go around, he would dilute it with water so every soldier would receive a portion.

== Death ==
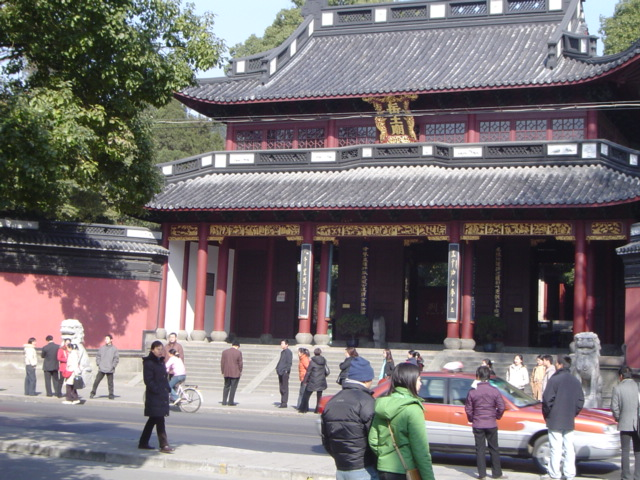
Main gate of the Yue Fei Temple in Hangzhou

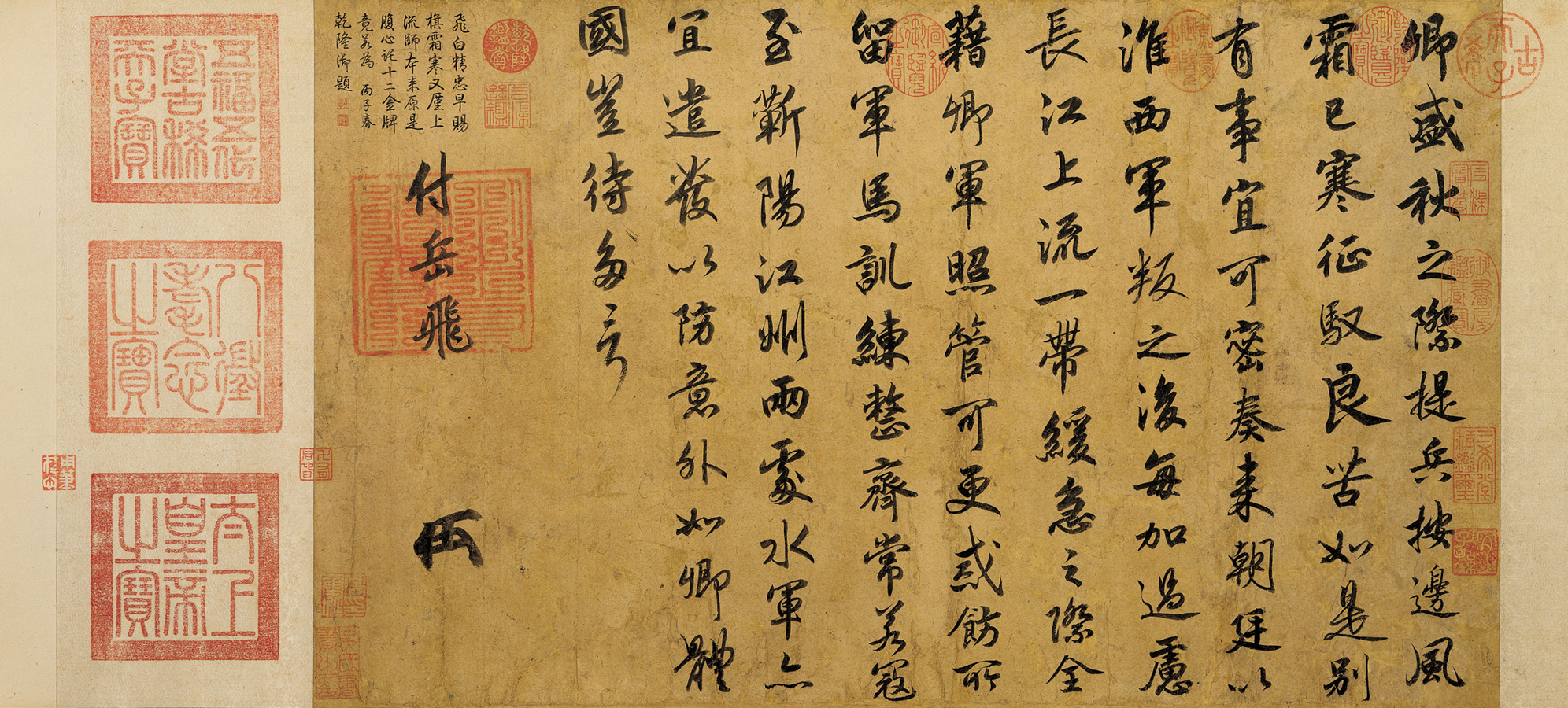
Imperial Order to General Yue Fei (《賜岳飛手勅》), Emperor Gaozong of Song, National Palace Museum, Taipei

In 1126, several years before Yue became a general, the Jurchen-ruled Jin dynasty invaded northern China, forcing the Song dynasty out of its capital Kaifeng and capturing Emperor Qinzong of Song, who was sent into captivity in Huining Prefecture. This marked the end of the Northern Song dynasty, and the beginning of the Southern Song dynasty under Emperor Gaozong.

Yue fought a long campaign against the invading Jurchen in an effort to retake northern China. Just as he was threatening to attack and retake Kaifeng, officials advised Emperor Gaozong to recall Yue to the capital and sue for peace with the Jurchen. Fearing that a defeat at Kaifeng might cause the Jurchen to release Emperor Qinzong, threatening his claim to the throne, Emperor Gaozong followed their advice, sending 12 orders in the form of 12 gold plaques to Yue Fei, recalling him back to the capital. Knowing that a success at Kaifeng could lead to internal strife, Yue submitted to the emperor's orders and returned to the capital, where he was imprisoned and where Qin Hui would eventually arrange for him to be executed on false charges.

There are conflicting views on how Yue died. According to The History of China: (The Greenwood Histories of the Modern Nations) and other sources, Yue died in prison. The Chronicle of Yue, Prince of E of Song says he was killed in prison. Shuo Yue Quanzhuan states he was strangled to death. It reads, "...[Yue Fei] strode in long steps to the Pavilion of Winds and Waves ... The warders on both sides picked up the ropes and strangled the three men [Yue Fei, Yue Yun, and Zhang Xian (張憲), Yue's subordinate] without further ado ... At the time Lord Yue was 39 years of age and the young lord Yue Yun 23. When the three men returned to Heaven, suddenly a fierce wind rose up wildly and all the fires and lights were extinguished. Black mists filled the sky and sand and pebbles were blown about."

The Secrets of Eagle Claw Kung Fu: Ying Jow Pai comments, "Finally, [Yue Fei] received the 'Twelfth Golden Edict' [from the emperor calling him back to the capital], which if ignored meant banishment. Patriotism demanded that he obey. On his way back to the capital he stopped to rest at a pavilion. Qin Hui anticipated Yue Fei's route and sent some men to lie in wait. When Yue Fei arrived, Qin's men ambushed and murdered him. Just 39 years old, Yue Fei like many good men in history, had a swift, brilliant career, then died brutally while still young."

According to A Chinese Biographical Dictionary, "[Father and son] had not been two months in confinement when Qin Hui resolved to rid himself of his enemy. He wrote out with his own hand an order for the execution of Yue Fei, which was forthwith carried into effect; whereupon he immediate reported that Yue Fei had died in prison", which meant that Qin Hui had Yue and his son executed but reported they both died in captivity.

Other sources say he was poisoned to death. Still, a great number simply say he was executed, murdered, or "treacherously assassinated".

After Yue's execution, a prison officer, Wei Shun (隗順), who admired Yue's character, stole his body and secretly buried it at the Nine Song Cong Temple (九曲叢祠) located outside the Song capital.

=== Qin Hui's posthumous punishment ===
Shuo Yue Quanzhuan states after having Yue Fei, Yue Yun, Zhang Xian arrested under false charges, Qin Hui and his wife, Lady Wang (王氏), were sitting by the "eastern window", warming themselves by the fire, when he received a letter from the people calling for the release of Yue Fei. Qin was worried because after nearly two months of torture, he could not get Yue to admit to treason and would eventually have to let him go. However, after a servant girl brought fresh oranges into the room, Lady Wang devised a plan to execute Yue. She told Qin to slip an execution notice inside the skin of an orange and send it to the judge presiding over Yue's case. This way, Yue and his companions would be put to death before the emperor or Qin himself would have to rescind an open order of execution. This conspiracy became known as the "East Window Plot". A novel about this incident, titled Dong Chuang Ji (東窗記; "Tale of the Eastern Window"), was written during the Ming dynasty by an anonymous writer.

When confronted by Han Shizhong on what crime Yue had committed, Qin Hui replied, "Though it isn't sure whether there is something that he did to betray the dynasty, maybe there is." The phrase "perhaps there is", "no reason needed", "groundless", or "baseless" (莫須有, mòxūyǒu) has entered the Chinese language as a proverb to refer to fabricated charges, which also means 'trumped-up charge', 'setup', 'frameup', or 'concocted charge' in English.

Decades later, his grandson, Yue Ke (岳珂), had retrieved documentary evidence of his grandfather's achievements, and published an adulatory biography of him. In 1162 Emperor Xiaozong of Song posthumously dissolved his unjust charges and rehabilitated his honours. For their part in Yue's death, iron statues of Qin Hui, Lady Wang, and two of Qin's subordinates, Moqi Xie (万俟卨) and Zhang Jun (張俊), were made to kneel before Yue Fei's tomb near West Lake in Hangzhou. For centuries, these statues were cursed, spat on, and urinated upon by people. The original castings in bronze were damaged, but later were replaced by images cast in iron, but these were similarly damaged. However now, in modern times, these statues are protected as historical relics. There is a poem hanging on the gate surrounding the statues that reads, "The green hill is fortunate to be the burial ground of a loyal general, the white iron was innocent to be cast into the statues of traitors." Emperor Xiaozong's court gave proper burial to his remains after Wei Shun's family revealed its location; Wei Shun was then posthumously honored at Yue Fei's hometown at Tangyin County, and a statue of him was made standing at its Yue Fei Temple. A [tomb] was put up in his memory, and he was designated Wumu (武穆; "Martial and Stern"). In 1179 he was canonized as Zhongwu (忠武; "Loyal and Martial").

According to the novel Xi You Bu, a satire of Journey to the West, written in 1641 by the scholar Dong Ruoyu (also known as Dong Yue, 1620–1686), the Monkey King enthusiastically serves in hell as the trial prosecutor of Qin Hui, while Yue Fei becomes the Monkey King's third master (by teaching the latter Confucian methods). At one point, the Monkey King asks the spirit of Yue Fei if he would like to drink Qin's blood, but he politely declined.

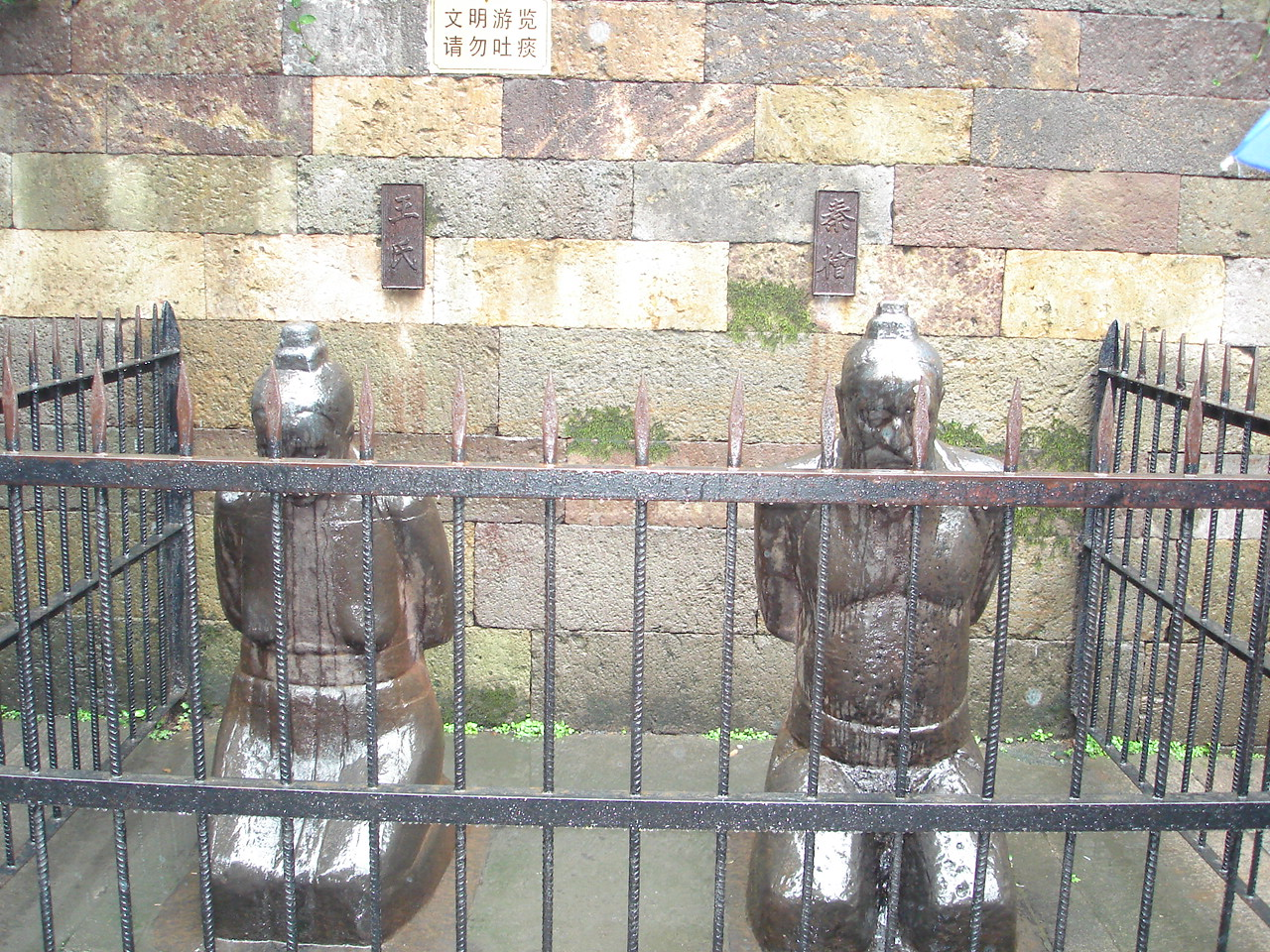
Statues of Lady Wang (秦王氏) and Qin Hui at the Tomb of Yue Fei, Hangzhou

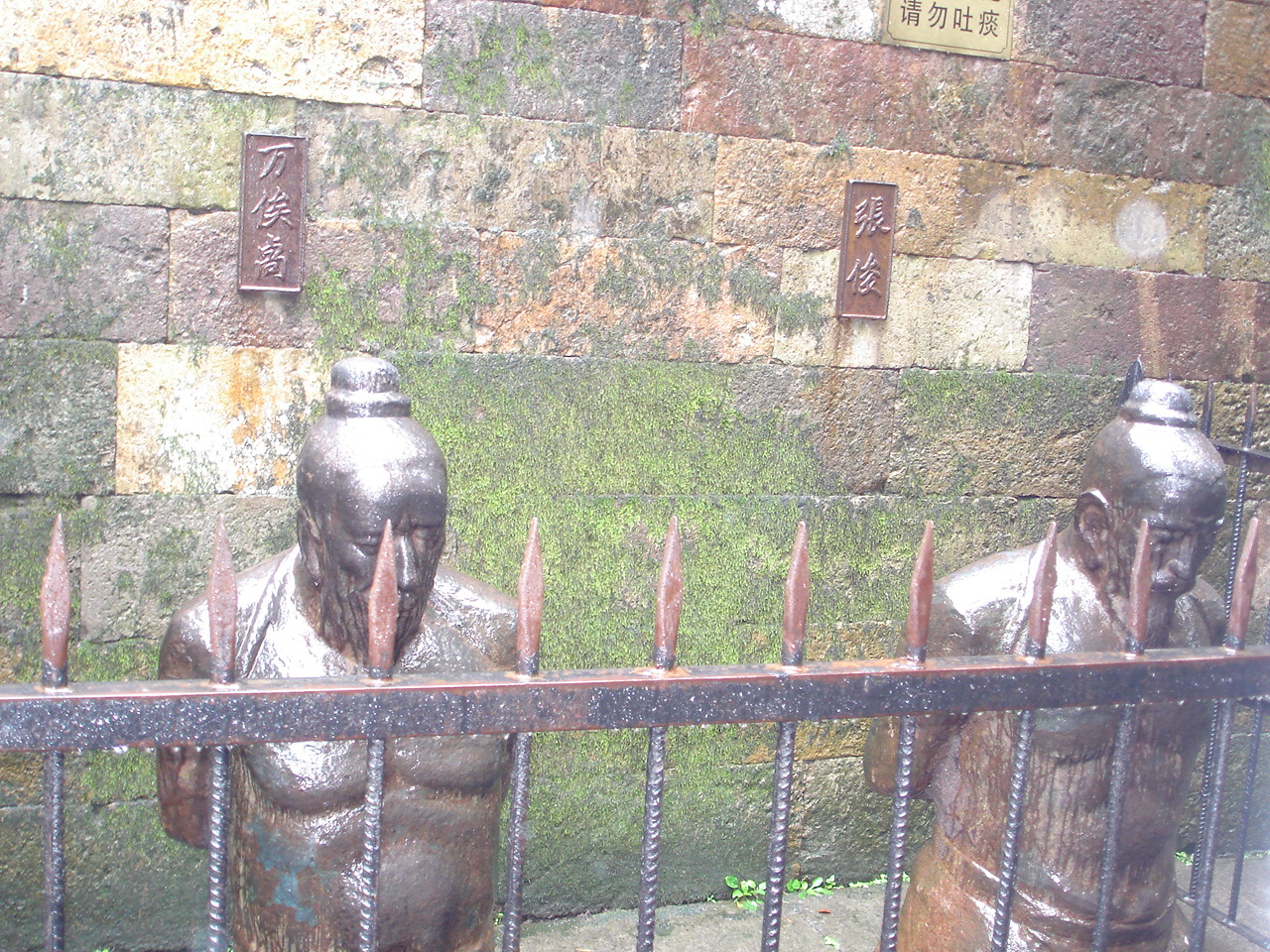
Statues of Moqi Xie (万俟卨) and Zhang Jun at the Tomb of Yue Fei, Hangzhou

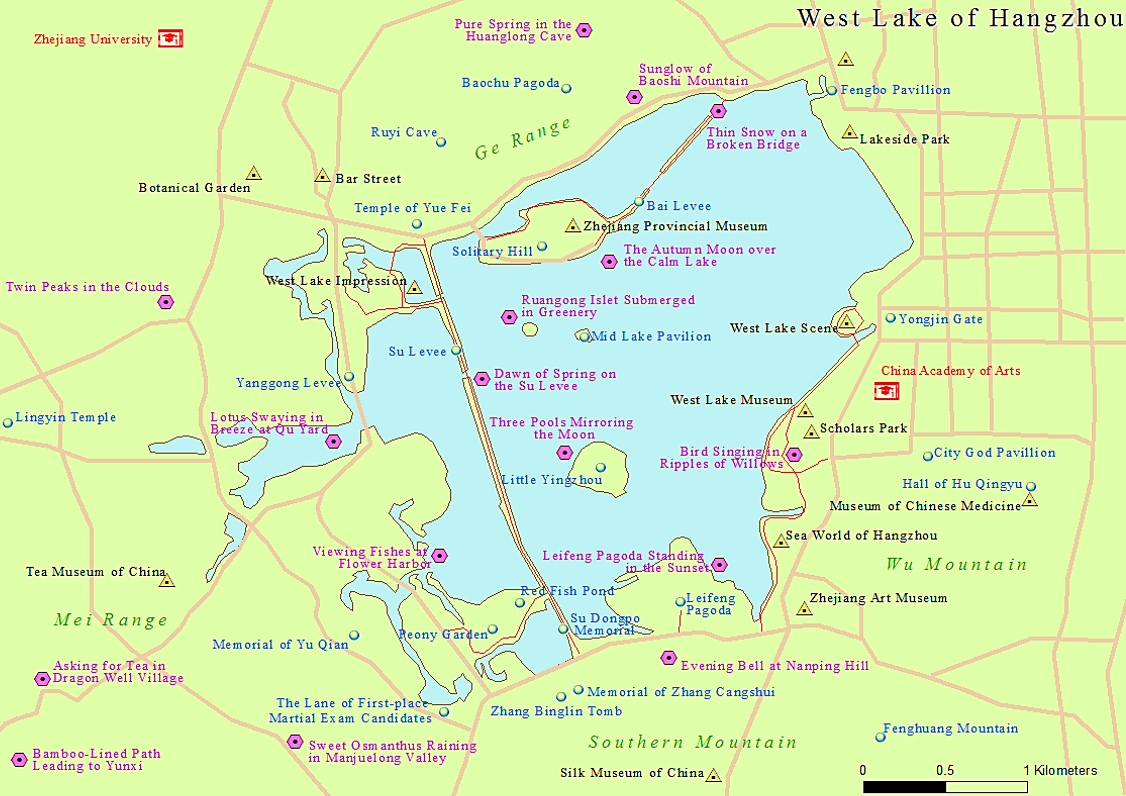
Map of West Lake with the location of the Yue Fei Temple

== Talents ==
=== Martial arts ===
The two styles most associated with Yue are Eagle Claw and xingyiquan. One book states Yue created Eagle Claw for his enlisted soldiers and xingyiquan for his officers. Legend has it that Yue studied in the Shaolin Monastery with a monk named Zhou Tong and learned the "elephant" style of boxing, a set of hand techniques with great emphasis on qinna (joint-locking). Other tales say he learned this style elsewhere outside the temple under the same master. Yue eventually expanded elephant style to create the Yibai Lingba Qinna (一百零八擒拿; "108 Locking Hand Techniques") of the Ying Sao (Eagle Hands) or Ying Kuen (Eagle Fist). After becoming a general in the imperial army, Yue taught this style to his men and they were very successful in battle against the armies of the Jin dynasty. Following his wrongful execution and the disbandment of his armies, Yue's men supposedly traveled all over China spreading the style, which eventually ended right back in Shaolin where it began. Later, a monk named Li Quan (麗泉) combined this style with fanziquan, another style attributed to Yue, to create the modern day form of Northern Ying Jow Pai boxing.

According to legend, Yue combined his knowledge of internal martial arts and spearplay learned from Zhou Tong (in Shaolin) to create the linear fist attacks of xingyiquan. One book claims he studied and synthesized Buddhism's Tendon Changing and Marrow Washing qigong systems to create xingyiquan. On the contrary, proponents of wudangquan believe it is possible that Yue learned the style in the Wudang Mountains that border his home province of Henan. The reasons they cite for this conclusion are that he supposedly lived around the same time and place as Zhang Sanfeng, the founder of tai chi; xingyiquan's five fist attacks, which are based on the Five Chinese Elements theory, are similar to tai chi's "Yin-yang theory"; and both theories are Taoist-based and not Buddhist. The book Henan Orthodox Xingyiquan, written by Pei Xirong (裴锡荣) and Li Ying'ang (李英昂), states xingyiquan master Dai Longbang

... wrote the 'Preface to Six Harmonies Boxing' in the 15th reign year of the Qianlong Emperor [1750]. Inside it says, '... when [Yue Fei] was a child, he received special instructions from Zhou Tong. He became extremely skilled in the spear method. He used the spear to create methods for the fist. He established a method called Yi Quan. Mysterious and unfathomable, followers of old did not have these skills. Throughout the Jin, Yuan and Ming dynasties few had his art. Only Ji Gong had it. (於乾隆十五年為"六合拳"作序云："岳飛當童子時，受業於周侗師，精通槍法，以槍为拳，立法以教將佐，名曰意拳，神妙莫測，盖从古未有之技也。)

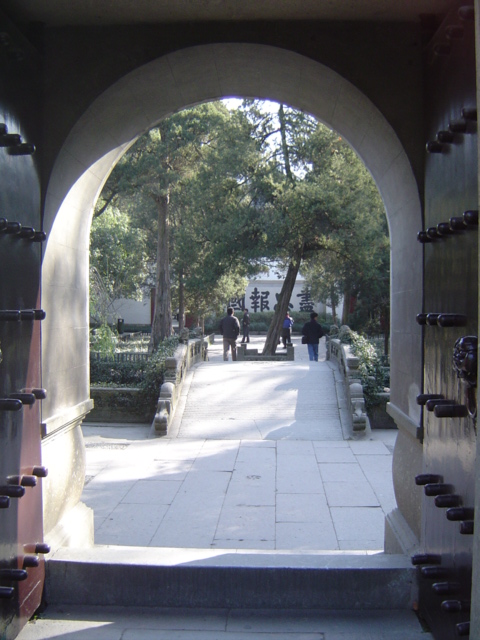
Inside the grounds of Yue Fei's tomb and shrine in Hangzhou; the inscriptions at the far end read "Serve the country with the utmost loyalty".

The man "Ji Gong" mentioned above, better known as Ji Jike (姬際可) or Ji Longfeng (姬隆丰), is said to have trained in Shaolin Monastery for ten years as a young man and was matchless with the spear. As the story goes, he later traveled to Xongju Cave on Mount Zhongnan to receive a boxing manual written by Yue Fei, from which he learned xingyiquan. However, some believe Ji actually created the style himself and attributed it to Yue Fei because he was fighting the Manchus, descendants of the Jurchens who Yue had struggled against. Ji supposedly created it after watching a battle between an eagle and a bear during the Ming dynasty. Other sources say he created it while training in Shaolin. He was reading a book and looked up to see two roosters fighting, which inspired him to imitate the fighting styles of animals. Both versions of the story (eagle / bear and roosters) state he continued to study the actions of animals and eventually increased the cadre of animal forms.

Several other martial arts have been attributed to Yue Fei, including Yuejiaquan (Yue Family Boxing), Fanziquan (Tumbling Boxing), and Chuōjiǎo quan (Feet-Poking Boxing), among others. The "Fanzi Boxing Ballad" says: "Wumu has passed down the Fanziquan which has mystery in its straightforward movements." Wumu (武穆) was a posthumous name given to Yue after his death. One Chuojiao legend states Zhou Tong learned the style from its creator, a wandering Taoist named Deng Liang (鄧良), and later passed it onto Yue Fei, who is considered to be the progenitor of the style.

Besides martial arts, Yue is also said to have studied traditional Chinese medicine. He understood the essence of Hua Tuo's Wu Qin Xi (五禽戲; "Five Animal Frolics") and created his own form of "medical qigong" known as the Ba Duan Jin (八段錦; "Eight Pieces of Brocade"). It is considered a form of Waidan (外丹; "External Elixir") medical qigong. He taught this qigong to his soldiers to help keep their bodies strong and well-prepared for battle. One legend states that Zhou Tong took young Yue to meet a Buddhist hermit who taught him Emei Dapeng Qigong (峨嵋大鵬氣功). His training in Dapeng Qigong was the source of his great strength and martial arts abilities. Modern practitioners of this style say it was passed down by Yue.

==== Connection to Praying Mantis boxing ====
According to Shuo Yue Quanzhuan, Lin Chong and Lu Junyi of the 108 outlaws in Water Margin were former students of Yue's teacher Zhou Tong. One legend states Zhou learned Chuōjiǎo boxing from its originator Deng Liang (鄧良) and then passed it onto Yue Fei, who is sometimes considered the progenitor of the style. Chuojiao is also known as the "Water Margin Outlaw style" and Yuanyang Tui (鴛鴦腿; "Mandarin Duck Leg"). In chapter 29 of Water Margin, titled "Wu Song beats Jiang the Door God in a drunken stupor", it mentions Wu Song, another of Zhou's fictional students, using the "Jade Circle-Steps with Duck and Drake feet". A famous folklore Praying Mantis manuscript, which describes the fictional gathering of eighteen martial arts masters in Shaolin, lists Lin Chong (#13) as a master of "Mandarin ducks kicking technique". This creates a folklore connection between Yue and Mantis boxing.

Lineage Mantis master Yuen Man Kai openly claims Zhou Tong taught Lin Chong and Lu Junyi the "same school" of martial arts that was later combined with the aforementioned seventeen other schools to create Mantis fist. However, he believes Mantis fist was created during the Ming dynasty, and was therefore influenced by these eighteen schools from the Song dynasty. He also says Lu Junyi taught Yan Qing the same martial arts as he learned from Zhou Tong. Yuen further comments that Zhou Tong later taught Yue Fei the same martial art and that Yue was the originator of the mantis move "Black Tiger Stealing [sic] Heart".

=== Poetry ===
At the age of 30, Yue supposedly wrote his most celebrated poem, "Man Jiang Hong" ("Entirely Red River") with a subtitle of "Xie Huai" ("Writing about What I Thought"). This poem reflects the raw hatred he felt towards the Jurchen-ruled Jin dynasty, as well as the sorrow he felt when his efforts to recoup northern lands lost to Jin were halted by Southern Song officials of the "Peace Faction". However, several modern historians, including the late Princeton University Prof. James T. C. Liu, believe certain phrasing in the poem dates its creation to the early 16th century, meaning Yue did not write it.

Yue Fei is also the author of at least two other poems, "Xiao Chong Shan" ("Small Hills") and another "Man Jiang Hong" with a subtitle of "Deng Huang He Lou You Gan" ("My Feelings When I Was Climbing the Yellow Crane Pavilion").

== Descendants ==
Among Yue Fei's descendants was Yue Shenglong (岳昇龍) and his son the Qing dynasty official Yue Zhongqi, who served as Minister of Defence and Governor-General of Shaanxi and Gansu provinces during the reign of the Yongzheng Emperor. Yue Zhongqi conquered Tibet for the Qing during the Dzungar–Qing War and attacked the Dzungars at Ürümqi in Xinjiang. The Oirats were battled against by Yue Zhongqi. Yue Zhongqi lived at the Ji Xiaolan Residence.

Another notable descendant of Yue Fei was Yue Yiqin, a flying ace of the Republic of China during the Second Sino-Japanese War.

In 2011, two Yue descendants, Yue Jun and Yue Haijun, with six members of their clan, protested Jiangning Imperial Silk Manufacturing Museum's Qin Hui statue, which indicates that even after centuries, the Yue family still hates Qin Hui and his conspirators for their ancestor's plight. It has been reported that male members of the Yue family were not allowed to marry anyone whose surname was Qin until 1949, and genealogical records attest that this rule was rarely broken prior to its nullification. In 2017, it was reported that were 1.81 million descendants of Yue Fei in China, and the number of Yue Fei's descendants in Anhui alone has grown to more than 1,003,000.

== Culture hero ==
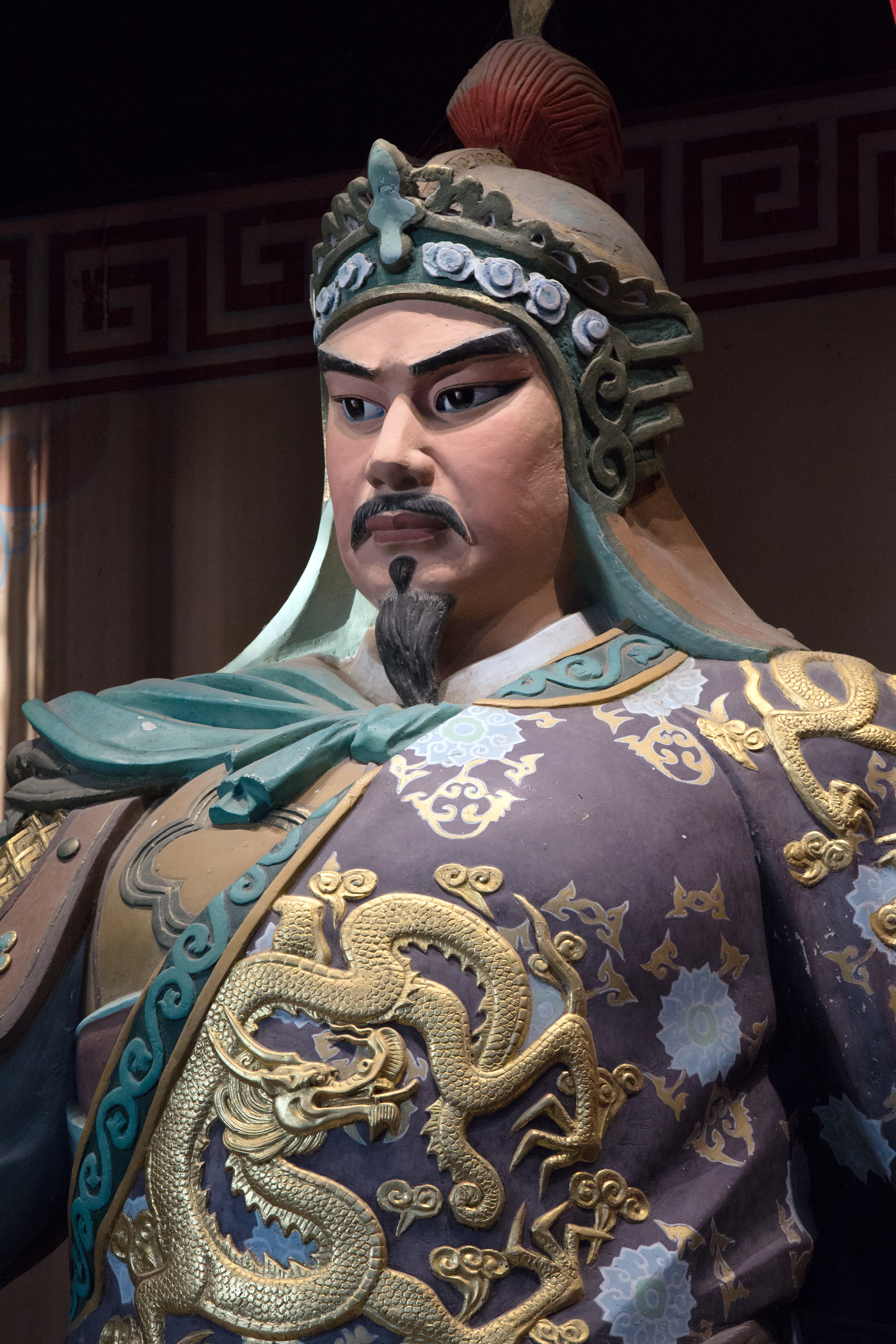
Statue of Yue Fei inside the grounds of Yue Fei's tomb and shrine in Hangzhou

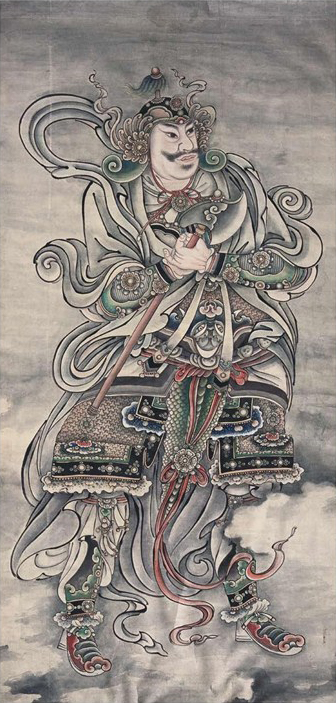
Taoist painting of Yue Fei as the deity "General Yue" (岳元帅), from White Cloud Temple.

Yue Fei's stature in Chinese history rose to that of a national hero after his execution. Qin Hui, and in some cases Emperor Gaozong, were blamed by later historians for their supposed role in Yue Fei's execution and conciliatory stance with the Jin dynasty. The allegations that Qin Hui conspired with the Jin to execute Yue Fei are popular in Chinese literature, but have never been proven. The real Yue Fei differed from the later myths that grew from his exploits. The portrayal of Yue as a scholar-general is only partially true. He was a skilled general, and may have been partially literate in Classical Chinese, but he was not an erudite Confucian scholar. Contrary to traditional legends, Yue was not the sole Chinese general engaged in the offensive against the Jurchens. He was one of many generals that fought against the Jin in northern China, and unlike Yue Fei, some of his peers were genuine members of the scholarly elite. Many of the exaggerations of Yue Fei's life can be traced to a biography written by his grandson, Yue Ke. Yue Fei's status as a culture hero strengthened in the Yuan dynasty and had a large impact on Chinese culture. Temples and shrines devoted to Yue Fei were constructed in the Ming dynasty. A Chinese World War II anthem alludes to lyrics said to have been written by Yue Fei.

He also sometimes appears as a door god in partnership with the deity Wen Taibao.

At certain points in time, Yue Fei ceased to be a national hero, such as in 2002, when the official guidelines for history teachers said that he could no longer carry the title. This was because Yue Fei had defended China from the Jurchen people, whose descendants, the Manchu people, are presently considered to be a part of the Chinese nation. Therefore, concern for the "unity of nationalities" in China prevailed, as Yue Fei was seen as representing only one subgroup within China, and not the "entire Chinese nation as presently defined". However, both the Chinese Ministry of Education and the Minister of Defence deny such claims and still clearly address Yue Fei as a national hero of China. The Chinese Communist Party also continues to treat Yue Fei as a national hero of China.

=== Modern references ===
The ROCS Yueh Fei (FFG-1106), a Cheng Kung-class guided-missile frigate of the Republic of China Navy, is named after Yue.

The author Guy Gavriel Kay cites Yue Fei as having inspired the character Ren Daiyan in his novel River of Stars (ISBN 978-0-670-06840-1), which is set in a fantasy world based on Song Dynasty China.

Yue Fei is one of the 32 historical figures who appear as special characters in the video game Romance of the Three Kingdoms XI by Koei.

Yue Fei is also mentioned as a "Fixer" of great skills in the game Limbus Company.

== See also ==
- Cultural depictions of Yue Fei
- Yue Fei Temple and Tomb
- History of the Song dynasty
- Jin–Song Wars (Timeline)
- Han chauvinism
- Gaozong of Song
- Qin Hui
- Han Shizhong
- Zhang Jun
- Wen Tianxiang
- Lu Xiufu
- Zhang Shijie
- Yuan Chonghuan
