= Monkey (novel) =

Abridged English translation of Journey to the West, a 16th-century Chinese novel

- Whole dust jacket of the first British edition (1942)
- Author: Wu Ch'eng-En
- Original title: Xi You Ji (Journey to the West)
- Translator: Arthur Waley
- Language: English
- Genre: Gods and demons fiction, Chinese mythology, fantasy, novel
- Publisher: Allen and Unwin
- Publication date: 1942 (original release date)
- Publication place: China
- Media type: Print (Hardback & Paperback)
- Pages: 350

Monkey: A Folk-Tale of China, more often known as simply Monkey, is an abridged translation published in 1942 by Arthur Waley of the sixteenth-century Chinese novel Journey to the West (conventionally attributed to Wu Cheng'en of the Ming dynasty). Waley's remains one of the most-read English-language versions of the novel. The British poet Edith Sitwell characterized Monkey as "a masterpiece of right sound", one that was "absence of shadow, like the clearance and directness of Monkey's mind." The translation won the James Tait Black Memorial Prize in 1942.

== Plot ==
Journey to the West may be roughly divided into three parts: first, the introduction including the origin of Monkey (Sun Wukong), Tripitaka (Tang Sanzang), Pigsy (Zhu Bajie), and Sandy (Sha Wujing); second, the actual journey to the west, which has an episodic nature; and last, the ending, telling what happens when the pilgrims reach their destination. Waley chose to translate the entirety of the introductory and ending chapters, as well as three episodes, each several chapters long, of the journey to the west.

At the outset of the novel, the Buddha decides that one of his followers must make a pilgrimage to India to recover lost works that will guide the sinful people of Southern China towards proper practice of Buddhism. The young monk Tripitaka volunteers to undertake the pilgrimage, and willingly frees Monkey, formerly a member of the heavenly court punished for rebellion.

The pair then recruit two other disgraced heavenly courtiers, Pigsy and Sandy. They liberate a captive princess and punish her abductor, who has also murdered her father. The father is resurrected and restored to his rightful place as king. The four pilgrims meet several bodhisattvas, defeat a variety of fearsome monsters and demons, and survive numerous trials. Finally, they reach the Buddha's palace and are honored with wealth and privileges, having attained various states of enlightenment.

== Translation ==
Arthur Waley's abridged translation was published in 1942, and has also been published as Adventures of the Monkey God; and Monkey: [A] Folk Novel of China and The Adventures of Monkey, and in a further abridged version for children, Dear Monkey. Whereas previous abridged versions of Journey to the West retained the original number of chapters but reduced their length significantly, Waley adopted the opposite approach: he translated only 30 chapters out of 100 episodes (about roughly 1/6 of the whole text), and omitting "most of the incidental passages in verse." He is also responsible for inventing the names of the main characters: Sun Wukong as "Monkey", Tang Sanzang as "Tripitaka", Zhu Bajie as "Pigsy", and Sha Wujing as "Sandy".

Anthony C. Yu, the first to translate the full 100-chapter version of 1592, wrote that

Even in this attenuated form, however, Waley's version further deviates from the original by having left out large portions of certain chapters (e.g., 10 and 19). What is most regrettable is that Waley, despite his immense gift for, and magnificent achievements in, the translation of Chinese verse, has elected to ignore the many poems—some 750 of them—that are structured in the narrative. Not only is the fundamental literary form of the work thereby distorted, but also much of the narrative vigor and descriptive power of its language which have attracted generations of Chinese readers is lost.

== Influence ==
Waley's translation was for many years the most popular version of Journey to the West in the English language and therefore cited by Western scholars of Chinese literature. Professor of Chinese literature David Lattimore described it as a "minor landmark of 20th-century English translation" but with the publication of Anthony C. Yu's four-volume, unabridged translation it must now "relinquish its always slender claim to represent, with any degree of substantiality, the Chinese original". In 2000, Elaine Yee Lin Ho, in her study of the British writer Timothy Mo, says Monkey remains "the most popular and textually accessible translation" of Journey to the West.

The literary scholar Andrew H. Plaks said Waley not only shortened the work, but "through its selection of episodes gave rise to the misleading impression that this is essentially a compendium of popular materials marked by folk wit and humor." In this, Waley followed an interpretation from earlier in the century by the scholar Hu Shih, who wrote an introduction to the 1943 edition of Waley's book. Hu scorned the allegorical interpretations of the novel as old-fashioned and instead insisted that the stories were simply comic. Hu Shih reflected the popular reading of the novel, but he did not account for the levels of meaning and allegorical framework that scholars considered to be an important part.

Monkey was also translated into other languages, including Swedish as Kung Markatta (1949).

Monkey is said to have been the inspiration for Cordwainer Smith's epic novel Norstrilia.

== Cancelled film ==
In 1985, Pixar, while under Lucasfilm, made plans to produce a film adaptation of the novel, long before Toy Story (1995). The film was to be made in conjunction with the Japanese company Shogakukan, owners of the publishing company Shueisha, who published the Shonen Jump series Dragon Ball. A year later, after NeXT acquired Pixar, Steve Jobs cancelled the project once it became apparent the technology was not sufficiently advanced and Shogakukan backed out.

== References and further reading ==
- Yu, Anthony C. (2012). "Introduction". Journey to the West. Vol. 1. Chicago: University of Chicago Press. pp. 1–96.
- ——— (2012). "Preface to the First Edition". Journey to the West. Vol. 1. Chicago: University of Chicago Press. pp. xiii–xv.
- Ji, Hao (2016). "A Comparative Study of Two Major English Translations of the Journey to the West: Monkey and The Monkey and the Monk". Journal of Chinese Humanities. 2 (1). Leiden: Brill: 77–97. doi:10.1163/23521341-12340027. Full Access
