= A Supplement to the Journey to the West =

Addendum to Journey to the West

- An illustration from the Chongzhen edition of the novel
- Author: Dong Yue (董說)
- Original title: Xiyoubu (西遊補)
- Translator: Shuen-fu Lin and Larry James Schulz (English edition)
- Language: Chinese
- Genre: Adventure, Shenmo, Fantasy
- Publication date: 1641
- Publication place: China
- English publication date: 1978; 2020
- Pages: 200 (1978 translation); 278 (2020 translation)
- ISBN: 978-0895815019 (English edition)
- OCLC: 716134066
- Preceded by: Journey to the West

A Supplement to the Journey to the West (Note: simplified Chinese: 西游补; traditional Chinese: 西遊補; pinyin: Xī Yóu Bǔ; Wade–Giles: Hsi-yu pu) is a Chinese shenmo (fantastic) novel written around 1640 AD by Dong Yue. (Note: simplified Chinese: 董说; traditional Chinese: 董說; pinyin: Dǒng Yuè) It acts as an addendum to the famous 16th century novel Journey to the West and takes place between chapters 61 and 62. The novel contains 16 chapters.

In the story, the Monkey King is trapped in a dream world by the Qing Fish demon, an embodiment of desire, who wishes to eat his master, the Tang Sanzang. He wanders from one adventure to the next, using a magic tower of mirrors and a jade doorway to travel to different points in time. In the Qin dynasty, he disguises himself as Consort Yu (Xiang Yu's wife) in order to locate a magic weapon needed for his quest to India. During the Song dynasty, he serves in place of King Yama as the judge of Hell. After returning to the Tang dynasty, he finds that Tang Sanzang has taken a wife and become a general charged with wiping out desire. In the end, Monkey unwillingly participates in a great war between all the kingdoms of the world, during which time he faces one of his own sons on the battlefield. He eventually awakens in time to kill the demon, thus freeing himself of desire.

At the end of the novel, the author lists twelve hypothetical questions that a reader might ask and answers them. For instance, he explains that the reason he wrote the Supplement is because he wanted Monkey to face an opponent—in this case desire—that he could not defeat with his great strength. He also explains why he waited to reveal the monster at the end of the novel, why Monkey serves as King Yama, and the peculiarities of time travel in the dream world.

There is a debate between scholars over when the book was actually published. One school of thought favors a political interpretation which lends itself to a later publication after the founding of the Qing dynasty (1644–1911). The second favors a religious interpretation which lends itself to an earlier publication during the late Ming dynasty (1368–1644). Evidence in favor of the former includes references to the stench of nearby “Tartars,” a possible allusion to the Manchus who would eventually found the Qing dynasty of China. Evidence in favor of the latter includes references to Buddhist sutras and the suppression of desire and the lack of political statements “lament[ing] the fate of the country.” The novel can ultimately be linked to the Ming because a mid-17th century poem dates it to the year 1640.

The novel draws heavily from Yuan and Ming dynasty tales, including the literary ancestor of the Romance of the Three Kingdoms. Modern literary critics also noted the novel's use of stream of consciousness technique as innovative and trailblazing.

== Plot ==
Title page of the novel from a 1641 edition

During the battle with the Rakshasi Lady Iron Fan, Monkey transforms into an insect and enters her stomach. He forces her to give him the magic fan that he needs to quell the heavenly fire of the Flaming Mountain blocking their path to India. However, while he is in her stomach he becomes aroused with passion. This becomes a chink in Monkey's emotional and spiritual armor as he is otherwise without weakness. It is months after the pilgrims bypass the mountain that he falls prey to the magic of the Qing Fish demon, an embodiment of desire. The demon uses its powers of illusion to trap him in a dream world so nothing will keep it from eating the Tang Priest. The story from this point reads disjointedly as the dream world does not adhere to the rules of the physical world.

While on a mission to find food, Monkey comes upon a large city flying the banner “Great Tang’s New Son-of-Heaven, the Restoration Emperor, thirty-eighth successor of Taizong.” This strikes him as odd as it was Taizong who had originally sent them to retrieve the Buddhist scriptures in India. This means that either the pilgrims’ journey has taken hundreds of years, or the city is a fake. He flies to heaven in order to learn more about the Great Tang, but finds that the gates are locked because an imposter Monkey has stolen the Palace of Magic Mists.

The situation becomes stranger when he returns to the city and learns that the king has sent someone to invite the Tang Priest to become a general of his military. But when Monkey tries to intercept the messenger, the person is nowhere to be found, and he instead comes upon mortal men flying on magic clouds picking at the foundations of heaven with spears and axes. From them he learns that Little Moon King (小月王), the ruler of the neighboring Kingdom of Great Compassion, has put up a great bronze wall and a fine mesh netting to block Monkey's path to India. But because he feels sorry for the Tang Priest, the Little Moon King forced the men to dig a hole in the firmament of heaven so that Tang Sanzang could hop from the Daoist heaven to the Buddhist heaven to complete his mission. In the process, the men accidentally caused the Palace of Magic Mists to fall through to earth (the reason heaven blamed it on him).

Monkey goes to the Emerald Green World, Little Moon King's imperial city, to fetch his master, but is blocked from entering once inside the main gate. When he uses his great strength to break open the wall, he falls into a magic tower of mirrors, gateways to different points in history and other universes. Monkey travels to the “World of the Ancients” (the Qin dynasty) by drilling through a bronze mirror. He disguises himself as Beautiful Lady Yu, concubine of King Xiang Yu of Chu, in order to retrieve a magic “Mountain-removing Bell” from the first Qin Emperor so that he can use it to clear the group's path to India of any obstacles blocking their way. But Monkey later learns that the Jade Emperor had banished the emperor to the “World of Oblivion,” which lies beyond the “World of the Future.” Xiang Yu takes him to a village housing a set of Jade gates that lead to the World of the Future. Monkey leaps through and travels hundreds of years forward in time to the Song dynasty.

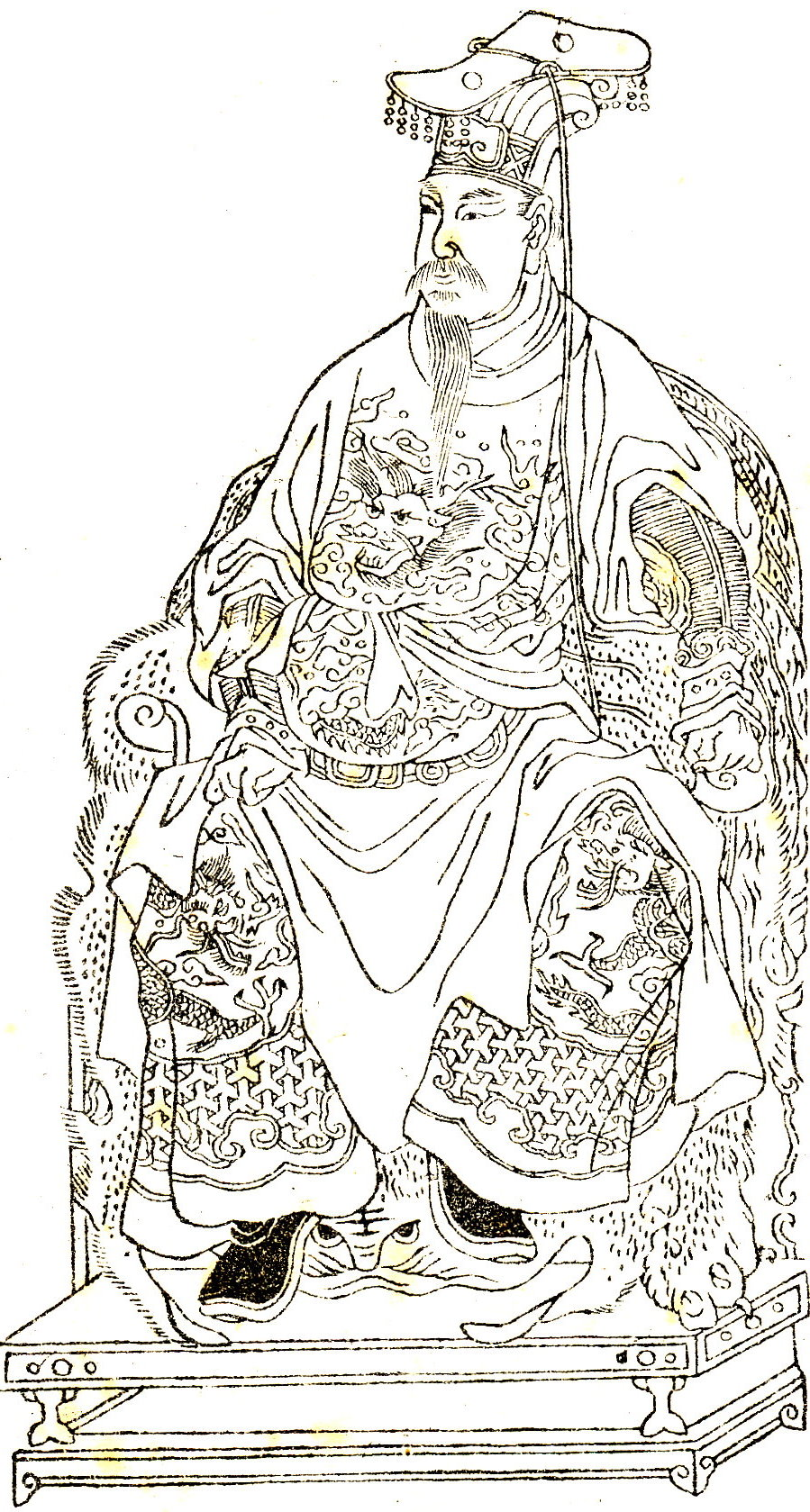
An idealized woodblock print of Yue Fei wearing imperial garb.

After resuming his normal form, some junior devils appear and tell him that King Yama has recently died of an illness and that Monkey must take his place as judge of the dead until a suitable replacement can be found. He ends up judging the fate of the recently deceased Prime Minister Qin Hui. Monkey puts Qin through a series of horrific tortures, after which a demon uses its magic breath to blow his broken body back into its proper form. He finally sends a demon to heaven to retrieve a powerful magic gourd that sucks anyone who speaks before it inside and melts them down into a bloody stew. He uses this for Qin's final punishment. Meanwhile, Monkey invites the ghost of Qin's victim Yue Fei to the underworld and takes him as his third master. (Note: He claims this completes his lessons on the three religions since: 1) the immortal Subhodhi taught him Daoist magic; 2) the Tang Priest taught him Buddhist restraint; and 3) Yue Fei taught him Confucian ideals (Dong & Wu 2000, p. 80).) He entertains Yue until Qin has been reduced to liquid and offers the general a cup of the Prime Minister's "blood wine." Yue, however, refuses on the grounds that drinking it would sully his soul. Monkey then does an experiment where he makes a junior devil drink of the wine. Sometime later, the devil, apparently under the evil influence of the blood wine, murders his personal religious teacher and escapes into the "gate of ghosts," presumably being reborn into another existence. Yue Fei then takes his leave to return to his heavenly abode. Monkey sends him off with a huge display of respect by making all of the millions of denizens of the underworld kowtow before him.

After leaving the underworld, Monkey is able to return to the tower of mirrors with the help of the New Ancient, a man who had been trapped in the World of the Future for centuries. However, when he tries to leave the tower through a window, Monkey becomes entangled by red threads (a representation of desire). He becomes so worried that his own spirit leaves his body and, in the guise of an old man, snaps the threads. He later discovers from a local Daoist immortal that the Qin Emperor has loaned the Mountain-removing Bell to the founder of the Han dynasty, his former enemy. In addition, he learns that the Tang Priest has given up the journey to India, dismissed his other disciples Pigsy and Friar Sand, taken a wife, and accepted the position as a general of the imposter Great Tang's military. Tang Sanzang begins to amass a huge army to fight the forces of desire led by King Paramita (Perfection), one of Monkey's five sons born to Lady Iron Fan. Monkey is eventually made a junior general and faces his son in battle. Confusion sets in causing the clashing armies to attack both friend and foe. This shock causes Monkey to slowly wake from the dream.

Somewhere between the dream world and the world of reality, he learns from the disembodied Master of the Void that he has been bewitched by the Qing Fish demon. Monkey and the Qing Fish have a connection because they were born at the same time from the same primordial energies at the beginning of time. The only difference is that Monkey's positive Yang energy is offset by the demon's far more powerful negative Yin energy. The demon is in effect the physical embodiment of Monkey's desires. When he finally awakens, having dreamed the entire adventure in only a few seconds, he discovers that the demon has infiltrated the Tang Priest's retinue by taking on the form of a young and beautiful Buddhist monk. Monkey instantly kills him with his iron cudgel, thereby killing his desire. He explains everything that has transpired, and the Tang Priest commends him for his great effort.

== Questions and answers ==
Another illustration from the Chongzhen edition of the novel

At the end of the novel, the author lists twelve hypothetical questions that a reader might ask and answers them. Some of the answers are very similar in nature and, sometimes, contradictory.

The first question asks whether a supplement was even necessary since the original novel did not seem to be incomplete. He explains that it was written so Monkey would face an enemy—in this case desire—that he could not defeat with his great strength. By experiencing desire he learns to separate himself from it, thus helping to bring about true enlightenment.

The second asks why he faces a single enemy who tricks him with magic, instead of many who want to eat the Tang Priest. The author answers this question with a quote by the philosopher Mencius: “There is no better way of learning than to seek your own strayed heart.”

The third asks why Dong waited to reveal the monster Monkey faces at the end of the novel, instead of doing so in the title of one of the chapters like in the original. He states that desire is formless and soundless, meaning people can be affected by it without knowing it. Therefore, the Qing fish monster is present throughout the entire book.

The fourth asks how it's possible for the spirit of Qin Hui, who lived during the Song, to be in the Tang dynasty. Dong points out that anything is possible in a dream.

The fifth asks why Monkey becomes the fearsome King Yama in the future. He explains a person who travels to the future must embolden their spirit when facing adversity. By killing the six thieves, (Note: This takes place upon his arrival in the Song Dynasty.) torturing Qin and honoring Yue, Monkey is able to break free of the Qing fish's power.

The sixth asks why the Tang Priest becomes a general. He becomes a general to wipe out the forces of desire.

The seventh indirectly asks why the Tang Priest cries when a young girl plays the pipa. (Note: This takes place just before the Tang Priest accepts the invitation to become a general for the Great Tang.) Dong quotes the Buddhist tenet that sorrow is the source of desire.

The eighth asks how it's possible for Monkey to have a wife and children. He states that the book is simply a dream.

The ninth asks why a chaotic battle erupts between the five armies after Monkey escapes from inside the Qing fish. It's because the accumulation of desire reaches the breaking point. It can be likened to being forced awake during the worst part of a nightmare.

The tenth asks why Monkey is able to escape the dream world just by participating in combat. Dong says combat is how he kills his desire.

The eleventh asks if it's possible to gouge holes in heaven like the flying men do. This is not directly answered. The author states Monkey would not have been able to be trapped inside of the Qing fish without encountering these men.

The twelfth asks why the Qing fish is portrayed as being young and beautiful. Dong explains that these are the qualities that desire has taken from the beginning of time.

== Proposed datings ==
Pages from a 1641 printed edition of the novel

There is a debate between scholars over when the book was actually published. One school of thought favors a political interpretation which lends itself to a later publication after the founding of the Qing dynasty (1644–1911). The second favors a religious interpretation which lends itself to an earlier publication during the late Ming dynasty (1368–1644).

Proponents of the political interpretation take the qing (情, desire) of the Qing fish to be an allusion to the qing (清, pure) of the Qing dynasty (清朝). (Note: The only difference between the two Qings is the type of Chinese radical located on the left of each character. The Qing of desire (情) has the radical for heart (心, xin), while the character for the Imperial Qing (清) has the radical for water (水, shui). Both characters contain the core character green (青, qing).) The English translators of the book, who appear neutral in the debate, point out three things that may support this view: First, the reason Dong included Qin Hui in the story may have been because the Prime Minister historically betrayed the Song to the Jurchen-ruled Jin dynasty. Centuries later, the Manchu chieftain Nurhachi, an ancestor of the Jurchens, founded the Later Jin dynasty in 1616. This dynasty was later renamed the Qing Dynasty in 1636. So even if the book was published prior to the fall of the Ming dynasty in 1644, the Qing fish may indeed been meant as an analogy for the Qing. Second, Monkey is offended by an odor created by Tartars “right next door.” Since the Manchus resided “next door” to northern China, the idea of an invasion may have been on Dong's mind while he was writing the book. Third, Dong may have been ridiculing the Ming's inaction towards an imminent Manchu invasion when the New Ancient tells Monkey that his body will take on the stink of the barbarians if he stays too long. Proponents who favor the political interpretation include the scholars Xu Fuming and Liu Dajie.

Proponents of the religious interpretation prefer to take the Qing fish for what it is, an embodiment of desire. The author Dong Yue is known to have been alienated by Buddhism's denigration of desire, and so the Tang Priest's position as the General of “Qing-killing” is simply a satire aimed at the religion. Madeline Chu believes the constant repetition of the color green (青, qing)—green cities, green towers, green robes, etc.—is an analogy for human emotions. She also points out that the Chinese characters used to spell Little Moon King (小月王) are visually similar to the three that comprise desire (情). (Note: The three component characters in desire (情) look like xin (心, heart), sheng (生, birth), and yue (月, moon).) The English translators note that the physical Tower of Myriad Mirrors recalls a tale from the Buddhist Avatamsaka Sutra in which the Bodhisattva Maitreya creates a self-contained universe inside of a tower in order to bring about the enlightenment of Guanyin's disciple Sudhana. Therefore, Monkey is just like Sudhana because the events he experiences inside of the tower eventually lead to his enlightenment.

There are other reasons to accept a Ming publication. The scholar Lu Xun muses, “Actually the book contains more digs at Ming fashions than laments over the fate of the country, and I suspect that it was written before the end of the [Ming] dynasty." Most importantly, there is a woodblock edition of the novel that was printed during the 1628-1644 reign of the Chongzhen Emperor. The preface is dated to the year xinsi, which Madeline Chu believes to be the year 1641. Additionally, a note appearing in the poem “Random Thoughts” (1650) comments that the author Dong Yue “supplemented the Xiyouji ten years ago”, which dates the writing of the novel to 1640.

== Influences ==
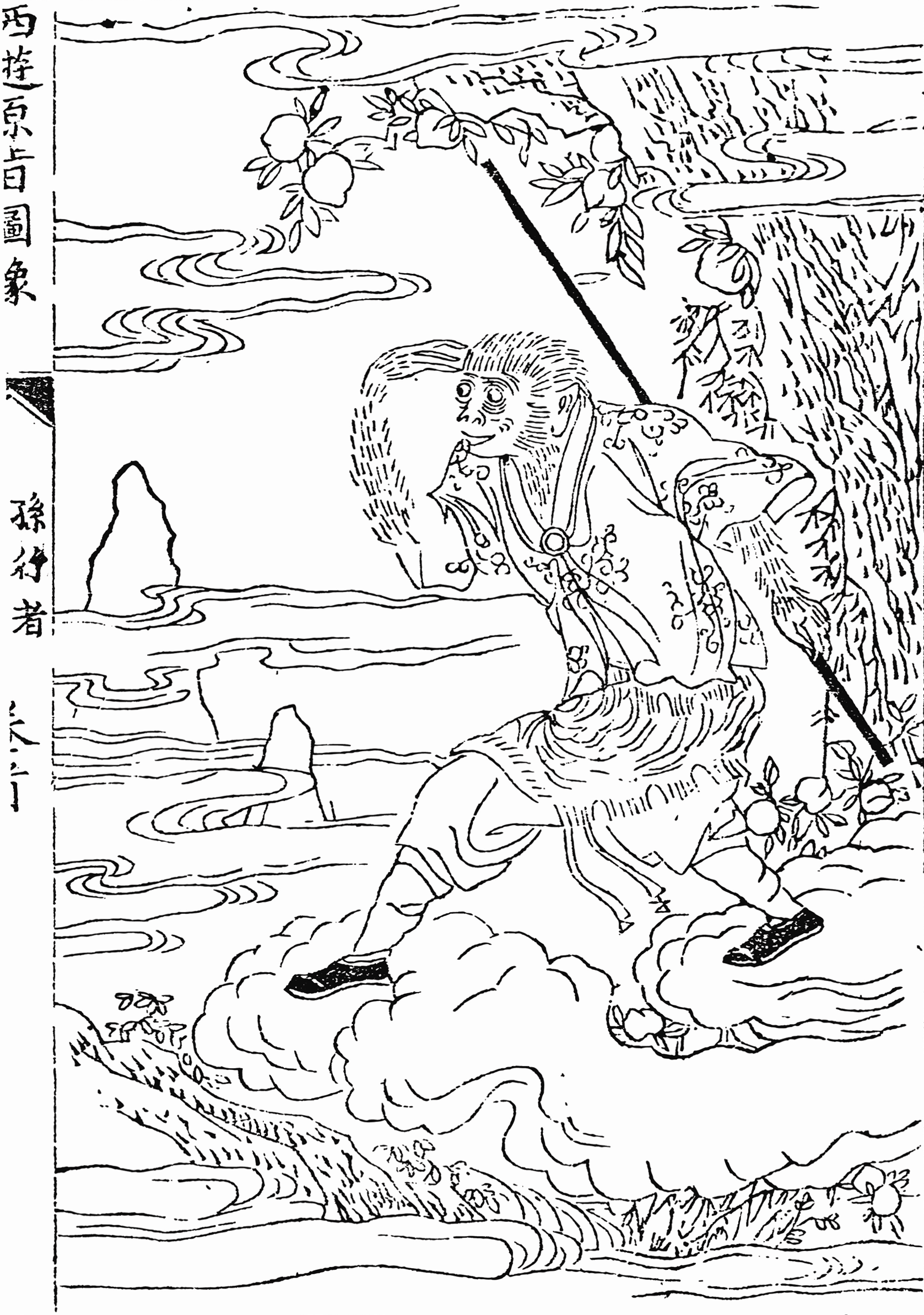
Sun Wukong in Xiyou yuanzhi (西遊原旨), published 1819

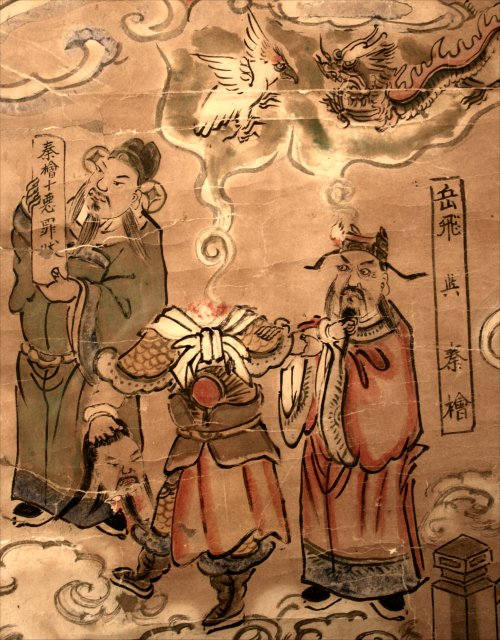
The headless ghost of Yue Fei confronting the recently deceased spirit of Qin Hui in hell. From a 19th-century Chinese Hell Scroll.

The Supplement's episode of the torture of Qin Hui in hell has many elements that appeared in earlier fictional literature. The idea of someone serving as an adjunct king of hell was first mentioned in a collection of oral traditions called Popular tales of the Record of the Three Kingdoms (三國志評話), the literary ancestor of the Romance of the Three Kingdoms. This was one of five such compilations printed in the Newly Published, Fully Illustrated Pinghua (新刊全相評話) series during the reign of Yuan Emperor Yingzhong (1321-1323). It was later popularized in Feng Menglong's Stories Old and New (古今小說, 1620), a collection of original works and earlier oral traditions. The tale entitled "Sima Mao Disrupts Order in the Underworld and Sits in Judgment" is about a poor Han dynasty scholar named Sima Mao who is constantly passed over for promotion to various government posts in favor of wealthy men who underhandedly pay for their positions. Sima writes a poem criticizing the celestial hierarchy and claims he could do a better job at righting wrongs than the king of hell. The Jade Emperor of heaven initially wishes to punish Sima for his blasphemy, but the embodiment of the Planet Venus talks him into letting the scholar act as the King of Hell for twelve hours to test his worth. Sima is given Yama's throne under the stipulation that he will enjoy success in his next life if he solves hell's most difficult cold cases, but will be damned never to be reborn into the human realm if he fails. He tries four cases involving famous Han dynasty personages—Han Xin, Peng Yue, Liu Bang, etc.—and passes sagely verdicts. For his great deed, Sima and his wife are born into wealth in their next lives.

Portions of the story dealing with Yue Fei's retribution originally appeared in several storytelling compilations, including the fifteenth-century work An Imitative Collection of Stories (小品集), and in an early folklore biography on the general named Restoration of the Great Song Dynasty: The Story of King Yue (大宋中興岳王傳, c. 1552). Feng Menlong later used such oral tales when he adapted the aforementioned story about Sima Mao to write "Humu Di Intones Poems and Visits the Netherworld," which was included in his collection. It is about a poor Yuan dynasty scholar named Humu Di (胡母迪) who fails to gain a government post because he cannot pass the imperial exams. After a bout of drinking, Humu writes a series of poems criticizing heaven for not punishing the wicked and states he would torture Qin Hui for the murder of Yue Fei if he was the king of hell. (Note: This particular tale claims Yue Fei to be a reincarnation of the famous Han General Zhang Fei. Yue Fei's popular folklore biography The Story of Yue Fei (1684), on the other hand, states Yue to be the celestial bird Garuda reborn on earth.) For his irreverent remarks, Humu's soul is dragged to the Chinese underworld of Diyu. There, King Yama orders an underworld official to take Humu on a tour of the various tortures of hell in order to witness firsthand the result of karmic retribution. The two first come to Qin Hui's personal hell where his punishments are similar to those mentioned in the Supplement. His destroyed body is blown back into its proper form by a "sinister whirling wind" after each punishment has been metered. The official explains after three years of continuous torture, Qin will be reborn on earth as all manner of animals, including pigs, to be slaughtered and eaten until the end of time. The two then view the tortures of other wicked people before returning to Yama's palace. After having tea with the souls of righteous men waiting on their rebirths, Yama sends Humu back to the world of the living satisfied that the heavenly hierarchy is doing its job. Humu becomes an official in hell upon his death years later.

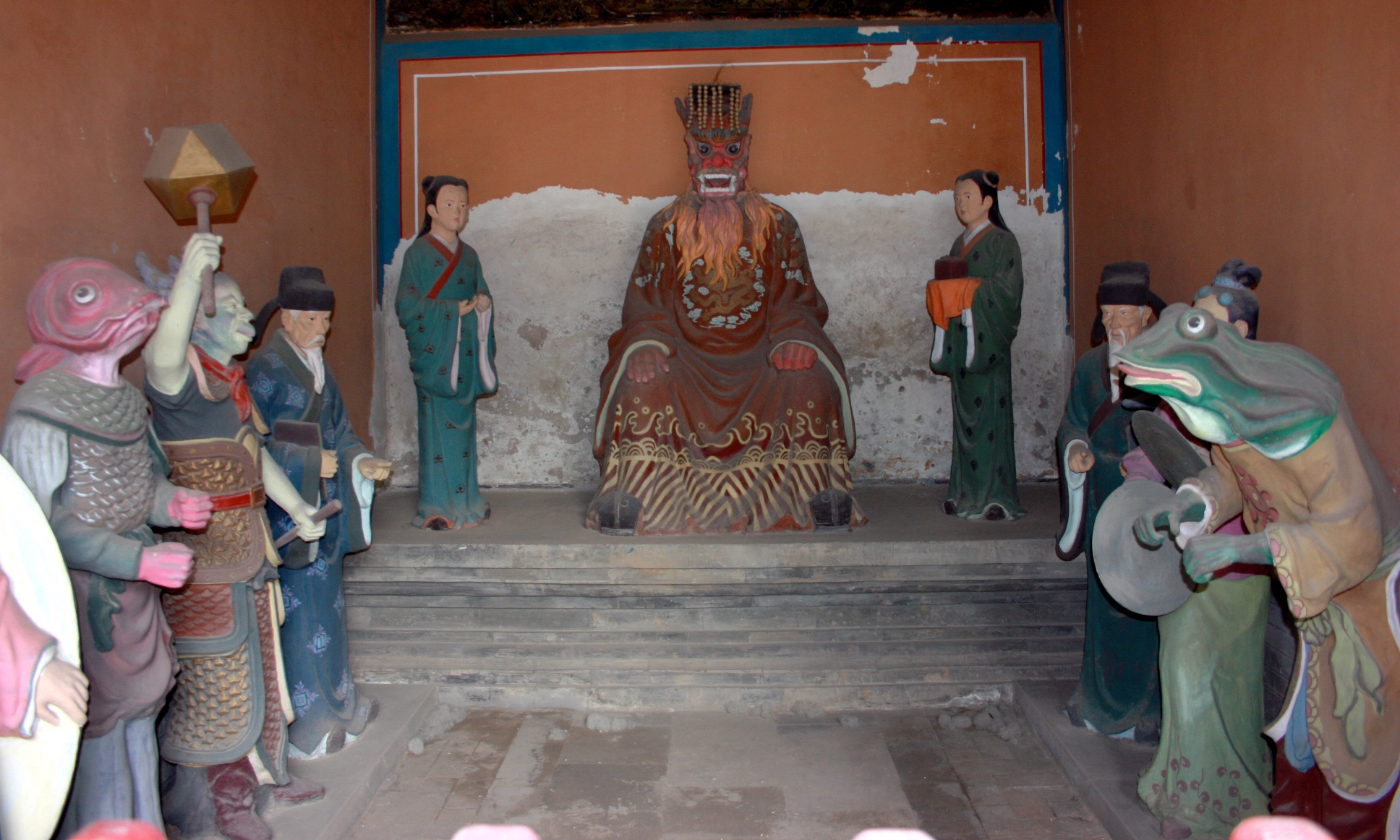
Eastern Peak Temple statues representing the "Department of rain gods".

A modified version of the former tale appears in Yue Fei's later folklore biography The Story of Yue Fei (1684). This story is about a rich, drunken Song dynasty scholar named Hu Di (胡迪) who writes a blasphemous poem and is himself dragged to hell for his remarks about King Yama. He is taken on a tour and attends the punishment of the recently deceased Qin Hui, which includes the same tortures and endless karmic rebirths as animals. Qin's damaged body is, again, put back into its proper form by a magical wind. Hu returns to Yama's palace convinced that he was too quick to judge the ways of heaven and hell. Yama allows Hu to write out formal charges against Qin and his family. Meanwhile, in a manner similar to the Supplement, the soul of Yue Fei is brought to hell. He learns the reason he suffered an untimely death is because he went against the ways of heaven in his former life. (Note: This differs from Yama's opinion given in Feng's work. He claims Yue Fei died unjustly for no certain reason.) Qin Hui is then brought before Yue to be summarily beaten with iron rods for the charges brought against him. After seeing the general off from Hell, King Yama orders a demon to quickly return Hu's soul to the world of the living in order to avoid his earthly body from decomposing. He lives a life of charity and dies in his 90s.

The story of Qin's torture in hell is so well known that the Daoist Eastern Peak Temple, which is famous for its statuary representations of the celestial hierarchy, has a small hall dedicated to Yue Fei in which a likeness of the former Prime Minister is being led off to the underworld by a demon. It is also important to note that Yue Fei's headless ghost is a prominent fixture in religious Chinese Hell Scrolls.

== Translations ==
The novel have been translated into English under the titles The Tower of Myriad Mirrors (full The Tower of Myriad Mirrors: A Supplement to Journey to the West) (1978) and Further Adventures on the Journey to the West (2020).

== Modern critical reception in the West ==
A Supplement to the Journey to the West has been described by Rania Huntington as "One of the strangest and most fascinating novels the Chinese tradition ever produced. The interweaving of humor and profundity in Further Adventures on the Journey to the West is both homage to its beloved parent novel and utterly unique." Maram Epstein described the novel as "A jewel of late imperial literati fiction and mind-bending Chan Buddhist wit." Wilt L. Idema says it is "A unique blend of brilliant acuity, unbridled fantasy, and serious reflection that is a continuous pleasure to read." According to David Rolston, the novel was "centuries ahead of its time both in China and the West, employing a form of stream-of-consciousness writing unprecedented in either hemisphere."

== See also ==
- Hou Xiyouji (Later Journey to the West)
