= Hou Xiyouji =

The opening of Chapter 1 of Hou Xiyouji

Hou Xiyouji (simplified Chinese: 后西游记; traditional Chinese: 後西遊記), also spelled as Hou Xiyou ji, and translated into English as Later Journey to the West, is a 17th-century Chinese novel written by an author who is credited in the preface as "Tianhua Talent Scholar." A number of researchers identifies this pseudonymous author to be Mei Zhihe (梅子和). A shenmo novel, it was published during the late Ming-early Qing transition period of the mid 17th-century or just before the Kangxi era. It is a sequel to the celebrated 16th-century novel Journey to the West (Xiyouji) by Wu Cheng'en, and it is considered to be one of its three most popular sequels, along with Xiyoubu (A Supplement to the Journey to the West) and Xu Xiyouji (A Continuation of the Journey to the West). Of the three most famous sequels, Hou Xiyouji is considered to be very similar to the parent novel in terms of its humor and structure, although the setting in Hou Xiyouji takes place 200 years after the original, with new group of main characters. The novel consist of 40 chapters.

Cover of an early 20th century copy of the novel

Pages from a 19th-century Japanese translation of the Hou Xiyouji

Pages from a published edition from the Qianlong era
