= Ruyi Jingu Bang =

Magical staff of Sun Wukong

Chinese name
- Chinese: 如意金箍棒
- Literal meaning: As desired, golden-hooped staff
Transcriptions
Standard Mandarin
- Hanyu Pinyin: rúyì jīngū bàng

Japanese name
- Kanji: 如意棒
- Hiragana: にょい ぼー
Transcriptions
- Romanization: nyoi bō

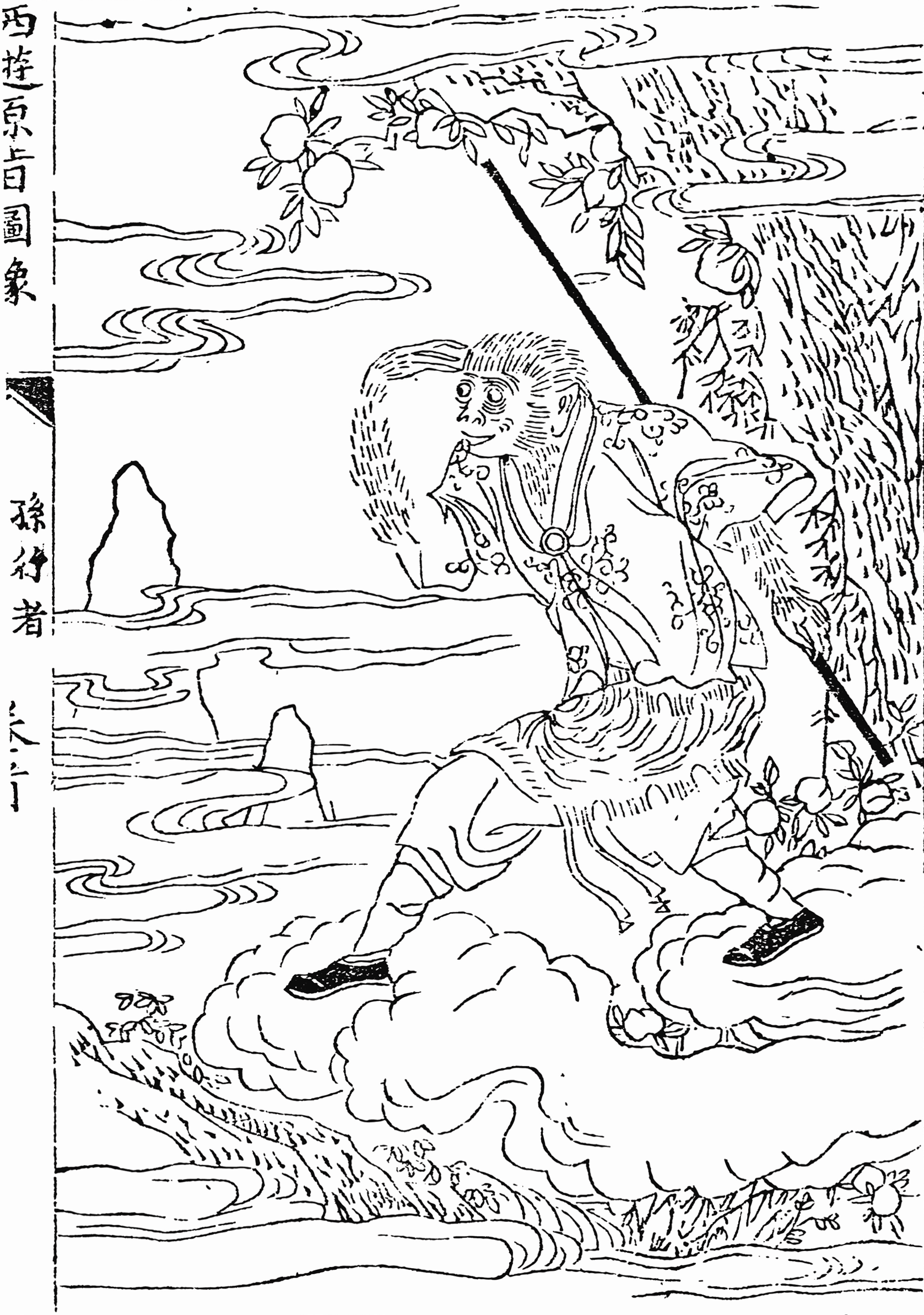
A 19th-century drawing of Sun Wukong featuring his staff.

Ruyi Jingu Bang (Chinese: 如意金箍棒; pinyin: Rúyì Jīngū Bàng; Wade–Giles: Ju^{2}-yi^{4} Chin^{1}-ku^{1}-pang^{4}), or simply Ruyi Bang or Jingu Bang, is the poetic name of a magical staff wielded by the immortal monkey Sun Wukong in the 16th-century classic Chinese novel Journey to the West.

Anthony Yu translated the name simply as "The Compliant Golden-Hooped Rod", while W.J.F. Jenner translates it as the "As-You-Will Gold-Banded Cudgel."

== Origin and general description ==
The staff first appears in the third chapter when the Monkey King goes to the underwater kingdom of Ao Guang (Chinese: 敖廣), the Dragon King of the East Sea, looking for a magic weapon to match his strength and skill. When all of the traditional magic weapons—swords, spears, and halberds weighing thousands of pounds each—fail to meet his standards, the dragon queen suggests to her husband that they give Sun a useless iron pillar taking up space in their treasury. She claims that the ancient shaft had started producing heavenly light days prior and suggests that the monkey is fated to own it. The novel never explains how the pillar was made, only that it was originally used by Yu the Great to measure the depths of the world flood during times immemorial.

The staff is initially described as a pillar of black iron twenty feet in height and the width of a barrel. It is only when Monkey lifts it and suggests that a smaller size would be more manageable that the staff complies with his wishes and shrinks. After this, it is only a little taller than him, and as thick as a rice bowl. This is when Sun sees that the weapon is banded with a gold ring on each end, as well as the inscription along the body reading "The Compliant Golden-Hooped Rod. Weight: thirteen thousand five hundred catties" (如意金箍棒重一萬三千五百斤). The inscription indicates that the staff follows the commands of its owner, shrinking or growing to his whim, make copies of itself, and that it is immensely heavy, weighing 17,550 lbs (7,960 kg).

When not in use, Monkey shrinks it down to the size of a needle and keeps it tucked inside his ear.

== Literary predecessor ==
The oldest edition of Journey to the West, the 13th-century Kōzanji Version (高山寺) published during the late Song dynasty, diverges in many points from the final version published during the Ming. For instance, the episode where Monkey acquires the staff is completely different, as is the staff itself. Sun takes the monk Tang Sanzang to heaven to meet the supreme god Mahabrahma Deva. After the monk impresses the gods with his lecture on the Lotus Sutra, Monkey is given a golden monk's staff (among other items) as a magical weapon against the evils they will face on their journey to India. Sun later uses the staff in a battle with a white-clad woman who transforms into a tiger demon. He changes the staff into a titanic red-haired, blue-skinned Yaksha with a club, showing that the predecessor of the Compliant Golden-Hooped Rod has more magical abilities.

A weapon that predates the Compliant Rod from the Ming version is mentioned in passing early on in the tale. Monkey mentions that the Queen Mother of the West had flogged him with an "Iron Cudgel" (鐵棒) on his left and right sides for stealing 10 peaches from her heavenly garden. He later borrows the cudgel to use in tandem with the monk's staff to battle 9 dragons. The rings on the latter may have influenced the bands on the former.

== In popular culture ==
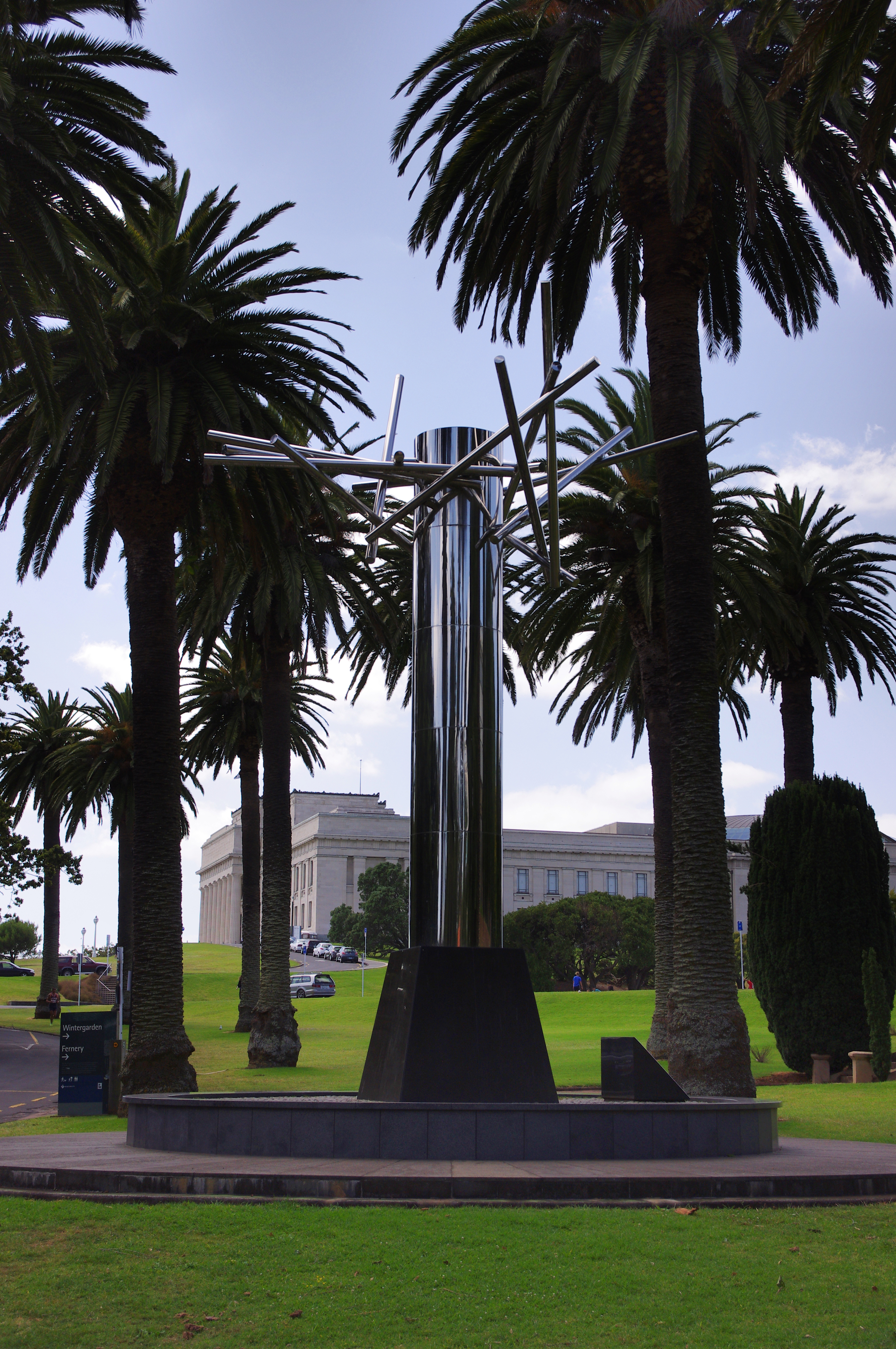
Guy Ngan's sculpture "Millennium Tree" (2005) in the Auckland Domain was inspired by Ruyi Jingu Bang

- The staff influenced the weapon used by Son Goku (himself based on Sun Wukong), the main character of the Dragon Ball franchise. It is named "Nyoi Bō", the Japanese transliteration of Ruyi Bang (Chinese: 如意棒; lit. 'Compliant Rod'), and is commonly called "Power Pole" in English-language media. Like its original counterpart, the Nyoi Bo can grow to tall lengths, which Goku uses to his advantage for mobility and combat. However, he cannot duplicate it. The staff is given to him as a child by his adoptive grandfather, Son Gohan, a human who takes him in and teaches him martial arts. Its true purpose is to use its size-changing ability to travel from Korin Tower to the Lookout.
- In Naruto, the Ruyi Jingu Bang was also the inspiration for the specialized transformation (Henge) of Monkey-King Enma, the personal summons of the 3rd (Sandaime) Hokage, Lord Hiruzen Sarutobi, into the "Kongō Nyoi" (Adament Nyoi).
- In the Korean webtoon and anime The God of High School, the protagonist Jin Mo-Ri, who is Sun Wukong, wields Ruyi Jingu Bang.
- In the video game Warframe, one of the playable characters (warframes) is named Wukong and summons an extremely powerful staff as his ultimate ability. During usage, the staff varies in length and thickness. Wukong can also duplicate himself and use cloud form to travel faster (in reference to jindou yun, 筋斗雲).
- The sculpture "Millennium Tree" (2005) by Chinese-New Zealand artist Guy Ngan located in the Auckland Domain in New Zealand was inspired by Ruyi Jingu Bang.
- Taobao has a dispute resolution mechanism through which sellers can remove a limited number of malicious reviews per day which is named after the staff.

== See also ==
- Ruyi (scepter)
