= Alison Waley =

New Zealand poet and writer (1901–2001)

- Born: 29 April 1901; Nelson, New Zealand
- Died: 10 May 2001 (aged 100); Highgate, London, United Kingdom
- Occupations: Poet, journalist, artist, writer
- Notable work: A Half of Two Lives: A Personal Memoir

Alison Grant Robinson Waley (29 April 1901 – 10 May 2001) was a New Zealand poet, journalist, artist and writer, best known for her memoir A Half of Two Lives: A Personal Memoir, a book about her lifelong affair with writer and translator Arthur Waley.

== Biography ==
Waley was born in Nelson, New Zealand on 29 April 1901. In late 1920, she began writing children's page called the "Fairy Ring" which come out every Saturday in The Evening Post published in Wellington, New Zealand. She wrote under the name Fairiel and was producing most of the writing and drawing for the page. Waley was also a well known poet and associate of Robin Hyde. Some of her poetry was published in 1930 in an anthology of New Zealand poetry titled Kowhai Gold.

In 1929, she traveled to London, sold her return ticket to New Zealand, and then began working in publishing. That same year, she met Arthur Waley. They remained lovers for the rest of Arthur's life. Her relationship with him is the subject of her memoir. Waley met Arthur at a literary restaurant called Antoine's located on Charlotte Street. Waley was on an Antipodian Grand Tour. After meeting at the restaurant, she and Arthur talked and she "became emamoured before she realised that he was her hero, Arthur Waley, whose translations were the only book she had brought with her." At the time, Arthur's patron and possible lover, Beryl de Zoete, asked him to leave Waley. Waley went on to marry Hugh Ferguson Robinson and had a son, John. She stayed married to Robinson for 15 years.

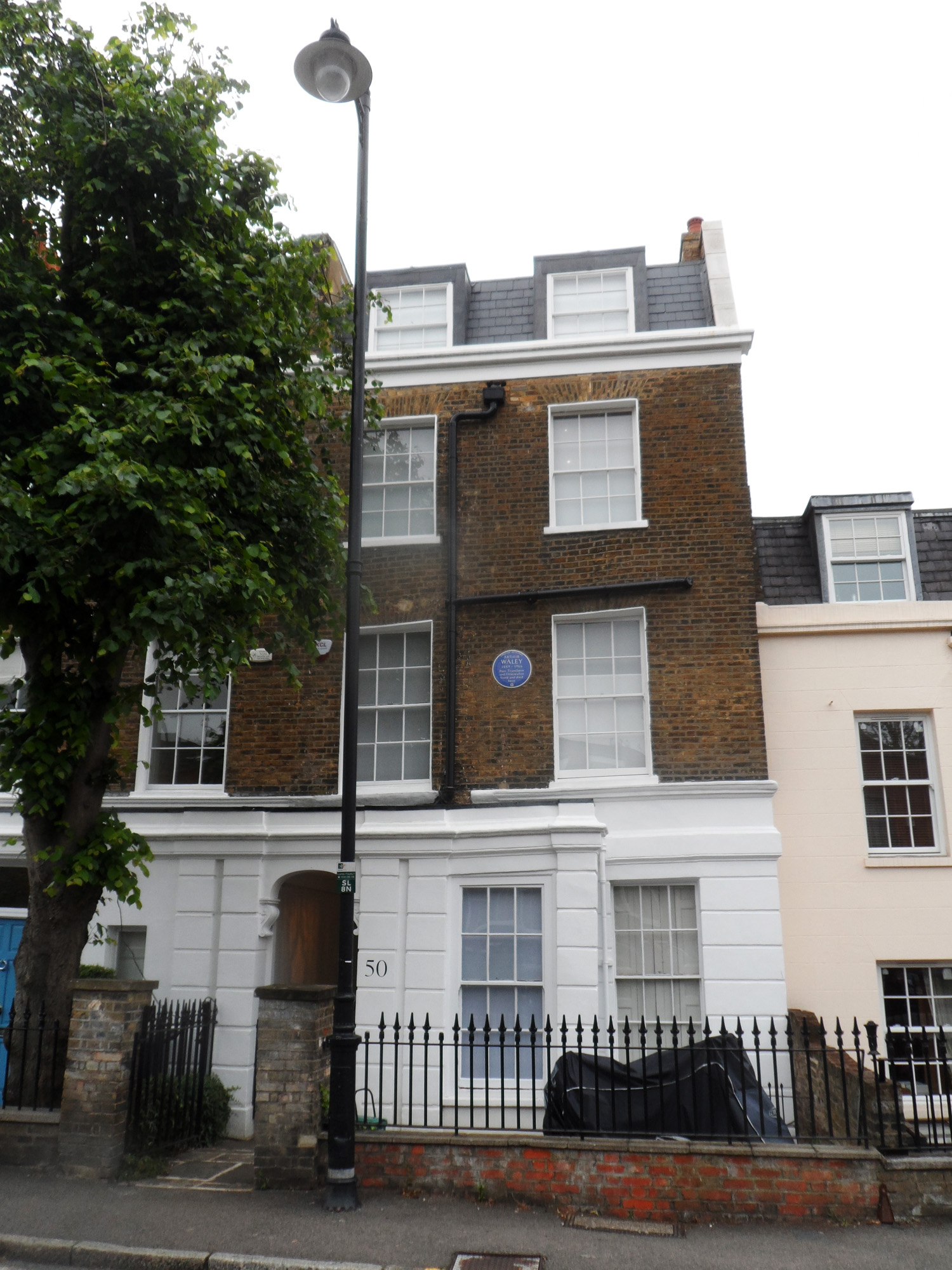
Arthur and Alison home at 50 Southwood Lane in Highgate, London

Waley and her family moved London, where she worked for a publisher. She started writing poetry and also worked on her memoir. She and Arthur met again during World War II. During this time, she and Arthur would meet, despite de Zoete trying to keep them apart. De Zoete even intercepted letters between the couple. After de Zoete died in 1962, Arthur felt able to devote himself to Waley. A month before Arthur died in 1966, he and Waley married. Alison and he had been living together in his home at Highgate, but only his closest friends knew about their love affair. Alison Wiley continued to live at Highgate until her death on 21 May 2001.

== Publications ==
The accuracy of various accounts in her memoir, A Half of Two Lives, published in 1983, are disputed. In his review of the book in The New York Times, Humphrey Carpenter describes Waley's recollection of when she and Arthur first met as "one of many scarcely credible incidents in this strange book." Nonetheless, through this book, she follows her relationship with Arthur, her marriage to another man, his marriage to another woman, and the feelings of love and longing. In the last months of his life, after his wife had died, Alison and Arthur wed. In spite of the various unsubstantiated parts of the book, Carpenter nonetheless declared the book to be a "kind of mad, splendid poem in itself," attributing certain distortions of reality in the book to the confusing, maddening treatment Alison endured throughout the relationship.

Waley also adapted Chinese folktales, such as Dear Monkey, which was published in 1973. School Library Journal called it a "fine addition to Chinese folklore collections."

== Selected works ==
- Dear Monkey, 1973
- A Half of Two Lives, 1983
