= Literati =

Literati may refer to:

- Intellectuals or those who love, read, and comment on literature
- Intelligentsia, a status class of highly educated people who consciously shape society
- The scholar-official or literati of imperial/medieval China
  - Qing literati
  - Literati painting, also known as the southern school of painting, developed by Chinese literati
  - The literati style of bonsai, consisting of thin, elegant trees in the calligraphic style of literati painting
  - Confucianism, known as the school of literati
- Bunjinga (文人画, "literati painting"), a Japanese painting style from the late Edo period inspired from medieval Chinese literati painting;
- The game Literati, a variant of Scrabble developed by Yahoo! Games
- Literati (book club), children's book club
