= Anthony C. Yu =

Chinese-American sinologist and theologian

- Born: August 6, 1938; Hong Kong
- Died: May 12, 2015 (aged 76); Chicago, Illinois, U.S.
- Occupations: Literary theorist, sinologist, theologian
- Board member of: Modern Language Association
- Spouse: Priscilla Yu
- Children: 1

Academic background
- Education: University of Chicago (PhD); Fuller Theological Seminary (S.T.B); Houghton College

Academic work
- Discipline: Literature, religion, sinology
- Sub-discipline: Comparative Literature, East Asian Languages and Civilizations
- Institutions: University of Chicago
- Notable works: Translation of Journey to the West

Anthony C. Yu
- Traditional Chinese: 余國藩
- Simplified Chinese: 余国藩
Transcriptions
Standard Mandarin
- Hanyu Pinyin: Yú Guófān
Yue: Cantonese
- Yale Romanization: Yùh Gwok-fàahn
- Jyutping: Jyu4 Gwok Faan4

Anthony Christopher Yu (Chinese: 余國藩; pinyin: Yú Guófān; October 6, 1938 – May 12, 2015) was an American literary theorist, sinologist, and theologian. He was a scholar of literature and religion, both East Asian and Western; and was the Carl Darling Buck Distinguished Service Professor Emeritus in the Humanities and Professor Emeritus of Religion and Literature in the Chicago Divinity School; as well as a member of the Departments of Comparative Literature, East Asian Languages and Civilizations, and English Language and Literature, and the Committee on Social Thought at the University of Chicago. Yu has published widely in the fields of religion and comparative literature and is perhaps best known for his four-volume translation of one of China's Four Great Classical Novels Journey to the West into English.

== Biography ==
Yu was born in Hong Kong on October 6, 1938. His middle initial "C" was only a legal formality, though Yu later took the middle name Christopher. His father, Pak Chuen Yu, a general in the Chinese Nationalist Army, and his mother Norma Sau Chan, then went to the mainland to escape the Japanese invasion. There, starting at the age of four, Yu learned classical Chinese from his grandfather, who would tell him stories from Journey to the West and draw Chinese characters in the sand for him to learn. After the war he went with his parents to Taiwan. He went to the United States, where he graduated from Houghton College, then took a bachelor's degree in theology at Fuller Theological Seminary (S.T.B) and the University of Chicago (Ph.D.). Among his honors and awards are elected membership in the American Council of Learned Societies and Academia Sinica, as well as the Guggenheim Fellowship and Mellon Foundation grant.

He died of heart failure in 2015.

== Works ==
- Yu, Anthony C. (1969). The Fall: The Poetic and Theological Realism of Aeschylus, Milton, and Camus.
- —— (1973). Parnassus Revisited: Modern Critical Essays on the Epic Tradition. Chicago: American Library Association. ISBN 0838901328.
- —— (1997). Rereading the Stone: Desire and the Making of Fiction in Dream of the Red Chamber. Princeton, N.J.: Princeton University Press. ISBN 0691015619.
- —— (2005). State and Religion in China: Historical and Textual Perspectives. Chicago, Ill.: Open Court. ISBN 0812695526.
- --- coedited (with Mary Gerhart) Morphologies of Faith: Essays in Religion and Culture in Honor of Nathan A. Scott, Jr.
- —— (2008). Religion, Education and the Conflict of Culture. Hong Kong: Chung Chi College, Chinese University of Hong Kong. ISBN 9789628216208.
